= List of international prime ministerial trips made by Jacinda Ardern =

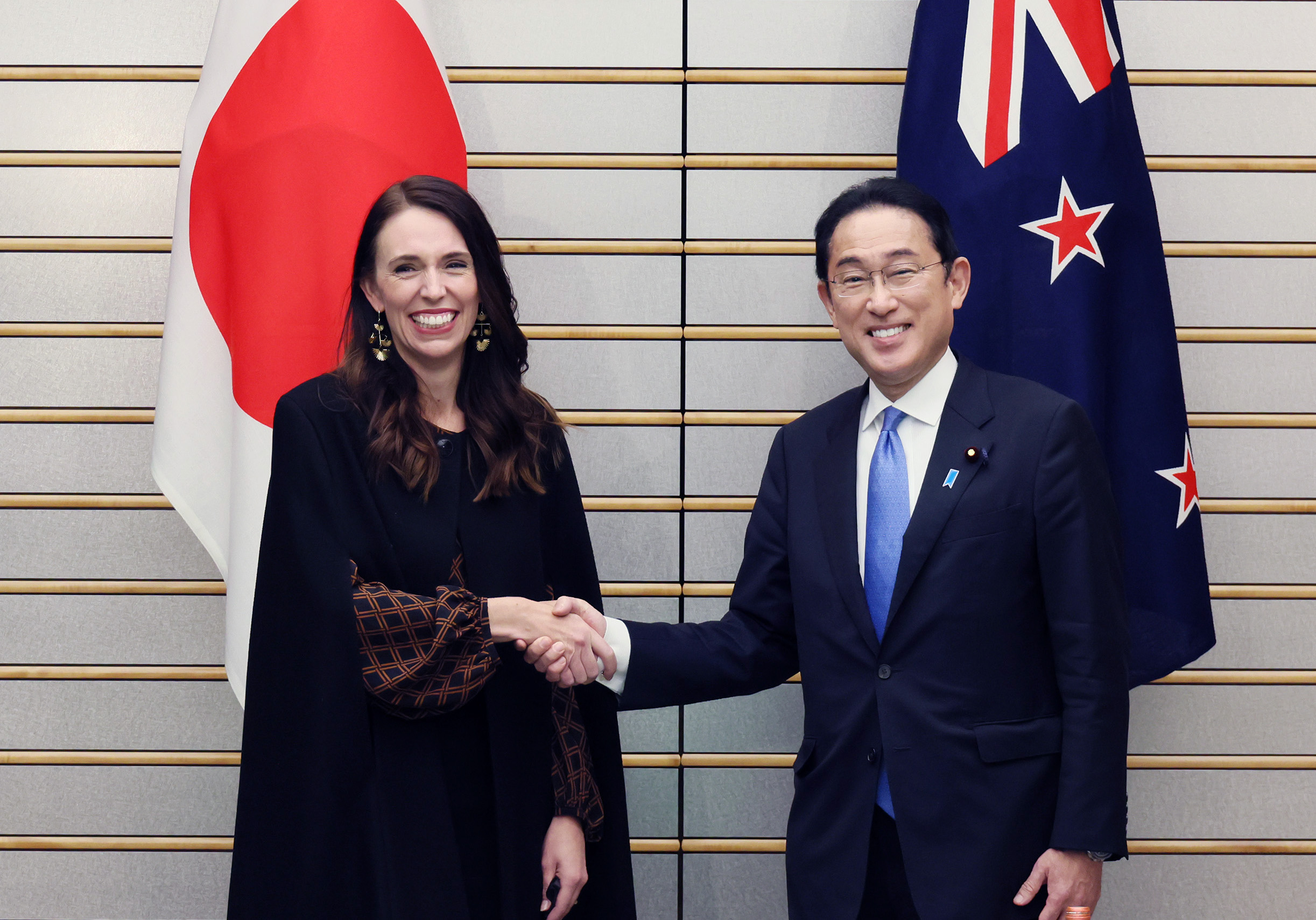
Jacinda Ardern met with Japanese prime minister Fumio Kishida in 2022.

Jacinda Ardern, who served as the 40th prime minister of New Zealand from 26 October 2017 until her resignation on 25 January 2023, travelled internationally to attend bilateral and multilateral diplomatic meetings and to lead trade delegations. During her premiership, Ardern made 27 international trips to 21 sovereign countries and to two associated states and one dependent territory of New Zealand.

Owing to the COVID-19 pandemic in New Zealand, Ardern did not travel internationally between early 2020 and 2022. Extensive travel in 2022 was undertaken to make up for this, and to promote the reopening of New Zealand to international visitors.

== Summary ==
=== States visited ===
1 visit 2 visits 3 visits 4 visits 5 visits New Zealand

Ardern made the following visits to overseas locations:

- One visit to Cambodia, Cook Islands, (Note: The Cook Islands and Niue are associated states of New Zealand.) China, Germany, Nauru, Niue, Philippines, Papua New Guinea, Ross Dependency, (Note: The Ross Dependency is claimed by New Zealand. However, this claim is subject to the Antarctic Treaty System and is not recognised by most other countries.) Spain, Switzerland, Tonga, Tokelau, (Note: Tokelau is a dependent territory of New Zealand.) and Tuvalu
- Two visits to Belgium, Fiji, France, Japan, Thailand, and Vietnam
- Three visits to Samoa and Singapore
- Four visits to United Kingdom and United States
- Seven visits to Australia

=== Multilateral meetings ===
Jacinda Ardern attended the following summits during her prime ministership:

Group	Year					
Group	2017	2018	2019	2020	2021	2022
UNGA		24–28 September, (United States) New York City	23–28 September, (United States) New York City	29 September, (videoconference) (United States) New York City	24 September, (videoconference) (United States) New York City	23 September, (United States) New York City
APEC	10–11 November, (Vietnam) Đà Nẵng	17–18 November, (Papua New Guinea) Port Moresby	16–17 November, (cancelled) (Chile) Santiago	20 November, (videoconference) (Malaysia) Kuala Lumpur	12 November, (videoconference) (New Zealand) Auckland	18–19 November, (Thailand) Bangkok
EAS (ASEAN)	13–14 November, (Philippines) Pasay	14–15 November, Singapore	4 November, (Thailand) Bangkok	14 November, (videoconference) (Vietnam) Hanoi	26–27 October, (videoconference) (Brunei) Bandar Seri Begawan	12–13 November, (Cambodia) Phnom Penh
CHOGM		18–20 April, (United Kingdom) London	None			20–26 June, (Rwanda) Kigali
PIF		5 September, (Nauru) Yaren	14–16 August, (Tuvalu) Funafuti	None	6 August, (videoconference) (Fiji) Suva	11–14 July, (Fiji) Suva
NATO						28–30 June, (Spain) Madrid
██ = Did not attend ██ = Was an Invited Guest

== 2017 ==
Country	Locations	Dates	Details
Australia	Sydney	5 November	Ardern held a bilateral meeting with Australian prime minister Malcolm Turnbull.
Vietnam	Hanoi; Ho Chi Minh City; Da Nang	9–11 November	Ardern attended the 2017 APEC Summit and met with Vietnamese president Trần Đại Quang and Prime Minister Nguyễn Xuân Phúc, Japanese prime minister Shinzō Abe and Malaysian prime minister Najib Razak.
Philippines	Manila; Pasay	12–14 November	Ardern attended the 31st ASEAN Summit and the Twelfth East Asia Summit and met with Filipino President Rodrigo Duterte, Canadian prime minister Justin Trudeau and Indian prime minister Narendra Modi.

== 2018 ==
Country	Locations	Dates	Details
Australia	Sydney	1–2 March	Ardern met Prime Minister Malcolm Turnbull to discuss Closer Economic Relations and spoke at the Australia–New Zealand Leadership Forum.
Samoa	Apia; Magiagi Tai	5–6 March	Ardern met Prime Minister Tuilaepa Aiono Sailele Malielegaoi and visited the National University of Samoa and Robert Louis Stevenson Museum.
Niue	Alofi	6 March	Ardern met her father and New Zealand high commissioner Ross Ardern and discussed economic and environmental sustainability with Prime Minister Toke Talagi.
Tonga	Nukuʻalofa	6–8 March	Ardern met with Prime Minister ʻAkilisi Pōhiva.
Cook Islands	Rarotonga	8 March	Ardern met with Prime Minister Henry Puna and discussed pension portability. Later that day changes were announced to make it easier for residents of the Realm of New Zealand to access New Zealand superannuation payments.
Australia	Gold Coast	13–14 April	Ardern met with Team New Zealand's medal winners and watched the women's hockey final at the Commonwealth Games.
France	Paris	16 April	Ardern held a bilateral meeting with French president Emmanuel Macron to discuss climate change, the 2018 bombing of Damascus and Homs and trade, after which Macron declared support for a European Union–New Zealand Free Trade Agreement. Ardern also discussed the CPTPP with Canadian prime minister Justin Trudeau and spoke about climate change at Sciences Po.
Germany	Berlin	17 April	Ardern met with German Chancellor Angela Merkel and discussed trade which included Merkel's support of a Free Trade Agreement between New Zealand and the European Union, Brexit, the ongoing tensions with Russia, the Syrian bombings, climate change and co-operation over science and space.
United Kingdom	London	17–21 April	Ardern met with Charles, Prince of Wales and Camilla, Duchess of Cornwall. Then met with British prime minister Theresa May where discussions about Russia dominated the meeting. Ardern also attended a Town Hall debate with Canadian prime minister Justin Trudeau, hosted by London mayor Sadiq Khan and a Five Eyes meeting with Prime Minister May, Trudeau and Turnbull to receive an intelligence briefing. The following day Ardern attended the Commonwealth Heads of Government Meeting 2018 and had an audience with Elizabeth II.
Nauru	Yaren	5 September	Ardern attended the Pacific Islands Forum.
United States	New York City	24–28 September	Ardern delivered a keynote speech at the Social Good Summit, met with UNICEF Executive Director Henrietta Fore and United Nations Secretary-General António Guterres. She then made a keynote speech at the opening of Climate Week, made a statement at the Nelson Mandela Peace Summit Opening Plenary, held bilateral meetings with Colombian president Iván Duque Márquez, Irish prime minister Leo Varadkar, Austrian chancellor Sebastian Kurz and Spanish prime minister Pedro Sánchez and attended US president Donald Trump's reception for heads of delegation. Thereafter Ardern spoke at the Global Planet Summit, the Bloomberg Global Business Forum and held a trilateral meeting with Canadian prime minister Justin Trudeau and Chilean president Sebastián Piñera; that evening, she appeared on The Late Show with Stephen Colbert. The following day Ardern spoke at a meeting on the Prevention and Control of Non-Communicable Diseases, made a speech at the International Conference on Sustainable Development, attended the inaugural meeting of the Carbon Neutrality Coalition and delivered New Zealand's national statement at the Seventy-third session of the United Nations General Assembly.
Singapore	Singapore	13–17 November	Ardern attended the 33rd ASEAN Summit and the Thirteenth East Asia Summit and held bilateral meetings with Burmese state counsellor Aung San Suu Kyi, Australian prime minister Scott Morrison, Chinese premier Li Keqiang, Singaporean prime minister Lee Hsien Loong, Japanese prime minister Shinzō Abe and Malaysian prime minister Mahathir Mohamad.
Papua New Guinea	Port Moresby	17–19 November	Ardern attended the 2018 APEC Summit.

== 2019 ==
Country	Locations	Dates	Details
United Kingdom	London	20–21 January	Ardern held a bilateral meeting with British prime minister Theresa May to discuss post Brexit trade.
Switzerland	Davos	22–23 January	Ardern attended the 49th Annual Meeting of the World Economic Forum and held bilateral meetings with Luxembourg prime minister Xavier Bettel, Peruvian vice president Mercedes Aráoz and Estonian prime minister Jüri Ratas. She discussed inequality with Oxfam executive director Winnie Byanyima and additionally took part in a number of panel discussions, one on climate change with Sir David Attenborough and Al Gore, a panel focused on mental health with Prince William. Another focused on wellbeing and options beyond GDP with the head of the Organisation for Economic Cooperation and Development and the future of the international trading system with the head of the World Trade Organization.
Belgium	Brussels	24–25 January	Ardern met with the president of the European Commission Jean Claude Juncker, President of the European Council Donald Tusk and NATO Secretary General Jens Stoltenberg to further discussions of a free trade agreement. She also held a bilateral meeting with Dutch prime minister Mark Rutte.
China	Beijing	1 April	Ardern met with Chinese president Xi Jinping and Premier Li Keqiang and opened the new Embassy of New Zealand building.
France	Paris	14–16 May	Ardern and French president Emmanuel Macron co-chaired the Christchurch Call summit to see world leaders and CEOs of tech companies agree to a pledge to eliminate terrorist and violent extremist content online in the wake of the 15 March Christchurch mosque shootings.
Singapore	Singapore	17 May	Ardern held bilateral meetings with Singaporean prime minister Lee Hsien Loong and President Halimah Yacob and launched the New Zealand-Singapore Enhanced Partnership.
Australia	Melbourne	18–19 July	Ardern held a bilateral meeting with Prime Minister Scott Morrison and delivered a keynote speech at an event for the Australia and New Zealand School of Government.
Samoa	Apia	27–28 July	Ardern met with Prime Minister Tuilaepa Aiono Sailele Malielegaoi, visited the New Zealand funded Waterfront Events Space and Clocktower Boulevard and launched a national strategy document at the New Zealand High Commission.
Tokelau	Atafu; Fakaofo; Nukunonu	29–31 July	Ardern became the first New Zealand prime minister to visit in over 15 years. She talked with community leaders and members about climate change, healthcare and education, as well as preserving their cultural identity and language as part of the government's Pacific re-set strategy.
Tuvalu	Funafuti	14–16 August	Ardern attended the Pacific Islands Forum and announced $150 million for climate change resilience in the region.
Japan	Tokyo	18–22 September	Ardern held a bilateral meeting with Japanese prime minister Shinzō Abe and promoted trade, economic and tourism opportunities.
United States	New York City	23–28 September	Ardern gave the keynote speech at the UN Secretary General's Climate Action Summit, had bilateral meetings with US president Donald Trump, British prime minister Boris Johnson and King Abdullah II of Jordan, and followed up on the progress made by countries, technology companies and civil society on the Christchurch Call. She then delivered New Zealand's national statement at the Seventy-fourth session of the United Nations General Assembly and met with Pakistani prime minister Imran Khan. The following day, Ardern spoke at the Bloomberg Global Business Forum and a Goalkeepers (Gates Foundation) event and held bilateral meetings with Belgian prime minister Charles Michel, Spanish prime minister Pedro Sánchez, Icelandic prime minister Katrín Jakobsdóttir and Indian prime minister Narendra Modi.
Thailand	Bangkok	3–4 November	Ardern attended the 2019 ASEAN Summit and the Fourteenth East Asia Summit.

== 2020 ==
Country	Locations	Dates	Details
Fiji	Suva; Nadi; Lautoka	24–27 February	Ardern met with Fijian prime minister Frank Bainimarama, addressed students at the University of the South Pacific and met Fijian women leaders in government, business and civil society. She also paid respects to the three Fijian nationals killed in the Christchurch terror attacks.
Australia	Sydney	27–28 February	Ardern attended the annual Australia-New Zealand Leaders’ Meeting with Australian prime minister Scott Morrison and met with Australian Governor-General David Hurley and the New South Wales Premier Gladys Berejiklian.

== 2021 ==
There were no trips in 2021 due to the COVID-19 pandemic.

== 2022 ==
Country	Location	Date	Details
Singapore	Singapore	18–20 April	Ardern held bilateral meetings with Singaporean prime minister Lee Hsien Loong and President Halimah Yacob and led a trade delegation.
Japan	Tokyo	21–22 April	Ardern held a bilateral meeting with Japanese prime minister Fumio Kishida to discuss global and regional challenges. She also addressed the Japan-New Zealand Business Council and met with high-profile business and industry leaders, including the clean energy, tech, tourism and education sectors.
United States	New York City; Washington, D.C.; Cambridge; San Francisco; Seattle	23 May – 2 June	Ardern travelled to New York to appear on The Late Show with Stephen Colbert and met UN Secretary-General António Guterres. She then went to DC to meet with US senators. Her visit coincided with the Robb Elementary School shooting, and she spoke out about gun control. She gave the commencement address at Harvard University and was also awarded an honorary doctoral degree. She travelled to San Francisco to meet California governor Gavin Newsom, with whom she discussed climate change and green technology. She also met with various tech company executives in Seattle. Ardern attended meetings at the White House with President Joe Biden and Vice President Kamala Harris on 31 May.
Australia	Sydney	9–10 June	Ardern met with newly elected Prime Minister Anthony Albanese.
Spain	Madrid	28–30 June	Ardern attended the 32nd NATO Summit. During her time in Madrid she also held bilateral meetings with Spanish prime minister Pedro Sánchez, French president Emmanuel Macron, German Chancellor Olaf Scholz, Italian prime minister Mario Draghi and Dutch prime minister Mark Rutte, and attended a formal dinner held by Felipe VI King of Spain.
Belgium	Brussels	1 July	Ardern met with European Commission President Ursula von der Leyen, where they signed a trade agreement between New Zealand and the European Union.
United Kingdom	London	2–3 July	Ardern met with British prime minister Boris Johnson and gave a foreign policy speech at Chatham House. She also met with British high commissioner to New Zealand Laura Clarke and Prince William, the Duke of Cambridge.
Australia	Melbourne; Sydney	4–8 July	Ardern led a trade mission and re-met Australian prime minister Anthony Albanese as part of the Australia-New Zealand Leadership Forum. She also had meetings with Victorian premier Daniel Andrews and New South Wales Premier Dominic Perrottet.
Fiji	Suva	11–14 July	Ardern attended the 51st Pacific Islands Forum.
Samoa	Apia	1–2 August	Ardern commemorated the 60th Anniversary of the signing of the Treaty of Friendship, between New Zealand and Samoa.
United Kingdom	London	16–19 September	Ardern met with new monarch King Charles III and newly appointed British prime minister Liz Truss. Ardern also attended the state funeral of Elizabeth II.
United States	New York City	20–24 September	Ardern co-hosted the Christchurch Call to Action Leader's Summit with French president Emmanuel Macron. Ardern also delivered New Zealand's national statement at the Seventy-seventh session of the United Nations General Assembly.
Ross Dependency	Scott Base	26–28 October	Ardern visited Antarctica to see research undertaken by New Zealanders and mark the 65th year of Scott Base.
Cambodia	Phnom Penh	12–13 November	Ardern attended the 2022 ASEAN Summit and the Seventeenth East Asia Summit. She also had a bilateral meeting with Cambodian prime minister Hun Sen.
Vietnam	Hanoi; Ho Chi Minh City	14—17 November	Ardern led a trade mission and held bilateral meetings with Vietnamese prime minister Phạm Minh Chính and President Nguyễn Xuân Phúc. Following meetings, Ardern and Chính signed two agreements on aviation cooperation and working holiday visas.
Thailand	Bangkok	18–19 November	Ardern attended the 2022 APEC Summit and held bilateral meetings with Chinese president Xi Jinping, Canadian prime minister Justin Trudeau, South Korean prime minister Han Duck-soo, Indonesian president Joko Widodo and Filipino president Bongbong Marcos.

== See also ==
- Foreign relations of New Zealand
- List of international prime ministerial trips made by Bill English, her predecessor
- List of international prime ministerial trips made by Chris Hipkins, her successor
- List of international trips made by Winston Peters as Minister of Foreign Affairs of New Zealand
