= CNCA =

CNCA may refer to:

- Caisse Nationale de Crédit Agricole, a French banking network
- Carbon Neutral Cities Alliance
- Certification and Accreditation Administration, part of the Standardization Administration of China
- National Anti-Terrorism Coordination Center, now part of the Intelligence Center for Counter-Terrorism and Organized Crime, Spain
- National Council of Culture and the Arts, Chile
