= Carbon neutrality in India =

India Net Zero Plan

Carbon neutrality in India refers to reducing India's greenhouse gas emissions to the point where carbon emissions are neutral compared to the absorption of carbon dioxide, and often called "net zero". Like the European Union, United States and countries worldwide, India has implemented carbon neutrality measures and law reform at both federal and state levels:

- India has set a goal of reducing carbon emissions by 50% by 2030 and for the entire economy to be net zero by 2070.
- The Energy Conservation (Amendment) Act 2022, which empowers the central government to specify a carbon credit trading scheme.
- The Nationally Determined Contributions (NDCs), which set out India's emissions reduction targets for 2030.
- The Long-Term Low-Carbon Development Strategy (LTLEDS), which outlines India's long-term vision for decarbonisation.
- The Sustainable Energy Policy, which sets out the government's policies to promote renewable energy and energy efficiency.
- The National Electric Mobility Mission Plan, which aims to promote electric vehicles in India.

== See also ==
- Renewable energy in India
- Wind power in India
- Solar power in India
