= Net-zero emissions =

Rate of human-caused greenhouse gas emissions

Different climate targets and the corresponding date to reach net zero CO_{2} emissions

Global net-zero emissions are reached when greenhouse gas emissions and removals due to human activities are in balance. Net-zero emissions is often shortened to net zero. Once global net zero is achieved, further global warming is expected to significantly slow down, but the effects of existing atmospheric greenhouse gases will still contribute to continued warming.

Emissions can refer to all greenhouse gases or only to carbon dioxide (CO_{2}). Reaching net zero is necessary to slow global warming. It requires deep cuts in emissions, for example by shifting from fossil fuels to sustainable energy, improving energy efficiency and halting deforestation. A small remaining fraction of emissions can then be offset using carbon dioxide removal.

People often use the terms net-zero emissions, carbon neutrality, and climate neutrality with the same meaning. However, in some cases, these terms have different meanings. For example, some standards for carbon neutral certification allow a lot of carbon offsetting. But net zero standards require reducing emissions to more than 90% and then only offsetting the remaining 10% or less to fall in line with 1.5 °C targets. Organizations often offset their residual emissions by buying carbon credits.

In the early 2020s net zero became the main framework for climate action. Many countries and organizations are setting net zero targets. As of November 2023, around 145 countries had announced or are considering net zero targets, covering close to 90% of global emissions. They include some countries that were resistant to climate action in previous decades. Country-level net zero targets now cover 92% of global GDP, 88% of emissions, and 89% of the world population. 65% of the largest 2,000 publicly traded companies by annual revenue have net zero targets. Among Fortune 500 companies, the percentage is 63%. Company targets can result from both voluntary action and government regulation.

As of 2023, only 5% of corporations who published a net zero commitment had a credible implementation plan. While 61% of global carbon dioxide emissions are covered by some sort of net zero target, credible targets cover only 7% of emissions. This low credibility reflects a lack of binding regulation. It is also due to the need for continued innovation and investment to make decarbonization possible.

To date, 27 countries have enacted domestic net zero legislation. These are laws that contain net zero targets or equivalent. There is currently no national regulation in place that legally requires companies based in that country to achieve net zero. However several countries, for example Switzerland, are developing such legislation.

== History and scientific justification ==
The idea of net-zero came out of research in the late 2000s into how the atmosphere, oceans and carbon cycle were reacting to CO_{2} emissions. This research found that global warming will significantly slow down only if CO_{2} emissions are reduced to net zero, although existing greenhouse gases in the atmosphere will still contribute to continued warming. Net-zero was basic to the goals of the Paris Agreement. This stated that the world must "achieve a balance between anthropogenic emissions by sources and removals by sinks of greenhouse gases in the second half of this century". The term "net zero" gained popularity after the Intergovernmental Panel on Climate Change published its Special Report on Global Warming of 1.5 °C (SR15) in October of 2018, this report stated that "Reaching and sustaining net zero global anthropogenic [human-caused] CO_{2} emissions and declining net non-CO_{2} radiative forcing would halt anthropogenic global warming on multi-decadal timescales (high confidence)." An influential and now highly-cited scientific review on "Net-zero emissions energy systems" was also published in June of 2018, which was the first to assess the special challenges of not just reducing energy-related GHG emissions but actually reaching net-zero.

The idea of net-zero emissions is often confused with "stabilization of greenhouse gas concentrations in the atmosphere", a term from the 1992 Rio Convention. The two concepts are not the same. This is because the carbon cycle continuously sequesters or absorbs a small portion of human-caused atmospheric CO_{2} into vegetation and the ocean, even after CO_{2} emissions are reduced to zero. If CO_{2} emissions from human activities are reduced to net zero, the concentration of CO_{2} in the atmosphere would decline. This would be at a rate just fast enough to compensate for the slow warming of the deep ocean. The result would be approximately constant global average surface temperatures over decades or centuries. In contrast, stabilising atmospheric CO_{2} concentrations would allow for some ongoing emissions, but global temperatures would continue to rise over many centuries due to the ocean's delayed response to warming.

=== Types of greenhouse gas ===
It will be quicker to reach net-zero emissions for CO_{2} alone rather than CO_{2} plus other greenhouse gases like methane, nitrous oxide and fluorinated gases. The net-zero target date for non-CO_{2} emissions is later partly because modellers assume that some of these emissions such as methane from farming are harder to phase out. Emissions of short-lived gases such as methane do not accumulate in the climate system in the same way that CO_{2} does. Therefore there is no need to reduce them to zero to halt global warming. This is because reductions in emissions of short-lived gases cause an immediate decline in the resulting radiative forcing. Radiative forcing is the change in the Earth's energy balance that they cause. However, these potent but short-lived gases will drive temperatures higher in the short term. This could possibly push the rise in temperature past the 1.5 °C threshold much earlier. A comprehensive net-zero emissions target would include all greenhouse gases.

Some targets aim to reach net-zero emissions only for carbon dioxide. Others aim to reach net-zero emissions of all greenhouse gases. Robust net zero standards state that all greenhouse gases should be covered by a given actor's targets.

Some authors say that carbon neutrality strategies focus only on carbon dioxide, but net zero includes all greenhouse gases. However some publications, such as the national strategy of France, use the term "carbon neutral" to mean net reductions of all greenhouse gases. The United States has pledged to achieve "net zero" emissions by 2050. As of March 2021 it had not specified which greenhouse gases will be included in its target.

== Terminology ==
Countries, local governments, corporations, and financial institutions may all announce pledges for achieving to reach net-zero emissions.

In climate change discussions, the terms net zero, carbon neutrality, and climate neutrality are often used as if they mean the same thing. In some contexts, however, they have different meanings from each other. The sections below explain this. People often use these terms without rigorous standard definitions. António Guterres, the UN secretary-general, announced at COP 26 in 2021 that the UN was commissioning a group of experts to propose standards in meaning and measurement to promote more consistent use of terminology on the part of non-state actors.

== Approaches ==
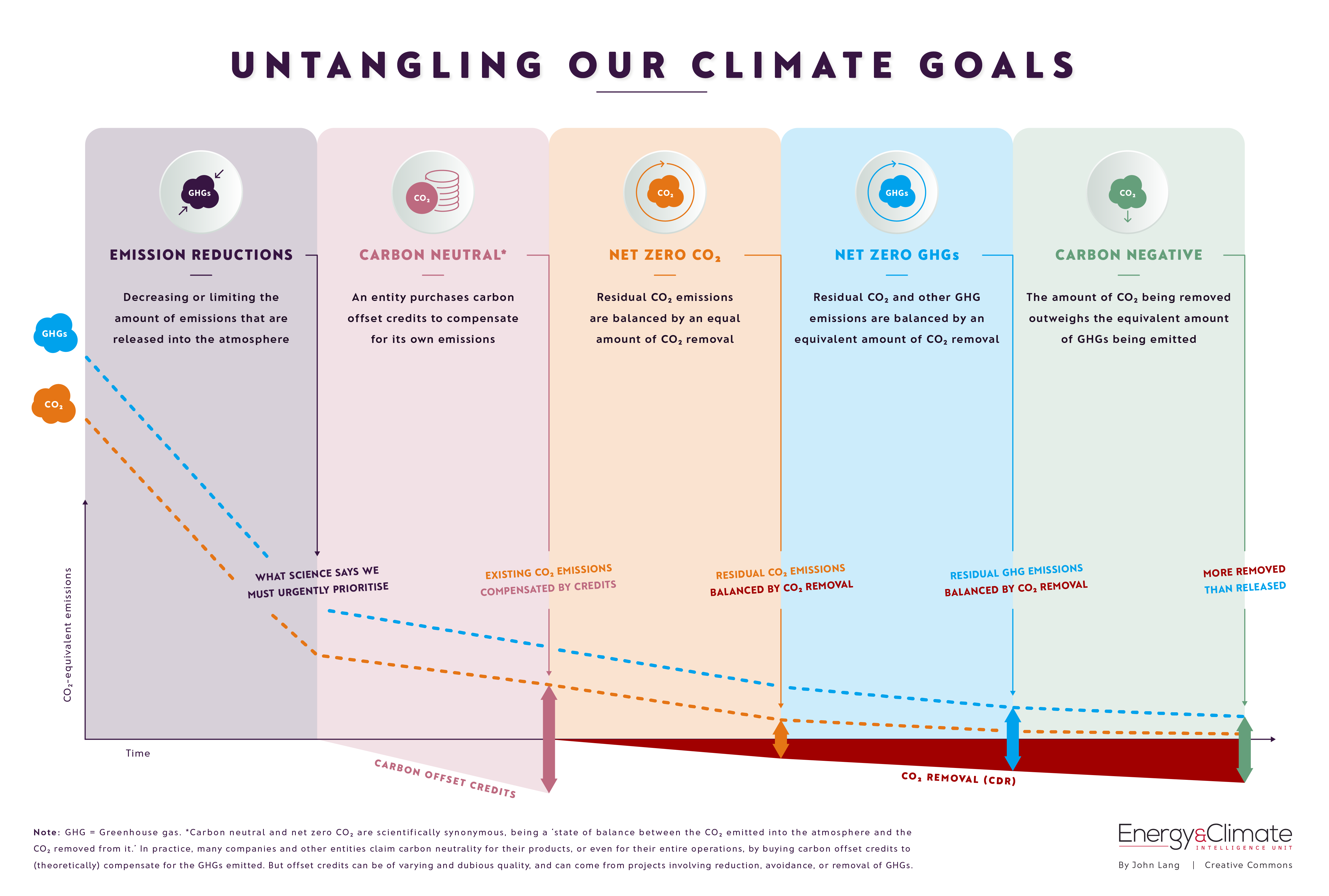
The terms 'carbon neutral' and 'net zero' are often used interchangeably by politicians, businesses and scientists. Some experts use the terms differently, as illustrated by this graphic.

A given actor may plan to achieve net-zero emissions through a combination of approaches. These would include (1) actions to reduce their own emissions, (2) actions to reduce the emissions of others (third parties), and (3) actions to directly remove carbon dioxide from the atmosphere (carbon sinks).

=== Reducing emissions ===
Robust net zero standards require actors to reduce their own emissions as much as possible following science-based pathways. They must then balance their residual emissions using removals and offsets. This typically involves shifting from fossil fuels to sustainable energy sources. Residual emissions are emissions that are not practical to reduce for technological reasons.

Another key measure to reduce emissions is increasing efficiency. Historically, improved energy efficiency has been the most successful measure to reduce emissions. Policies to improve efficiencies include setting fuel efficiency standards for cars and promoting building insulation and public transport.

Experts and net zero frameworks disagree over the exact percentage of residual emissions that may be allowed. Most guidance suggests this should be limited to a small fraction of total emissions. Sector-specific and geographical factors would determine how much. The Science Based Targets initiative says that residual emissions across most sectors should fall to below 10% of an organization's baseline emissions by 2050. It should be even lower for some sectors with competitive alternatives like the power sector. Sectors such as heavy manufacturing where it is harder to mitigate emissions will probably have a higher percentage of residual emissions by 2050.

The ISO and British Standards Institution (BSI) publish "carbon neutrality" standards that have higher tolerance for residual emissions than "net zero" standards. For example, BSI PAS 2060 is a British standard for measuring carbon neutrality. According to these standards, carbon neutrality is a short-term target, and net zero is a longer-term target.

=== Carbon removals and offsets ===
To balance residual emissions, actors may take direct action to remove carbon dioxide from the atmosphere and sequester it. Alternatively or in addition they can buy carbon credits that "offset" emissions. Carbon credits can be used to fund carbon removal projects such as reforestation.

Strong standards such as the ISO and BSI "net zero" standards only allow removal-based offsets that have the same permanence as the greenhouse gases that they balance. The term for this concept is "like for like" removals. Permanence means that removals must store greenhouse gases for the same period as the lifetime of the GHG emissions they balance. For example, methane has a lifetime of around 12 years in the atmosphere. Carbon dioxide lasts between 300 and 1,000 years. Accordingly, removals that balance carbon dioxide must last much longer than removals that balance methane.

Carbon credits can also fund initiatives that aim to avoid emissions. One example would be energy efficiency retrofits or renewable energy projects. Avoided emissions offsets result from actions that reduce emissions relative to a baseline or status quo. But they do not remove emissions from the atmosphere. Weak standards such as ISO and BSI "carbon neutrality" standards allow organizations to use avoided-emissions carbon credits. They do not specify how permanent or durable a credit must be.

Carbon offsetting has been criticized on several fronts. One important concern is that offsets may delay active emissions reductions. In a 2007 report from the Transnational Institute, Kevin Smith likened carbon offsets to medieval indulgences. He said they allowed people to pay "offset companies to absolve them of their carbon sins." He said this permits a "business as usual" attitude that stifles required major changes. Many people have criticized offsets for playing a part in greenwashing. This argument appeared in a 2021 watchdog ruling against Shell.

Loose regulation of claims by carbon offsetting schemes combined with the difficulties in calculating greenhouse gas sequestration and emissions reductions has also given rise to criticism. This argument is that this can result in schemes that do not adequately offset emissions in reality. There have been moves to create better regulation. The United Nations has operated a certification process for carbon offsets since 2001. This is called the Clean Development Mechanism. It aims to stimulate "sustainable development and emission reductions, while giving industrialized countries some flexibility in how they meet their emission reduction limitation targets". The UK Government's Climate Change Committee says reported emissions reductions or removals may have happened anyway or. not last into the future. This is despite an improvement in standards globally and in the UK.

There has also been criticisms of non-native and monocultural forest plantations as carbon offsets. This is because of their "limited—and at times negative—effects on native biodiversity" and other ecosystem services.

Most of the carbon credits on the voluntary market today do not meet UN, UNFCCC, ISO or SBTi standards for permanent carbon dioxide removals. As a result, significant investment in carbon capture and permanent geological storage will most likely be necessary to achieve net-zero targets by mid-century.

== Implementation ==
Since 2015, there has been significant growth in the number of actors pledging net-zero emissions. Many standards have emerged that interpret the net zero concept and aim to measure progress towards net zero targets. Some of these standards are more robust than others. Some people have criticized weak standards for facilitating greenwashing. The UN, UNFCCC, International Organization for Standardization (ISO), and the Science Based Targets initiative (SBTi) promote more robust standards.

The "United Nations High-Level Expert Group" on the net-zero emissions commitments of non-state entities has made several recommendations for non-state actors. Non-state actors include cities, regional governments, financial institutions, and corporations. One of these is not financing new fossil fuel development. Another is supporting strong climate policy. And another is ensuring that business activities and investments do not contribute to deforestation.

65% of the largest 2,000 publicly traded companies by annual revenue have net zero targets. Among Fortune 500 companies the percentage is 63%. Company targets can result from both voluntary action and government regulation.

=== Scopes of emissions sources ===
The Greenhouse Gas Protocol is a group of standards that are the most common in GHG accounting. These standards reflect a number of accounting principles. They include relevance, completeness, consistency, transparency, and accuracy. The standards divide emissions into three scopes:

- Scope 1 covers all direct GHG emissions within a corporate boundary (owned or controlled by a company). It includes fuel burned by the company, use of company vehicles, and fugitive emissions.
- Scope 2 covers indirect GHG emissions from consumption of purchased electricity, heat, cooling or steam. As of 2010, at least one third of global GHG emissions are Scope 2.
- Scope 3 emission sources include emissions from suppliers and product users (also known as the "value chain"). Transportation of goods, and other indirect emissions are also part of this scope. Scope 3 emissions were estimated to represent 75% of all emissions reported to the Carbon Disclosure Project, though that percentage varies widely amongst business sectors.

Corporate net zero targets vary in how widely they cover emissions related to the company's activities. This can greatly affect the volume of emissions that are counted. Some oil companies, for instance, claim that their operations (Scopes 1 and 2) produce net-zero emissions. These claims do not cover the emissions produced when the oil is burned by its customers, which are 70 - 90% of oil-related emissions. This is because they count as Scope 3 emissions.

Robust net zero standards require Scope 3 emissions to be counted, but "carbon neutrality" standards do not.

=== Timeframe ===
To achieve net zero, actors are encouraged to set net zero targets for 2050 or earlier. Long-term net zero targets should be supplemented by interim targets for every one to five years. The UN, UNFCCC, ISO, and SBTi all say that organizations should prioritize early, front-loaded emissions reduction. They say they should aim to halve emissions by 2030. Specific emissions reduction targets and pathways may look different for different sectors. Some may be able to decarbonize more quickly and easily than others.

Many companies often claim a commitment to reach net-zero emissions by the year 2050. These promises are often made at the corporate level. Both governments and international agencies encourage businesses to contribute to a national, or international, net zero pledge. The International Energy Agency says that global investment in low carbon substitutes for fossil fuels needs to reach US$4 trillion annually by 2030 for the world to get to net zero by 2050.

Some analyses have raised concerns that net zero cannot be achieved worldwide by 2050.

On average, approximately 29% of companies in EU member states have formulated a respective target to achieve net zero or have already reached this goal. However, these numbers can vary significantly across different industries, countries, and firm sizes. External pressures, such as companies' exposure to risks associated with climate change and its perception as a problem, can influence a company's ambition to adopt specific targets and strategies.

=== Comprehensive accounting ===
The guidance from standards institutions says that organizations should choose a base year to measure emissions reductions against. This should be representative of their typical greenhouse gas profile. They should explain the choice of baseline and how they will account for changes in conditions since the baseline. Financial organizations should also include emissions within their portfolio. This should include all organizations they have financed, invested in, or insured. Countries and regions should include both territorial emissions released within their boundaries and consumption emissions related to products and services imported and consumed within their boundaries.

Cities and countries pose a challenge when it comes to calculating emissions. This is because the production of products and services within their boundaries might be linked to either internal consumption or exports. At the same time the population also consumes imported products and services. So it is important to state explicitly whether emissions are counted at the location of production or consumption. This helps to prevent double counting. The lengthy manufacturing chains of a globalised market might make this challenging. There are additional challenges with looking at renewable energy systems and electric vehicle batteries. This is because the necessary embodied energy and other effects of raw material extraction are often significant when measuring life-cycle emissions. However the local emissions at the place they are used may be small.

=== Standards for products ===
Leading standards and guidance allow official accreditation bodies to certify products as carbon neutral but not as net zero. The rationale behind this is that until organizations and their supply chains are on track for net zero, allowing a product to claim to be net zero at this point would be disingenuous and lead to greenwashing.

=== Financial impact ===
The International Monetary Fund estimates that compared to current government policies, shifting policies to bring emissions to net zero by 2050 would result in global gross domestic product (GDP) being 7 percent higher. In its estimates, the cost of emissions reductions in 2050 is less than 2% of world GDP, and the cost savings from reducing the effects of climate change are approximately 9% of world GDP.

== Politics ==
In the mid-2020s net zero became more politically divisive in some places, such as the USA, EU and UK. As part of the politics of climate change it has been argued that "policymakers need to engage in complex confrontational politics if we want to secure the transition to net zero" and that "the path to net zero must be shaped politically". Some politicians, like Chris Wright, have described net zero targets as harmful or too expensive. Some media says net zero will increase prices. However it has been argued that they are misrepresenting the economics of climate change and that net zero is cheaper than not zero.

There are also implications for the workforce that will have political implications, with some industries and regions more at risk than others. In the UK for example, London and the South East have more jobs in the service sector that are likely to be less affected compared to heavy industry concentrated in the Midlands and the North.

It is argued that net zero in India "will largely depend upon the synergy between national and state government policies and actions across various economic and social sectors".

Some cattle farmers are lobbying for GWP*, (Note: A measure of the change in global warming potential (GWP) over a period of time compared to the global warming potential at a selected base year.) which has been described as "dangerous".

== Effects ==
Evidence suggests that high-emission countries pursuing net zero policies enjoy the benefits of an increase in public health, and that the attendant cost benefit more than offsets the costs of policy implementation.

== Targets ==
As of November 2023, around 145 countries had announced or are considering net zero targets, covering close to 90% of global emissions. They include some countries that were resistant to climate action in previous decades. Country-level net zero targets now cover 92% of global GDP, 88% of emissions and 89% of the world population.

According to World Population Review, a number of countries have net zero, or net negative carbon emissions: Bhutan, Comoros, Gabon, Guyana, Madagascar, Panama, and Suriname. However, according to the World Resources Institute, all of these countries have net positive greenhouse gas emissions. These countries generally have a high level of forestation.

=== By country ===
- European Green Deal
- Climate policy of China
- Carbon neutrality in India
- Carbon neutrality in the United States

=== Credibility ===
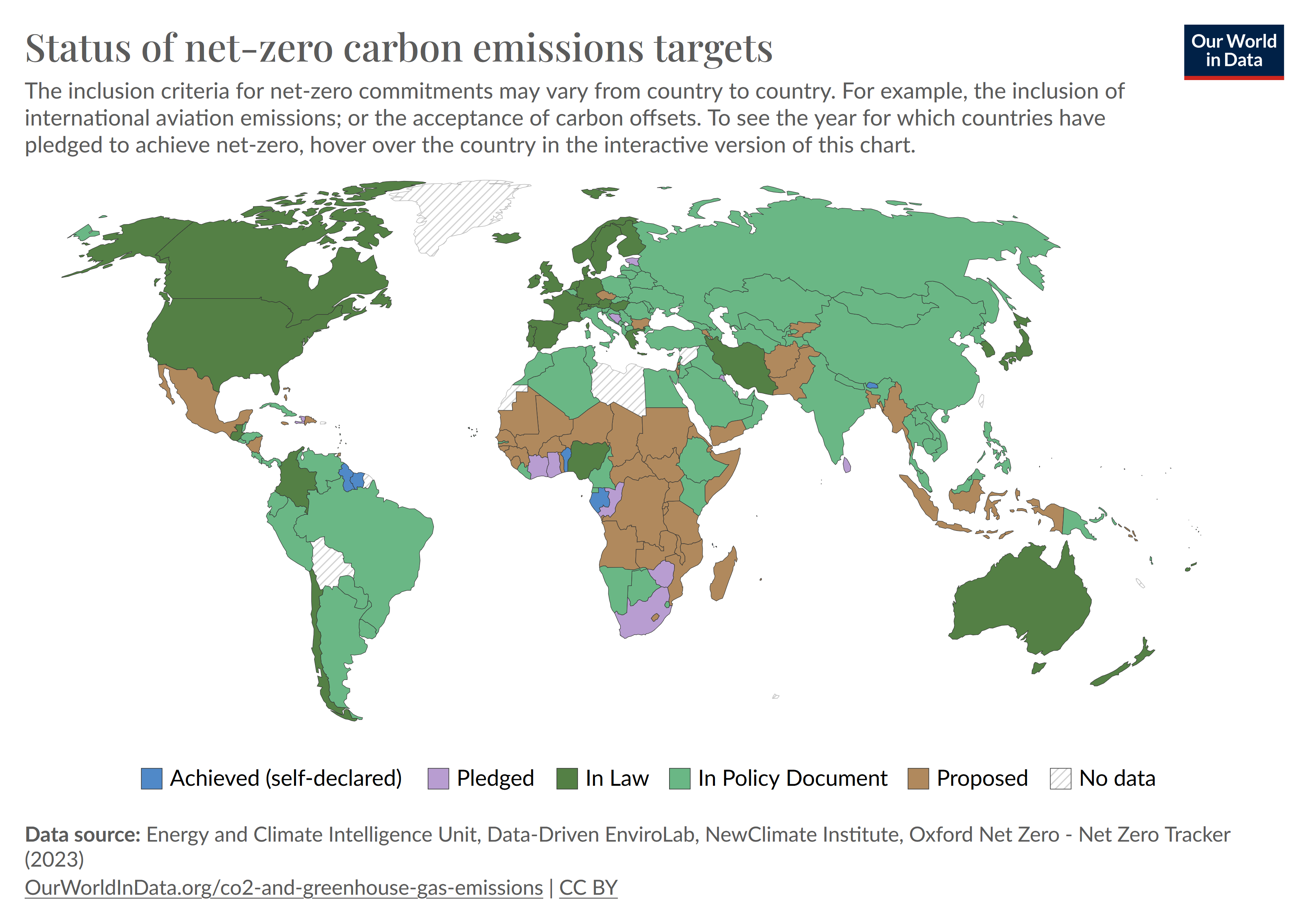
Status of net-zero carbon emissions targets as of October, 2023. The inclusion criteria for net-zero commitments may vary from country to country.

The credibility of net-zero targets remains low. There is no binding regulation requiring a transition to net zero, so the overwhelming majority of net zero commitments have been made on a voluntary basis. The lack of an enforcement mechanism surrounding these claims means that many are dubious. In many sectors such as steel, cement, and chemicals, the pathway to reaching net zero in terms of technology remains unclear. Further investment in research and innovation and further regulation will probably be necessary if net zero claims are to become more credible.

Tzeporah Berman, chair of the Fossil Fuel Non-Proliferation Treaty Initiative, has criticized net zero claims by fossil fuel companies, describing them as "delusional and based on bad science".

A consortium of climate scientists has tracked net zero commitments. Their research found that net pledges drafted in law or policy documentation have grown from 7% of countries in 2020 to 75% in 2023. However, very few have met the minimum requirements for a "decent pledge". The UN Race to Zero campaign calls them "starting line criteria". This states that they must have a "plan and published evidence of action taken towards reaching the target" besides a stated pledge.

At the 2022 United Nations Climate Change Conference (COP27), the High-Level Expert Group on the net-zero emissions commitments of non-state entities of the United Nations formed the previous March by U.N. Secretary-General António Guterres and chaired by former Canadian Minister of Environment and Climate Change Catherine McKenna released a report that stated that the carbon neutrality pledges of many corporations, local governments, regional governments, and financial institutions around the world often amount to nothing more than greenwashing and provided 10 recommendations to ensure greater credibility and accountability for carbon neutrality pledges such as requiring non-state actors to publicly disclose and report verifiable information (e.g. greenhouse gas inventories and carbon footprint accounting in prospectus for financial securities) that substantiates compliance with such pledges.

Following the release of the report, Net Zero Tracker, a research consortium that includes the NewClimate Institute, the Energy and Climate Intelligence Unit, the Data-Driven EnviroLab of the University of North Carolina at Chapel Hill, and the Net Zero Initiative at the University of Oxford issued a report evaluating the climate neutrality pledges of 116 of 713 regional governments, of 241 of 1,177 cities with populations greater than 500,000, and of 1,156 of 2,000 publicly listed companies in the 25 countries with the greatest emissions (whose pledges cover more than 90% of the gross world product) by the recommendations of the UN report and found that many of these pledges were largely unsubstantiated and more than half of cities had no plan for tracking and reporting compliance with pledges.

== Challenges ==
=== Deferring present-day emissions reductions ===
Climate scientists James Dyke, Bob Watson, and Wolfgang Knorr argue that the concept of net zero has been harmful for emissions reductions. This is because it allows actors to defer present-day emissions reductions by relying on future, unproved technological fixes such as carbon dioxide removal. "The problems come when it is assumed that these [technological fixes] can be deployed at vast scale. This effectively serves as a blank cheque for the continued burning of fossil fuels and the acceleration of habitat destruction", they said. By tracing the history of previous failures in climate policy at reducing emissions from 1988 to 2021, they said they "[arrive] at the painful realisation that the idea of net zero has licensed a recklessly cavalier 'burn now, pay later' approach which has seen carbon emissions continue to soar". They concluded: "Current net zero policies will not keep warming to within 1.5 °C because they were never intended to. They were and still are driven by a need to protect business as usual, not the climate. If we want to keep people safe then large and sustained cuts to carbon emissions need to happen now. [...] The time for wishful thinking is over."

=== Carbon credits ===
One of the main reasons for the low credibility of many net zero claims is their heavy reliance on carbon credits. Carbon credits are often used for offsetting. They reduce or remove emissions of carbon dioxide or other greenhouse gases in order to compensate for emissions made elsewhere. Many fossil fuel companies have made commitments to be net zero by 2050. At the same time they continue to increase greenhouse gas emissions by extracting and producing fossil fuels. They claim that they will use carbon credits and carbon capture technology in order to continue extracting and burning fossil fuels. The UN has condemned such pledges as dangerous examples of greenwashing.

Offset projects themselves could have harmful effects. The ISO Net Zero Guidelines say that net zero strategies should align with the United Nations Sustainable Development Goals. This is in order to "support equity and global transition to a net-zero economy, and any subsequent UN global goals which supersede the 2030 SDGs". The UNFCCC's Race to Zero campaign says emissions reductions and removals should "safeguard the rights of the most vulnerable people and communities". It says that organizations should disclose how they will support communities affected by climate impacts and climate transition.

== See also ==
- Carbon budget – Limit on carbon dioxide emission for a given climate impact
- Carbon footprint – Concept for greenhouse gas emissions analysis
- Carbon Neutral Cities Alliance – Green energy alliance
- Carbon Neutrality Coalition – International environment organization
- Low-carbon economy – Climate-friendly economy
- Nationally determined contribution – Component of international climate change agreements
- Renewable natural gas – Methane-enriched biogas
