= List of international prime ministerial trips made by Christopher Luxon =

This is a list of international prime ministerial trips made by Christopher Luxon, the 42nd prime minister of New Zealand.

Christopher Luxon, who took the office of prime minister on 27 November 2023, made his first prime ministerial trip to Sydney on 20 December 2023 to meet with his Australian counter-part, Anthony Albanese.

== Summary ==
The number of visits per country where Prime Minister Luxon traveled are:

- One: Belgium, Fiji, Japan, Laos, Netherlands, Niue, (Note: The Cook Islands and Niue are associated states of New Zealand.) Palau, Peru, the Philippines, Solomon Islands, Thailand, Turkey, the United Arab Emirates, the United States, the United Kingdom, Vatican City and Vietnam
- Two: China, India, Malaysia, Papua New Guinea, Samoa, Singapore, South Korea, Tonga
- Four: Australia

World map highlighting countries visited by Christopher Luxon, as of 21 November 2026. One visit Two visits Three visits Four visits New Zealand

== 2023 ==
Country	Locations	Dates	Details
Australia	Sydney	20 December	Luxon met with Australian Prime Minister Anthony Albanese and affirmed New Zealand's nuclear-free policy, but expressed openness to joining the non-nuclear pillar of the AUKUS agreement. He also stated that New Zealand was keen to do its share of "heavy lifting" in the Australia-New Zealand defence relationship.

== 2024 ==
Country	Locations	Dates	Details
Australia	Melbourne	5–6 March	Luxon was invited to attend the Australia-ASEAN Summit. Luxon met with Bruneian Sultan Hassanal Bolkiah, Malaysian Prime Minister Anwar Ibrahim, Thai Prime Minister Srettha Thavisin, Indonesian President Joko Widodo, Singaporean Prime Minister Lee Hsien Loong, Australian Prime Minister Anthony Albanese, and Victoria Premier Jacinta Allan. He also spoke at the business breakfast hosted by ANZ and met with Trans-Tasman business leaders. Luxon had to fly commercially from Wellington to Auckland and then to Melbourne due to maintenance issues on the New Zealand Defence Force Boeing 757 aircraft.
Singapore	Singapore	15–16 April	Luxon met with Singaporean Prime Minister Lee Hsien Loong, Singaporean President Tharman Shanmugaratnam, and Singaporean Deputy Prime Minister Lawrence Wong, who was nominated to be the next prime minister. He attended a panel discussion on economic issues which was hosted by ANZ. He visited the Singapore Botanic Gardens where an orchid variety was named after him called "Dendrobium Christopher Luxon". He attended the See Tomorrow First event by New Zealand Trade and Enterprise agency. Luxon met with Singaporean YouTuber Aiken Chia and ate breakfast together at a hawker centre. He visited Google's regional headquarters in Singapore. He visited PSB Academy and announced Massey University's joint venture with PSB Academy in offering Masters and Bachelors degrees in Master of Analytics, Bachelor of Design, Bachelor of Information Science and Cyber Security.
Thailand	Bangkok	17–18 April	Luxon met with Thai Prime Minister Srettha Thavisin. He visited the One City Centre in Bangkok which is the tallest office building in Thailand at 276 meters tall and met with representatives from the New Zealand company Beca Group who provided engineering services for the structure. He attended the New Zealand Alumni Networking Event where he met with alumni from New Zealand universities who live in Thailand and also presented an award. Luxon got in an auto rickshaw, also known as tuk-tuk, and rode around.
Philippines	Manila	19–20 April	Luxon met with Filipino President Bongbong Marcos and Filipino First Lady Liza Araneta Marcos at the Malacañang Palace. Luxon arrived in Manila with New Zealand Member of Parliament Paulo Garcia, who is the first New Zealand MP of Filipino descent, and they visited a Jollibee restaurant where they ate together and talked with the employees. He met with Frederick Go, the Special Assistant to the President for Investment and Economic Affairs. Luxon met with the Makati Business Club and the Philippines New Zealand Business Council at an event where they discussed business opportunities between New Zealand and the Philippines. He attended the signing of an energy transition cooperation and a strategic economic partnership with Filipino conglomerate Ayala Corporation, the oldest and largest conglomerate of the Philippines.
Niue	Alofi, Avatele, Tamakautoga	3–5 June	Luxon met with Niuean Premier Dalton Tagelagi as Niue marked 50 years of self-government in free association with New Zealand. Luxon announced that New Zealand would invest NZ$20.5 million into a new large-scale renewable energy project on Niue.
Fiji	Suva, Nadi	5–6 June	Luxon met with Fijian Prime Minister Sitiveni Rabuka. Luxon announced nearly NZ$27 million in investment in projects in Fiji and the removal of transit visas for Fijian nationals entering New Zealand.
Papua New Guinea	Port Moresby	16 June	Luxon met with Papua New Guinean Prime Minister James Marape during a refuelling stop. Due to maintenance issues with the New Zealand Defence Force Boeing 757 aircraft, Luxon had to fly commercially from Port Moresby to Tokyo via Hong Kong.
Japan	Tokyo	17–20 June	Luxon led a business delegation that engaged in deals in space, renewable energy, and investment, such as Rocket Lab's deal with Japanese satellite provider Synspective for ten Electron launches from Mahia Peninsula. Luxon stopped by a Costco store that carried New Zealand-made products like Zespri kiwifruit, went to a sushi restaurant, and met Japanese celebrities. Luxon visited the Yokosuka Naval Base, where he announced that the New Zealand Defence Force would enhance its participation in North Korea sanctions monitoring in Japan. Luxon attended an event on foreign policy hosted by the Institute for International Socio-Economic Studies and NEC, where he delivered a speech on security in the Pacific region. Luxon met with Japanese Defence Minister Minoru Kihara and had a bilateral meeting with Japanese Prime Minister Fumio Kishida, where he signed a bilateral information security agreement to improve intelligence sharing between the two governments.
United States	Washington, D.C., San Francisco	9–11 July	Luxon attended the 2024 Nato summit as an Indo-Pacific ally, where he attended a White House dinner and spoke to US President Joe Biden, British Prime Minister Keir Starmer, and Republican Senator Bill Hagerty. Later that day, Luxon met with Ukrainian President Volodymyr Zelenskyy, Japanese Prime Minister Fumio Kishida, South Korean President Yoon Suk Yeol, and Australian Deputy Prime Minister Richard Marles during an Indo-Pacific meeting to express solidarity with Ukraine. During his trip to the United States, Luxon also committed NZ$16 million to support Ukraine in its war against Russia. Luxon also met members of the US administration and Congress, including Republican Congressman Michael McCaul, Democratic Congressman Gregory Meeks, Democratic Senators Ben Cardin and Jon Ossoff, and Republican Senator Jim Risch. On the final day of his trip, Luxon visited San Francisco, where he met Californian Governor Gavin Newsom.
Australia	Sydney, Canberra	15–16 August	Luxon visited Australia to strengthen the relationship between the two countries, focussing on enhancing security and economic ties. In Sydney, Luxon discussed infrastructure issues, learning from New South Wales' experience managing significant infrastructure projects. He also met with the New South Wales Government, addressed the Lowy Institute, and engaged with Australian business leaders and investors. The next day, Luxon attended the annual Australia-New Zealand Leaders' Meeting in Canberra, where he discussed global issues, Pacific priorities, and enhancing defence coordination. He met with Australian Prime Minister Anthony Albanese to discuss global issues and shared interests, concluding with a joint statement highlighting the strengthened trans-Tasman alliance and commitment to modern challenges.
Tonga	Nukuʻalofa	27–30 August	Luxon attended the 2024 Pacific Islands Forum Leaders meeting. Luxon met with Tongan Prime Minister Siaosi Sovaleni, Samoan Prime Minister Fiamē Naomi Mataʻafa, and Australian Prime Minister Anthony Albanese. Luxon engaged in bilateral meetings with the Tongan leaders, such as renewing New Zealand's Statement of Partnership with Tonga and committing to work in cooperation in areas such as climate change, security, education, and trade. The leaders welcomed progress on two key infrastructure projects funded by New Zealand, including a second undersea telecommunications cable and a new Parliament complex.
Malaysia	Putrajaya	1–3 September	Luxon led a business delegation and met with Malaysian Prime Minister Anwar Ibrahim, where they released a joint statement reaffirming their countries' commitment to regional defence and security cooperation. Luxon announced the goal of increasing bilateral trade between the countries by 50% over the next six years, as well as reviewing the Malaysia-New Zealand Free Trade Agreement. He also announced expanded cooperation in education, youth and sports connections, and disaster management. Luxon addressed business leaders, such as the Kuala Lumpur Business Club, and visited Masjid Negara and laid a wreath at Tugu Negara.
South Korea	Seoul	4–5 September	Luxon met with South Korean President Yoon Suk Yeol, where they released a joint statement reaffirming their commitment to enhancing regional security and expanding trade ties. Luxon also visited the Demilitarised Zone (DMZ), which separates North and South Korea. Accompanied by a business delegation, Luxon observed several agreements being signed between New Zealand and Korean businesses, particularly in the sectors of energy, education, and food and beverage.
Laos	Vientiane	10–11 October	Luxon attended the Nineteenth East Asia Summit. During the conference, Luxon bilateral meetings with the leaders of Cambodia, India, the Philippines, Vietnam and Thailand including Indian Prime Minister Narendra Modi. He also gave a speech to the ASEAN Business and Investment Summit and confirmed that New Zealand would be participating in the ASEAN-New Zealand Commemorative Leaders' Summit in Malaysia in November 2025.
Samoa	Apia	25–26 October	Luxon attended the 2024 Commonwealth Heads of Government Meeting. He and Foreign Minister Winston Peters jointly announced that New Zealand would contribute $20 million to the Pacific Resilience Facility, which aims to help Pacific states prepare for disasters and boost climate resilience.
Peru	Lima	15–16 November	Luxon attended the 2024 APEC Summit. On 16 November, he also met with General Secretary of the Chinese Communist Party Xi Jinping to discuss human rights, tensions in the South China Sea and cooperation with the Pacific Islands Forum. The two leaders also discussed their governments' disagreements about New Zealand's involvement in the AUKUS security pact. In addition, Luxon met with United States President Joe Biden and Secretary of State Antony Blinken to reaffirm friendly bilateral relations.

== 2025 ==
Country	Locations	Dates	Details
United Arab Emirates	Abu Dhabi	13 January	Luxon accompanied Trade Minister Todd McClay during the signing of the New Zealand-United Arab Emirates comprehensive economic partnership agreement, which lifts tariffs on 98.5% of New Zealand exports to that country.
Vietnam	Hanoi, Ho Chi Minh City	26–27 February	Luxon, Minister of State for Trade and Investment Nicola Grigg and a business delegation visited to Vietnam to promote economic and educational relations. On 26 February, Luxon also delivered a keynote address at an ASEAN "future forum" in Hanoi and met with General Secretary of the Communist Party of Vietnam Tô Lâm, President Lương Cường and Vietnamese Prime Minister Phạm Minh Chính. On 27 February, Luxon and Pham agreed to upgrade diplomatic relations and sign a comprehensive strategic partnership.
India	Delhi, Mumbai	15–19 March	Luxon and Trade Minister Todd McClay led a trade delegation to India. The New Zealand and Indian governments agreed to commence free trade negotiations commencing in April 2025. Luxon also met with Indian Prime Minister Narendra Modi to discuss defence and security cooperation. The two leaders signed a bilateral defence agreement. In addition, Modi raised concerns about so-called "anti-India" activities in New Zealand.
United Kingdom	London	21–23 April	Luxon traveled to the United Kingdom to meet with King Charles III and British Prime Minister Keir Starmer on 22 April to reaffirm bilateral defence and trade ties.
Turkey	Istanbul, Gallipoli	24–25 April	Luxon traveled to Istanbul and Gallipoli to mark the 110th anniversary of the landing at Anzac Cove. This marked the first visit by a New Zealand Prime Minister to Turkey since 2015.
Vatican City	Vatican City	26 April	Luxon attended the funeral of Pope Francis.
China	Beijing, Shanghai	17–20 June	On 18 June, Luxon, Louise Upston and Mark Mitchell led a business delegation to Shanghai. New Zealand business leaders reportedly signed NZ$871 million worth of commercial agreements with their Chinese counterparts. Luxon also visited Fudan University to promote Sino-New Zealand educational ties and met with Party Secretary of Shanghai Chen Jining to discuss bilateral trade with New Zealand. On 19 June, Luxon announced that Chinese nationals would no longer need to apply for transit visas from November 2025 and would be eligible for the New Zealand Electronic Travel Authority (NZeTA). On 20 June, Luxon and the New Zealand delegation met CCP General Secretary Xi Jinping and Chinese Premier Li Qiang to discuss trade and other bilateral and global issues. During the meeting, Luxon expressed disagreement with NATO Secretary General Mark Rutte's remarks that China was working with Russia, Iran and North Korea against the West.
Belgium	Brussels	21–23 June	Luxon paid tribute to New Zealand soldiers who fought during the Battle of Ypres in the First World War. He attended the Last Post ceremony at the Menin Gate.
Netherlands	The Hague	24–25 June	Luxon attended the 2025 Nato summit. Luxon met with several European and international leaders including NATO Secretary-General Mark Rutte, High Representative of the Union for Foreign Affairs and Security Policy Kaja Kallas, Australian Deputy Prime Minister Richard Marles, Ukrainian president Volodymyr Zelenskyy, Canadian Prime Minister Mark Carney and the foreign ministers of South Korea and Japan Takeshi Iwaya. During a meeting with the Indo-Pacific 4 grouping, Luxon said that he had asked China "to use any influence it has over North Korea and Russia to reduce harm in the war against Ukraine." He also said the "four powers" Iran, China, North Korea and Russia were working in a "coordinated and concerted" effort against the West.
Papua New Guinea	Port Moresby	4–6 August	Luxon visited the capital Port Moresby to mark the 50th anniversary of Papua New Guinea's independence and 50 years of bilateral relationships.
Solomon Islands	Honiara	8–12 September	Luxon attended the 2025 Pacific Islands Forum Leaders meeting.
Malaysia	Kuala Lumpur	26–28 October	Luxon and his wife Amanda attended the Regional Comprehensive Economic Partnership Summit and the Twentieth East Asia Summit held at the Kuala Lumpur Convention Centre on 27 October. Luxon finalised the New Zealand-ASEAN Comprehensive Strategic Partnership on 28 October in order to boost New Zealand exports to the region while encouraging ASEAN investment in New Zealand. That same day, Luxon announced that New Zealand would seek to boost halal meat exports to Malaysia and would be joining the proposed ASEAN Halal Council.
South Korea	Gyeongju	30 October – 1 November	Luxon attended the 2025 APEC Summit. On 30 October, Luxon had his first in-person meeting with United States President Donald Trump ahead of an APEC banquet hosted by South Korean President Lee Jae Myung. On 31 October, Luxon met with President Lee to discuss bilateral trade relations between New Zealand and South Korea, including New Zealand's plans to enter into a comprehensive strategic partnership with South Korea. On 1 November, Luxon had formal meetings with the leaders of the leaders of the United Arab Emirates, Brunei and Indonesia during the APEC summit. He also informally met with the new Japanese Prime Minister Sanae Takaichi, United States Secretary of the Treasury Scott Bessent and General Secretary of the Chinese Communist Party Xi Jinping.

== 2026 ==
Country	Locations	Dates	Details
Samoa	Apia	15–17 March	Luxon led a parliamentary delegation consisting of Minister for Pacific Peoples Shane Reti, Police Minister Mark Mitchell, Tim van de Molen, Jenny Salesa and Teanau Tuiono to Samoa and Tonga between 15 and 18 March to reaffirm bilateral relations with those countries. Mitchell visited Samoa but did not accompany the delegation to Tonga. Prior to the trip, Luxon's office disputed Samoan Prime Minister Laʻauli Leuatea Schmidt's claim that Luxon had requested a chiefly matai title through the New Zealand High Commissioner. On 16 March, the Samoan government subsequently clarified that Luxon had not requested the matai title and that granting the title was done at their prerogative. Prime Minister La'aulialemalietoa subsequently granted the matai title and urged Luxon to heed a petition to extend New Zealand's visa programme to Samoan nationals. Luxon is expected to highlight New Zealand's efforts to ease travel conditions for Samoans and other Pacific nationals including lowering visa costs, extending visa durations and allowing Pacific passport holders with Australian visa to enter New Zealand through the NZeTA programme. On 17 March, Luxon and La'auli signed memorandums of understanding to strengthen bilateral police and customs cooperation against drug smuggling in the region.
Tonga	Nuku'alofa	18 March	On 18 March, Luxon and Police Commissioner Richard Chambers visited the Tongan Police headquarters where they announced that New Zealand would fund Tonga and Samoa's subscription for the anti-drug Starboard marine surveillance platform; $2 million for social services to help reintegrate Tongan deportees returning from New Zealand; $2.4 million to the Salvation Army's charitable activities in Samoa, Tonga and Fiji; and two new kennels for drug detector dogs. Luxon also met with Tongan Prime Minister Fatafehi Fakafānua and King Tupou VI.
India	New Delhi	27 April	Luxon attended the signing ceremony for the New Zealand–India Free Trade Agreement in New Delhi. The agreement was signed by Trade and Investment Minister Todd McClay and the Indian Commerce and Industry Minister Piyush Goyal in New Delhi.
Singapore	Singapore	4–5 May	Luxon and Singaporean Prime Minister Lawrence Wong signed a "fuel for food" agreement to ensure a steady supply of essential goods such as food, fuel, construction materials and medicines in response to fuel and economic disruptions caused by the 2026 Iran war.
Australia	Brisbane, Noosa Heads	5–6 June	Luxon met with Australian Prime Minister Anthony Albanese for bilateral talks, focusing on bilateral business, trade and defence relations. The two heads of government also opposed China's recent decision to ban four New Zealand Members of Parliament for visiting Taiwan. During the visit, Luxon reaffirmed that his government would continue New Zealand's nuclear-free policy.
Palau	Koror	3–5 September	Luxon attended the 2026 Pacific Islands Forum Leaders meeting.
China	Shenzhen	18–19 November	Luxon attended APEC China 2026 in a caretaker capacity following the 2026 New Zealand general election.

== Future trips ==
Country	Locations	Dates	Details

== Multilateral meetings ==
Prime Minister Luxon is scheduled to attend the following summits during his prime ministership.

Group	Year		
Group	2024	2025	2026
UNGA	26 September,^{[a]} (United States) New York City	26 September,^{[a]} (United States) New York City	28 September,^{[d]} (United States) New York City
APEC	15–16 November, (Peru) Lima	31 October – 1 November, (South Korea) Gyeongju	18–19 November, (China) Shenzhen
EAS (ASEAN)	10–11 October, (Laos) Vientiane	26–28 October, (Malaysia) Kuala Lumpur	16–18 November,^{[a]} (Philippines) Manila
CHOGM	25–26 October, (Samoa) Apia	none	1–4 November,^{[e]} (Antigua and Barbuda) St John's
PIF	27–30 August, (Tonga) Nukuʻalofa	8–12 September, (Solomon Islands) Honiara	3–5 September, (Palau) Koror
NATO	9–11 July, (United States) Washington, D.C.	24–25 June, (Netherlands) The Hague	7–8 July,^{[c]} (Turkey) Ankara
Others	Global Peace Summit; 15–16 June^{[b]} (Switzerland) Lucerne	15 March, (videoconference); United Kingdom	
██ = Future event ██ = Did not attend^a Attended by Minister of Foreign Affairs Winston Peters.^b Attended by Minister of Police Mark Mitchell.^c Attended by Minister of Defence Chris Penk.^d Attended by Permanent Representative Carolyn Schwalger.^e Attended by Special Envoy Gabrielle Rush.

== See also ==
- Sixth National Government of New Zealand
- Cabinet of New Zealand
- Foreign relations of New Zealand
- List of international prime ministerial trips made by Chris Hipkins, his predecessor
- List of international trips made by Winston Peters as Minister of Foreign Affairs of New Zealand
