= List of international prime ministerial trips made by Bill English =

This is a list of international prime ministerial trips made by Bill English, the 39th Prime Minister of New Zealand.

English became Prime Minister of New Zealand on 12 December 2016 and served until 26 October 2017. During his tenure, he made a total of seven international visits. He did not personally attend the 2017 Pacific Islands Forum in Samoa, where New Zealand was represented by Foreign Affairs Minister Gerry Brownlee.

== Summary ==
The number of visits per country or territory where Prime Minister English travelled are:

- One: Belgium, United Kingdom, Germany, Japan, Hong Kong, Samoa, Cook Islands, Niue, Tonga

== 2017 ==
Country	Locations	Dates	Details
Belgium	Brussels	10–12 January 2017	English visited Brussels and met with European Commission President Jean-Claude Juncker and other European Union leaders to discuss the proposed New Zealand–EU free-trade agreement.
United Kingdom	London	13–14 January 2017	English met with British Prime Minister Theresa May at 10 Downing Street, where they discussed the United Kingdom's withdrawal from the European Union and future UK–New Zealand trade relations.
Germany	Berlin	16–17 January 2017	English made his first official visit to Germany as prime minister and met with German Chancellor Angela Merkel. Discussions included bilateral relations, trade and the proposed New Zealand–EU free-trade agreement.
Japan	Tokyo	16–18 May 2017	English met with Japanese Prime Minister Shinzō Abe in Tokyo to discuss bilateral relations, trade and the Trans-Pacific Partnership.
Hong Kong	Hong Kong	18–19 May 2017	English visited Hong Kong to promote New Zealand's economic and trade interests and met with Chief Executive Leung Chun-ying.
Samoa	Apia, Faleula	1–3 June 2017	English visited Samoa to attend celebrations marking the country's 55th anniversary of independence. During the visit, he was bestowed the Samoan Matai title of Leulua'iali'iotumua in the village of Faleula.
Cook Islands Niue Tonga	Rarotonga; Alofi; Nuku'alofa	13–17 June 2017	English led a high-level delegation on the 2017 Pacific Mission to the Cook Islands, Niue and Tonga. The mission focused on regional relations and New Zealand-supported development projects. In the Cook Islands, English announced support for infrastructure projects; in Niue, he opened new facilities and announced support for tourism and renewable energy; and in Tonga, he announced funding for an upgrade of the electricity network.

== See also ==
- Fifth National Government of New Zealand
- Cabinet of New Zealand
- Foreign relations of New Zealand
- List of international prime ministerial trips made by Jacinda Ardern, his successor
