= Type 6 connector =

Type 6 connector (LEVDC)
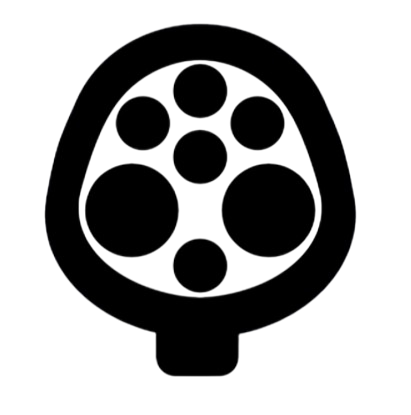
- Type: Electric vehicle charging

Production history
- Designer: Based on CHAdeMO ePTW
- Designed: 2021
- Manufacturer: Multiple
- Produced: 2021–present

General specifications
- External: yes
- Pins: Multiple (DC power and communication)

Electrical
- Earth: yes
- Max. voltage: 120 V DC
- Max. current: 125 A DC

The IS 17017 Type 6 connector (often referred to as LEVDC for Light Electric Vehicle DC or Dash-6) is used for direct current (DC) fast charging of electric two-wheelers and electric three-wheelers, mainly within India. It is one of two DC plug standards described in IS 17017-2 for light electric vehicles. The Type 6 connector is based on the CHAdeMO ePTW (Electric Powered Two-Wheeler) specification and is also recognized internationally as IEC 62196-6 and Taiwan's TES-0D-01-01 standard. The Type 7 connector (IS 17017) (also known as LECCS) is the corresponding combined AC/DC connector standard used in India for light electric vehicles.

Type 6 connectors are derived from the international CHAdeMO ePTW standard, specifically designed for low-voltage DC fast charging applications. The battery management system on the electric vehicle negotiates the maximum current with the electric vehicle supply equipment via dedicated pins in the Type 6 connector using CAN bus communication protocol after the initial control pilot handshake. The Type 6 connectors support DC fast charging up to 12 kW, with current ratings available up to 125 A for vehicles with larger battery packs. Type 6 connectors feature mechanical and electromechanical latches on the charger side, with no latch mechanism required on the vehicle inlet, reducing vehicle-side complexity and cost.

== History ==
=== Development and standardization ===
The Type 6 connector is based on the CHAdeMO ePTW (Electric Powered Two-Wheeler) specification, which was developed by the CHAdeMO Association to define a DC charging method covering voltages up to 120 V DC and currents up to 100 A DC. This specification was designed to support a spectrum of light electric vehicles including e-bikes, mopeds, scooters, motorcycles, delivery vehicles, tricycles, e-freight vehicles, e-rickshaws, and electric all-terrain vehicles.

The connector was internationally standardized as IEC 62196-6 and also adopted as Taiwan's TES-0D-01-01 standard. In India, the Bureau of Indian Standards (BIS) published the specification as IS 17017 (Part 2/Section 6):2021, establishing it as an official national standard for light electric vehicle DC charging.

The communication protocol IS 17017-25, which is derived from IEC 61851-25, was published to work in conjunction with the Type 6 connector, enabling interoperable charging infrastructure for light electric vehicles in India.

=== Bharat Charge Alliance ===
The Bharat Charge Alliance (BCA) was formed in 2024 to promote the Type 6 connector as the interoperable DC fast charging standard for light electric vehicles in India. The Alliance brings together leading companies in the EV charging infrastructure sector and vehicle manufacturers to establish a unified charging network.

Founding members and supporters include:

- Log9 – Advanced battery technology provider
- Trinity Cleantech (Thunder+ brand) – Sustainable energy solutions
- Tork Motors – Electric motorcycle manufacturer
- Altigreen – Electric three-wheeler manufacturer
- ETO Motors – Electric three-wheeler manufacturer
- Pulse Energy – Smart charging solutions provider
- ChargeZone (Billion Electric) – Charging network operator
- EVnnovator – Charging infrastructure provider
- Surja Automotive – Electric three-wheeler manufacturer

The Alliance aims to establish over 5,000 public charging stations across India, promoting Type 6 (IS 17017-2-6) DC fast chargers with interoperable charging under the LEV DC (IS 17017-25) standard and Unified Energy Interface (UEI) based payment mechanism powered by Beckn protocol.

The Automotive Research Association of India (ARAI), India's leading testing and certification agency, has built validation and testing capability for the IS 17017-2-6 connector and IS 17017-25 protocol.

== Technical specifications ==
=== Design ===
The Type 6 connector is a DC-only charging interface designed specifically for light electric vehicles. Unlike combined AC/DC systems, it focuses exclusively on DC fast charging, providing simplicity, reliability, and low cost as its primary advantages.

As specified by IS 17017, vehicles are fitted with a female vehicle inlet, whilst charging stations are fitted with a male connector, either directly on the charging station or via a flexible cable with permanently attached connector.

The Type 6 connector features mechanical and electromechanical latching systems on the charger connector side, with no latch mechanism required on the vehicle inlet side. This design enables vehicle manufacturers to adopt the connector with minimum investment and no architectural complexity, as the vehicle side requires only simple electronics on the vehicle control unit (VCU) and battery management system (BMS).

=== Power ratings ===
The Type 6 connector supports:

- DC voltage range: 20 V to 120 V DC
- DC current: 15 A to 125 A continuous
- Standard rating: Up to 100 A DC
- Extended rating: Up to 125 A for vehicles with larger battery packs
- Power output: 3 kW to 12 kW

At 10 kW charging power, a 10-minute charge session adds approximately 1.6 kWh of energy, providing roughly 40–50 km of range for a typical electric scooter.

=== Pin configuration ===
The Type 6 connector contains multiple contact pins for DC power delivery and communication:

- Proximity pilot (PP): Pre-insertion signaling
- Control pilot (CP): Post-insertion signaling and initial handshake
- Protective earth (PE): Full-current protective earthing system
- CAN High: Communication via CAN bus protocol
- CAN Low: Communication via CAN bus protocol
- DC+: Positive DC power pin
- DC-: Negative DC power pin

Communication takes place over the CAN bus (CAN High and CAN Low pins) for data exchange between the charger and vehicle after the initial control pilot (CP) handshake. The communication protocol follows IS 17017-25, derived from IEC 61851-25, which defines the digital communication requirements between the DC electric vehicle supply equipment (EVSE) and the electric vehicle.

The Type 6 connector uses a simple CAN bus protocol with a control pilot signal for safety, focusing on reliability without advanced features like Plug-and-Charge or vehicle-to-grid (V2G) capabilities.

== Adoption ==
=== Manufacturers ===
Several major electric vehicle manufacturers have adopted the Type 6 connector standard for their products:

==== Two-wheelers ====
- Ola Electric – Ola S1 Pro and other models in the S1 series
- Tork Motors – Tork Kratos R electric motorcycle
- Ultraviolette Automotive – Ultraviolette F77 performance electric motorcycle
- Simple Energy – Simple One electric scooter

==== Three-wheelers ====
- Altigreen – Electric three-wheelers (L5 category) with larger battery packs
- ETO Motors – Electric three-wheeler vehicles
- Surja Automotive – Electric three-wheeler manufacturer

The Type 6 connector is particularly popular among electric three-wheeler (L5 category) manufacturers, as it can support up to 125 A continuous charging current, suitable for vehicles with larger battery packs.

=== Infrastructure ===
As of 2026, charging infrastructure supporting the Type 6 connector is expanding rapidly across India:

- Ola Electric – Installed approximately 200 charging stations in more than 50 locations, with plans for rapid expansion
- Tork Motors – T-Net fast-charging network for electric motorcycles
- Ultraviolette – Provides boost charger as a portable charging accessory
- Trinity Cleantech (Thunder+) – Plans to set up 2,000 public charging stations across India
- Log9 Materials – Partnered with Trinity Cleantech to build interoperable charging network
- ChargeZone (Billion Electric) – Network of over 20 charging networks supporting Type 6
- Pulse Energy – Smart charging solutions provider
- EVQPoint Solutions – DC fast charging solutions with Type 6 support in 3 kW, 6 kW, and 10 kW variants
- Massive Mobility – Manufacturer of Type 6 compatible chargers in 3 kW, 6 kW, and 12 kW configurations

Many charging infrastructure operators offer dual-standard chargers supporting both Type 6 and Type 7 connectors to ensure maximum compatibility across different vehicle brands.

== Comparison with other standards ==
=== Type 7 connector ===
The Type 6 connector is often compared with the Type 7 connector (IS 17017) (also known as LECCS), which is another charging standard for light electric vehicles in India. Key differences include:

Feature	Type 6	Type 7
Charging type	DC only	Combined AC/DC
Maximum DC current	125 A	100 A
Maximum DC voltage	120 V	120 V
AC capability	No	Yes (up to 7.7 kW)
Latch location	Charger side	Vehicle side
Communication	CAN bus (IS 17017-25)	CAN bus (IS 17017-31)
Standard	IS 17017-2-6	IS 17017-2-7
Base technology	CHAdeMO ePTW	Ather proprietary
Integration complexity	Low (simple vehicle-side electronics)	Higher (requires AC/DC architecture)
International standard	IEC 62196-6, TES-0D-01-01	India-specific

Both standards are recognized under India's IS 17017 specifications and use CAN bus for communication after the initial control pilot handshake. Type 6 is primarily suited for dedicated DC fast charging applications with focus on simplicity and ease of integration, while Type 7 provides a unified solution for both AC and DC charging through a single port.

According to the Bharat Charge Alliance, the ease of integration and simplicity in transition are main factors favoring Type 6. The switch from existing connectors (such as SB 75 or other proprietary connectors) to Type 6 involves replacing the existing connector and making minor adjustments to hardware and software, such as adding a microcontroller to monitor charging. In comparison, Type 7 may require more significant changes to vehicle architecture, protocols, and wiring harnesses.

=== Bharat DC-001 ===
The Type 6 connector represents an evolution from India's earlier Bharat DC-001 standard, which was introduced under the FAME program in 2017. Bharat DC-001 was based on China's GB/T protocol and used a gun-style connector with two large DC pins and smaller communication pins. While Bharat DC-001 delivered up to 15 kW DC output (200 A at approximately 72 V maximum), it became limited as mainstream electric vehicles adopted higher-voltage systems.

The Type 6 connector addresses the needs of modern light electric vehicles with its wider voltage range (20-120 V), international standardization (IEC 62196-6), and focus on interoperability through the Bharat Charge Alliance.

=== Global standards ===
Unlike four-wheeler charging standards such as CCS, CHAdeMO, or GB/T, the Type 6 connector is specifically designed for the lighter weight, lower voltage requirements, and space constraints of two-wheelers and three-wheelers.

The Type 6 connector is based on the international CHAdeMO ePTW standard and is recognized as:

- IEC 62196-6 – International Electrotechnical Commission standard
- TES-0D-01-01 – Taiwan Electric Scooter standard
- IS 17017-2-6 – Indian standard

This multi-regional standardization provides Type 6 with broader international recognition compared to India-specific standards, facilitating potential adoption in other markets with similar light electric vehicle requirements.

== Interoperability and impact ==
=== Industry standardization ===
Before the introduction of Type 6 and Type 7 connectors, the Indian two-wheeler industry used over 10 different types of charging connectors, creating significant compatibility issues and limiting infrastructure development. The adoption of Type 6 as a common standard enables:

- Cross-brand charging compatibility – Vehicles from different manufacturers can use the same charging infrastructure
- Reduced infrastructure investment costs – Charging operators can deploy standardized equipment
- Improved user experience – Widespread charger availability without brand-specific restrictions
- Faster deployment of charging networks – Simplified equipment specifications and reduced inventory complexity
- Lower vehicle costs – Minimal vehicle-side complexity reduces manufacturing costs

=== Payment and authentication ===
The Bharat Charge Alliance promotes the use of Unified Energy Interface (UEI) based payment mechanism powered by Beckn protocol, enabling seamless payment across different charging networks. This approach allows users to authenticate and pay for charging services across multiple charging point operators (CPOs) using a single account or payment method.

=== Testing and certification ===
The Automotive Research Association of India (ARAI), India's leading testing and certification agency, has established comprehensive validation and testing capabilities for both the IS 17017-2-6 connector hardware and the IS 17017-25 communication protocol. This ensures that compliant products meet safety, performance, and interoperability requirements.

== See also ==
- IEC 62196
- Type 7 connector
- CHAdeMO
- Electric vehicle charging network
- Bureau of Indian Standards
- Automotive Research Association of India
- Combined Charging System
