= List of international prime ministerial trips made by Chris Hipkins =

This is a list of international prime ministerial trips made by Chris Hipkins, the 41st Prime Minister of New Zealand.

Prime Minister Chris Hipkins who took the office of Prime Minister of New Zealand on 25 January 2023 made his first prime ministerial trip to meet with his counter-part Prime Minister of Australia, Anthony Albanese on 7 February 2023 in Canberra, Australia.

== Summary ==
The number of visits per country where Prime Minister Hipkins traveled are:

- One: Belgium, China, Lithuania, Papua New Guinea, Sweden, United Kingdom
- Two: Australia

== 2023 ==
Country	Locations	Dates	Details
Australia	Canberra	7 February 2023	Hipkins met with Australian Prime Minister Anthony Albanese to continue on-going discussions on the economies of both Australia and New Zealand but also on their engagement within the Pacific and the wider Indo-Pacific Region.
Australia	Brisbane	22–23 April 2023	Hipkins met with Australian Prime Minister Anthony Albanese and led a trade delegation, marking 40 years of Closer Economic Relations between the two countries.
United Kingdom	London	3–7 May 2023	Hipkins attended the coronation of Charles III with Governor-General Cindy Kiro. Prior to the coronation, Hipkins met with Prince William at Windsor Castle, Charles III at Buckingham Palace and British Prime Minister Rishi Sunak.
Papua New Guinea	Port Moresby	22 May 2023	Hipkins attended a US-Pacific Summit and held bilateral meetings with Cook Islands Prime Minister Mark Brown, US Secretary of State Antony Blinken and Indian Prime Minister Narendra Modi.
China	Beijing, Tianjin, Shanghai	25–30 June 2023	Hipkins led a trade delegation and met with Chinese President Xi Jinping and Premier Li Qiang.
Belgium	Brussels	9 July 2023	Hipkins met with European Commission President Ursula von der Leyen to sign a free trade agreement.
Sweden	Stockholm	10 July 2023	Hipkins discussed free trade with Swedish Prime Minister Ulf Kristersson.
Lithuania	Vilnius	11–13 July 2023	Hipkins attended the 2023 NATO summit.

== Multilateral meetings ==
Prime Minister Hipkins attended the following summits during his prime ministership.

Group	Year
Group	2023
UNGA	23 September,(*) (United States) New York City
APEC	15–17 November,(***) (United States) San Francisco
EAS (ASEAN)	6–7 September,(*) (Indonesia) Jakarta
CHOGM	5–6 May, (United Kingdom) London
PIF	6–10 November,(**) (Cook Islands) Rarotonga
NATO	11–12 July, (Lithuania) Vilnius
Others	Korea–Pacific Islands Summit; 29–30 May,(*) (South Korea) Seoul
██ = Attended by Foreign Affairs Minister Nanaia Mahuta (*), Deputy Prime Minister Carmel Sepuloni and Foreign Affairs Spokesperson Gerry Brownlee (**), Trade Minister Damien O'Connor (***)

== See also ==
- Sixth Labour Government of New Zealand
- Cabinet of New Zealand
- Foreign relations of New Zealand
- List of international prime ministerial trips made by Jacinda Ardern, his predecessor
- List of international prime ministerial trips made by Christopher Luxon, his successor
