= Plug-in electric vehicles in India =

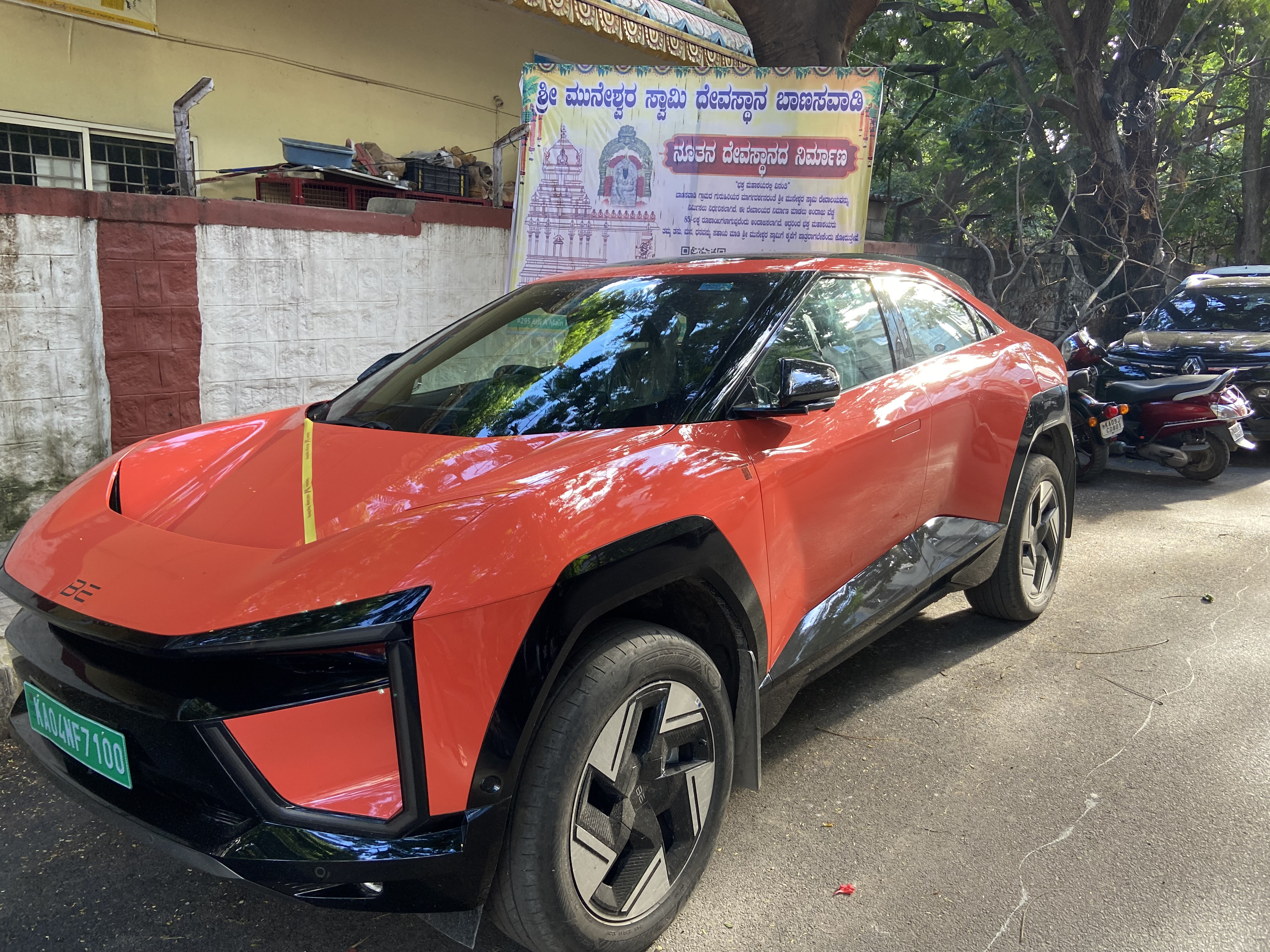
Mahindra BE 6 EV

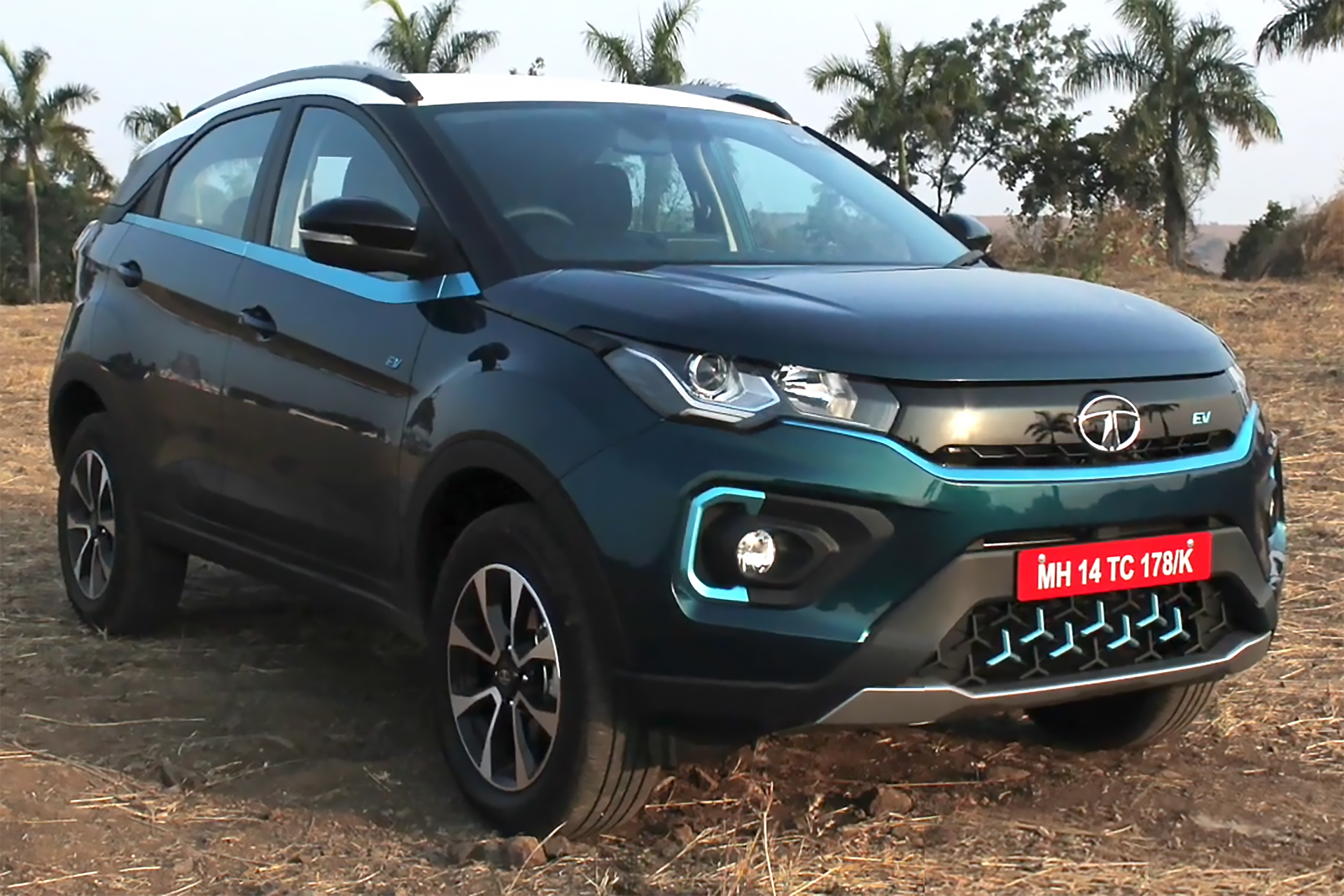
TATA Nexon EV

The electric vehicle industry in India is slowly growing. The central and state governments have implemented schemes and incentives to promote electric mobility, and have introduced regulations and standards.

In 2015, the Department of Heavy Industry (DHI) launched FAME, or Faster Adoption and Manufacturing of (Hybrid and) Electric vehicles, which is currently India's flagship scheme for promoting electric mobility,

Although India would benefit from converting its transport from internal combustion (IC) engines to electric motors, challenges include a lack of charging infrastructure, high initial cost and a lack of renewable energy. E-commerce companies, car manufacturers, app-based transport network companies and mobility-solution providers have entered the sector, however, they are slowly building electric-car capacity and visibility.

== Standards ==
=== Charging ===
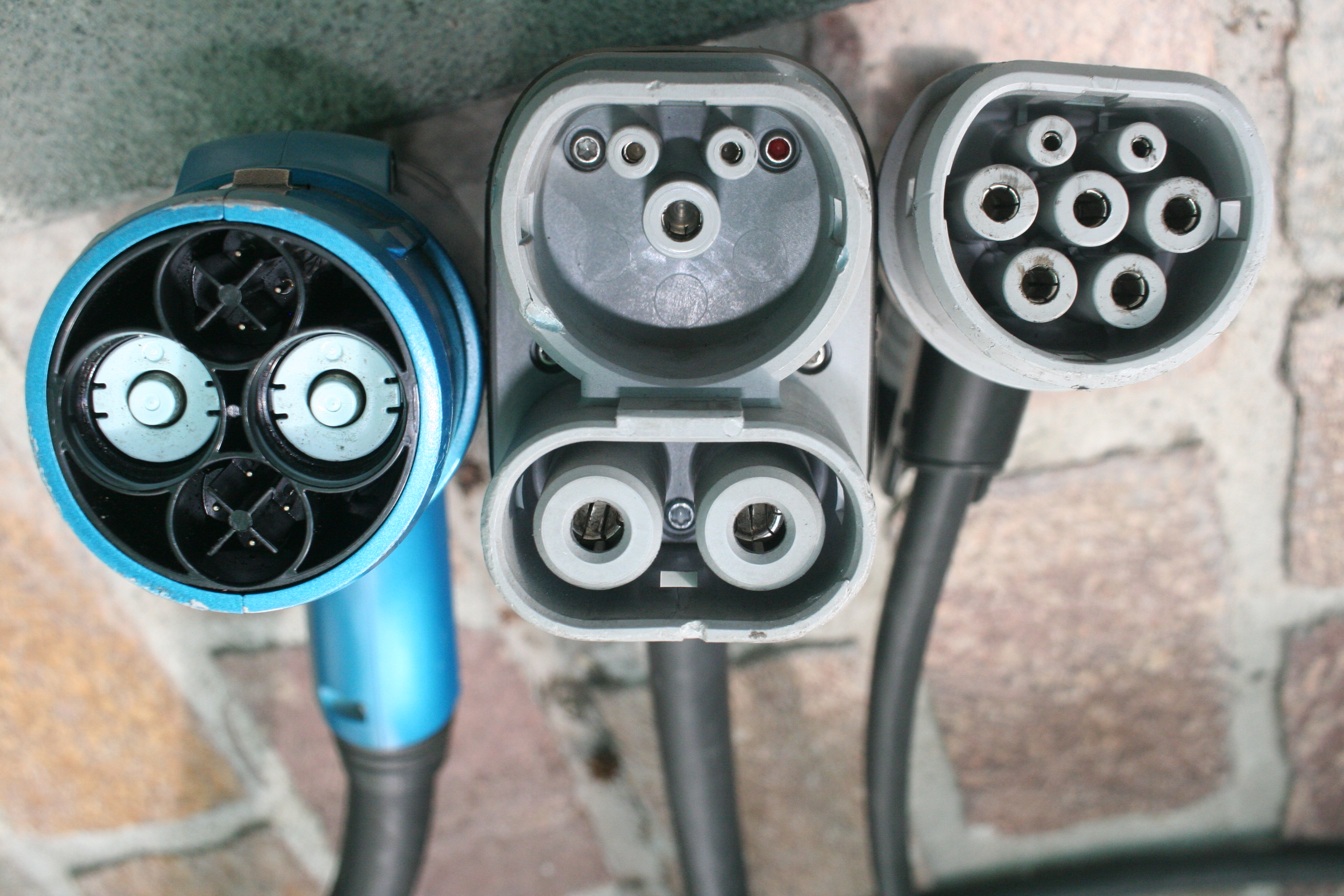
From left to right: CHAdeMO (IEC 62196-3 configuration AA, DC), Combo2 (IEC 62196-3 configuration FF, DC), and Type 2 (IEC 62196–2, AC). A common socket can be used for Type 2 (AC) and Combo 2 (DC).

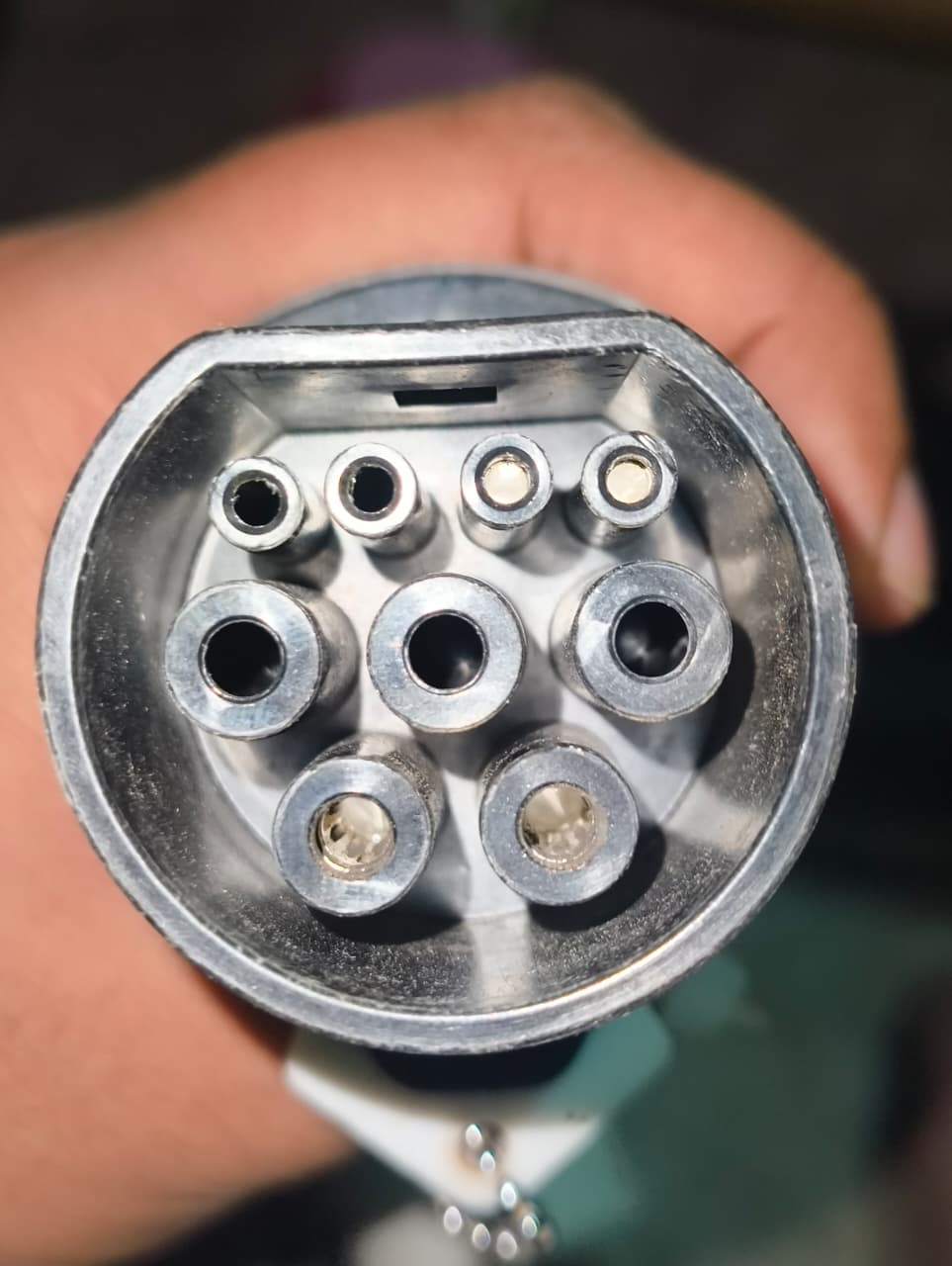
IS 17017 Type 7 connector developed by Ather Energy

Electric vehicle standards and specifications
Charging station		Maximum			Supported	
Level	Type	Voltage (V)	Current (A)	Power (kW)	Vehicles	Connector(s) (preferred)
1	AC	240	16	3.5	Light EV; 4w, 3w, 2w	Type 1, Bharat AC-001
1	DC	48–120	100	15	Light EV; 4w, 3w, 2w	Bharat DC-001
2	AC	380–400	63 (3φ) / 70 (1φ)	22	4w, 3w, 2w	Type 1, Type 2, GB/T, Bharat AC-001
3	AC	200–1000		4.3–22	Cars and SUVs; 4w	Type 2
4	DC	200–1000		400	Cars and SUVs; 4w	Type 2, CHAdeMO, CCS1, CCS2

Indian Standard 17017 (IS 17017) is the governing standard in India, with parts and sections largely compatible with IEC 61851 and IEC 62196:

- Part 1 has basic features and general requirements
- Part 2 has connector standards:
  - Part 2 § 1 is adapted from IEC 62196-1
  - Part 2 § 2 is adapted from IEC 62196-2 for India
  - Part 2 § 3 is adapted from IEC 62196-3
- Part 3 is adapted from IEC 61851-3 for light EVs
- Part 21, adapted from IEC 61851-21, has electromagnetic compatibility standards for charging units
- Part 23, adapted from IEC 61851-23, has requirements for DC EVSEs
- Part 24, adapted from IEC 61851-24, has communication requirements for DC EVSEs

Charging stations in India are classified as distributed or high-power, depending on the maximum power which can be supplied. Within these classifications are distinctions based on the current (alternating or direct current) and intended use:

Charging infrastructure
Type	Power (kW)	Level	Connector standard	Notes
Distributed charge points
AC Light EV	7	1	IS-60309	Includes low-cost AC charge points with a maximum of 3 kW using 220 VAC / 15 A supply line, target price ₹3,500 for two- and three-wheeled light vehicles
DC Light EV	7	1	IS-17017-2-6	Unique to India due to use of low-voltage (≤120V) traction batteries
AC Parkbay	11 (max 22)	2	IS-17017-2-2	
DC Parkbay	11 (max 22)	2	IS-17017-2-3	
High-power charge points
DC	50–250	3	IS-17017-2-3	
Dual-gun	250–500	4	IS-17017-2-3	Uses dual CCS2 connectors
Automated pantograph	250–500	4	IS-17017-3-2	Based on SAE J3105-1

==== AC ====
IS:17017 specifies Bharat EV Charging standard AC001 for Level 1. It uses 15A, 230V, 3.3 kW, and an IEC 60309 connector. Electric vehicles can be charged with a regular 220V – 15A household supply that delivers about 2.5 kW of power. There is no policy or standard for at-home EV charging. Bharat EV specifications recommend the installation of a residual current circuit breaker to ensure safety and use of an IEC 60309 industrial connector, but a three-pin 15A plug could also be used. For higher power AC charging (Levels 2 and 3, ~22 kW), Type 2 connectors are specified. The advantage of Type 2 connectors is their ability to use three-phase electric power.

==== DC ====
The public DC charging standard is DC 001 for Level 1, using custom GB/T for EV-EVSE communication over a CAN bus. It uses 200A, 15 kW, and a GB/T 20234.3 connector. Maximum DC output voltage is 100V. Cars using this standard include the Mahindra e-Varito, Mahindra e20 and Tata Motors e-Tigor.

IS:17017-1, published by the BIS in August 2018, recommends CCS-2 (Combined Charging System Combo 2) and CHAdeMO protocols for high-power Level 4 fast charging. The advantage of CCS over CHAdeMO and GB/T is that it uses power-line communication (PLC) for EV-EVSE communication; CHAdeMO and GB/T use CAN. PLC allows secure, encrypted communications, and the link can support a higher data rate than CAN.

=== Electric Vehicle Supply Equipment (EVSE) ===
The IS:17017 standard published by the Bureau of Indian Standards (BIS) covers general requirements and safety norms for EVSEs.

=== Central Management System (CMS) ===
The Open Charge Point Protocol (OCPP) 1.5 or higher over the internet is required.

== Charging stations ==
The Indian government has defined public charging stations and EV charging businesses as de-licensed activities. It has been specified that each 3-by-3-kilometre (1.9 by 1.9 mi) area in cities must have at least one charging station, and one station every 25 kilometres (16 mi) on both sides of highways. These guidelines were mandated in cities with populations of over four million and all expressways and major highways connecting those cities by 2022. The second phase (three to five years) will focus on large cities, such as state capitals and Union Territory headquarters. Plugin India is an initiative to facilitate community charging stations, and solar-powered charging points at fuel stations are planned. Companies such as Tata Power, Fortum and Joulepoint are part of the electric-vehicle-charging sector. They have installed a variety of chargers, including rapid DC chargers and level 2 AC chargers, for applications such as public access, workplace charging, fleet charging, residential communities, malls, and highways.

The development of public charging infrastructure, particularly level 2 charging, is expected to be the greatest challenge to service integration. Standard charging time is six to eight hours, and cost and lack of renewable energy are issues for fast DC charging. Ten percent of the required charging infrastructure is expected to consist of fast-charging stations, and the remainder will be Level 2 public charging stations. Ather Energy introduced Ather Grid, its charging infrastructure service, on 22 May 2018 in Bangalore; each charging station is known as a point. The service, available for all electric vehicles, has been deployed where Ather plans to introduce its electric scooter.

== Government policies ==
=== Union ===
Reiterating its commitment to the Paris Agreement, the government of India plans to make a major shift to electric vehicles by 2030. It outlined a two-pronged strategy for buyers and manufacturers, offering $1.4 billion in subsidies to buyers and increasing import tariffs to encourage the manufacture of electric vehicles by domestic companies. The government is focusing on electrifying public transportation with subsidies, primarily for two-wheelers, three-wheelers, and buses. It also earmarks $140 million for the development of charging infrastructure. On 14 December 2018, the government released an outline of standards and guidelines for EV charging infrastructure. In addition to specifications for charging infrastructure, the guidelines require a charging station for every 25 kilometres (16 mi) of road or highway. Energy Efficiency Services Limited (EESL) is obtaining 10,000 electric vehicles for rent or sale to government departments.

==== National Electric Mobility Mission Plan, 2020 (NEMMP) ====
This plan was introduced by the government of India in 2012 to increase national fuel security through the promotion of hybrid and electric vehicles. India's auto industry contributes 22 percent to manufacturing GDP, a percentage expected to increase to 25 percent by 2022 with the new manufacturing policy. The NEMMP aims for 30-percent EV penetration in India by 2030.

==== Faster Adoption and Manufacturing of Hybrid and Electric vehicles (FAME) ====
The government began a Faster Adoption and Manufacturing of Hybrid and Electric vehicles (FAME) scheme, which provides incentives for purchasing electric vehicles. Phase I of the scheme was from 2015 to 2019; Phase II began in 2019, and was planned for completion in 2022.

The government is releasing tenders to increase charging infrastructure nationwide. The scheme offers incentives for electric and hybrid vehicles ranging from ₹1,800 to ₹29,000 for scooters and motorcycles and ₹1.38 lakh for cars. FAME is a part of the National Electric Mobility Mission Plan.

==== Go Electric campaign ====
The government introduced its Go Electric campaign in early 2021 to encourage the adoption of electric mobility vehicles and electric cooking appliances and to ensure energy security. Road Transport and Highways Minister Nitin Gadkari launched the campaign, saying that Go Electric is the future for India and will promote low-cost, environmentally friendly, indigenous electrical products. Gadkari expressed concern about the cost of importing fossil fuels, and called CO_{2} emissions from transportation vehicles a major challenge. The country must encourage the use of vehicles using alternative fuels such as electric batteries, compressed natural gas and biofuels. The government waived registration fees for EVs, and urged the states to give tax breaks.

=== Delhi ===
In 2019 the Delhi government approved 1,000 low-floor AC electric buses to be used in the union territory's public-transport system. The buses have CCTV, an automatic vehicle tracking system (AVTS), panic buttons and panic alarms. The government subsidy is ₹75 lakh or 60 percent of the cost of the bus, whichever is less. By, Delhi had 249 electric buses on the road. The Delhi-based startup Park+ plans to set up 10,000 chargers by 2024 in the Delhi NCR. Delhi Transport Minister Kailash Gahlot tweeted that the Delhi government would continue its EV policy in 2023.

=== Tamil Nadu ===
Tamil Nadu chief minister Edappadi K. Palaniswami introduced Mauto Electric Mobility's electric auto rickshaws, reportedly India's first retrofitted electric autos, in 2019. The Dubai-based KMC Group and Mauto Electric Mobility will convert petrol-powered auto rickshaws into electric vehicles with an investment of ₹100 crore and create 5,000 jobs. The companies signed a memorandum of understanding (MOU) during Palaniswami's September 2019 stopover in Dubai during his three-nation trip.

"The driving range per full charge of three hours will be 100 kilometres (62 mi). The aim is to introduce 4,000 electric rickshaws in the city, 100 per month, to reduce air pollution to a large extent. The autos are fitted with CCTV surveillance, a panic button and a television. It is highly safe for children going to school and women", said Mansoor Ali Khan, chair of the Mauto group of companies. Mansoor, chief executive officer of the MAuto Group, said that petrol-driven auto rickshaws cost ₹350–₹400 per 100 km, and their electric counterparts cost ₹40. "The retrofitting of auto rickshaws will cost only ₹1.2 to ₹1.5 lakh. We are ready to convert vehicles registered after 2000", he added. The company is planning to set up charging stations in each of Chennai's ten zones. Charging on the go will be possible with a mobile app.

=== Odisha ===
The Odisha government introduced its Electric Vehicle Policy 2021, effective from 1 September 2021, aiming for 20% adoption of battery electric vehicles (BEVs) among all new vehicle registrations by 2025.

The policy provides subsidies to promote EV purchases:

- ₹5,000 for two-wheelers (later enhanced up to ₹20,000 depending on battery capacity).
- Up to ₹12,000 for three-wheelers.
- Up to ₹1,00,000 for four-wheelers.

Buyers are also exempted from motor vehicle tax and registration fees on EVs registered in the state until 31 December 2025. In addition, government employees are eligible for interest-free advances for buying EVs.

To boost EV adoption, the government announced support for manufacturing units, charging stations, and retrofitting of vehicles. By 2025, Odisha had set up over 500 charging stations and is planning expansion with battery swapping and fast-charging facilities, including at fuel pumps and bus terminals.

In 2025, the state unveiled a draft EV Policy 2.0, targeting 50% adoption of EVs by 2036. The new policy proposes higher subsidies (up to ₹30,000 for two-wheelers and ₹20 lakh for buses/trucks), incentives for retrofitted EVs, and mandates converting government-owned vehicles, school buses, and ambulances into EVs within a fixed timeline.

=== Karnataka ===
Karnataka government approved the Electric Vehicle and Energy Storage Policy 2017, which aims to attract an investment of ₹310 billion and create about 55,000 jobs. The union government has announced its vision to make India an all-electric-vehicle market by 2031 to reduce the country's dependence on fossil fuels and reduce its carbon footprint.

=== Maharashtra ===
The Maharashtra government is focusing on increasing EV use in the state by proposing an EV road-tax exemption and a 15-percent subsidy for the first 10,000 EVs registered in the state. To improve infrastructure, the government proposed a maximum subsidy of ₹1 million (~$15,549) per charging station for the first 250 stations set up in the state.

=== Uttar Pradesh ===
Uttar Pradesh is actively advancing its electric vehicle (EV) industry through strategic policies and substantial investments. The state's "Electric Vehicle Manufacturing and Mobility Policy 2022" aims to transition the transportation sector towards electric mobility and establish UP as a manufacturing hub for EVs and ancillary equipment.

Under this policy, the UP government offers subsidies to encourage EV adoption: ₹5,000 for two-wheelers (based on battery capacity, typically ₹5,000 per kWh up to a limit), up to ₹12,000 for three-wheelers, and up to ₹1 lakh for electric cars. These incentives are generally available for a limited number of vehicles and within a specified time frame under the policy. Additionally, the policy provides a 100% waiver on road tax and registration fees for EVs purchased within the state for a defined period. The policy may also include incentives for manufacturers, charging infrastructure development, and potential scrappage benefits for old vehicles (subject to conditions).

In terms of market share, Uttar Pradesh leads the nation, accounting for over 14% of India's EV market in 2023. The state has dominated the three-wheeler segment, with more than 40% of electric three-wheelers in the country. In the fourth quarter of FY 2023-24, UP recorded approximately 83,154 EV sales, representing 16.07% of India's total EV sales.

To support the growing number of EVs, the state is expanding its charging infrastructure. Under the FAME II scheme, 207 charging stations are being installed in nine cities of the state: Noida, Lucknow, Varanasi, Prayagraj, Kanpur, Aligarh, Saharanpur, Bareilly, and Jhansi.

Furthermore, the UP government has identified over 2,000 acres of land in various industrial areas for the development of EV manufacturing units, aiming to attract investments and generate employment. The policy also targets the rollout of 1 million EVs across segments by December 2024 and the deployment of 1,000 electric buses by December 2030.

=== Uttarakhand ===
In 2018, the Uttarakhand government introduced a scheme to promote the manufacture and use of EVs. The scheme would provide companies with loans ranging between ₹100 million and ₹500 million to build EVs and charging infrastructure, and would exempt the first 10,000 EV purchasers from motor tax for five years.

=== Gujarat ===
The Gujarat government is committed to reducing its carbon footprint by 600,000 tons per year by decreasing pollution from the burning of fossil fuels. EV purchasers are eligible for subsidies of up to ₹20,000 for two-wheelers, ₹50,000 for three-wheelers, and ₹150,000 for four-wheelers. Capital for infrastructure is being offered to set up charging stations in the state; 280 charging stations were set up across Gujarat after the EV policy was announced, and 250 more are planned.

== Advantages ==
Electric vehicles are three to five times more efficient than internal-combustion vehicles in utilising energy. If electric vehicles run on electricity produced from fossil fuels, their overall efficiency remains higher and their pollution is less; large thermal power plants are more efficient than IC engines, and it is easier to control emissions from power plants than from vehicle engines. Electric vehicles save energy by regenerative braking. Thirty to seventy percent of the energy used for propulsion can be recovered, with higher percentages in stop-and-go city driving.

Air-quality indices in India show that the air in many cities is no longer healthy, with automobile-related pollution a cause. Climate change requires a shift to automotive solutions which reduce or eliminate greenhouse gas emissions. If electric vehicles run on electricity produced from non-polluting sources of energy such as hydro, solar, wind, tidal and nuclear, their emissions are reduced almost to zero. India's crude-oil imports for 2014–15 were US$112 billion (about ₹7 trillion). For comparison, the allocation for the Mahatma Gandhi National Rural Employment Guarantee Scheme in the 2017–18 budget was ₹480 billion. India can become a global provider for sustainable transport and processes which are affordable and scalable. Residents of some Indian cities are affected by noise pollution; some Indian cities have the world's highest noise-pollution levels. Electric vehicles are quieter, and may help reduce urban noise pollution.

Energy efficiency and emission reduction have improved in automobiles, but the increase in the number of vehicles on the road negates these gains; energy-efficiency and pollution-control measures did not keep pace with sales growth. The total number of vehicles registered in India was 5.4 million in 1981, 11 million in 1986, 33 million in 1996, 40 million in 2000 and 210 million in 2015. The total number of vehicles sold in India increased from 15,481,381 in 2010–11 to 20,469,385 in 2015–16.

With smart charging, electric vehicles can help balance supply variations in the electricity grid and provide a buffer against electricity-supply failures. Electric vehicles have fewer moving parts than vehicles with IC engines, and are cheaper and easier to maintain. Electric motors can deliver high torque at low speeds, performing better in acceleration and on slopes than IC-engine-powered vehicles.

== Disadvantages ==
The cost of EVs is high, primarily due to the cost of lithium-ion batteries. The battery packs are imported, and cost about $275/KWh in India. This, combined with the GST of 18% and the lack of lithium in India, further increases the cost of batteries. The charging infrastructure for electric vehicles in India has not been fully developed. Electricity in India is primarily produced by burning coal, which produces a large amount of greenhouse emissions. With the introduction of EVs and charging infrastructure, electricity demand will increase; introducing EVs to reduce GHG emissions would be ineffective if the electricity was produced by burning coal. India's indebted distribution companies cannot meet the country's energy requirements as it is. Fast charging stations are charging nearly Rs 25 per kWh to cover the investment and running costs which would not offer any benefit over ICE vehicles in terms of life cycle cost of the vehicle except surface air pollution reduction.

== See also ==
- Automotive industry in India
- Energy efficiency in transport
- List of prototype solar-powered cars
- List of vehicle plants in India
- Solar car
- Solar vehicle
- Vehicular metrics
- Oil and gas industry in India
