= Carbon Neutrality Coalition =

International environment organization

- Formation: 12 December 2017; 8 years ago:
- Type: International environmental organization
- Region served: Worldwide
- Members: www.carbon-neutrality.global/members/
- Website: www.carbon-neutrality.global

The Carbon Neutrality Coalition (CNC) is a group of countries, cities and organisations which have committed to take concrete and ambitious action to achieve the aims of the Paris Agreement.

== History ==
The Carbon Neutrality Coalition (CNC) was founded in 2017 by 16 countries and 32 cities, inspired by Bhutan. In December, New Zealand Climate Change Minister James Shaw said "The Coalition is a perfect fit with our goal of becoming a net zero emission economy by 2050"

In September 2018 the Coalition held its first meeting at the UN General Assembly and 4 new countries joined: the UK; Canada; Denmark and Spain.

In September 2019 at the UN Climate Summit, it was announced that 5 new countries were joining the coalition: Austria, Chile, Italy, Japan and Timor-Leste.

== Benefits ==
The coalition aims to achieve benefits in 3 key areas:

- Socioeconomic benefits
- Climate-resilient economies
- Accelerating global climate action

== Plan of Action ==
Coalition members agree to

- Develop and share their de-carbonisation strategies, experiences, data and tools before 2020
- Promote increased ambition from all countries globally on reducing emissions

== Criticism ==
In July 2019 a World Economic Forum blog said a number of member nations haven't made any substantial carbon neutrality steps.

== Members ==
The country members of the Carbon Neutrality Coalition are:

- Austria
- Canada
- Chile
- Costa Rica
- Colombia
- Denmark
- Ethiopia
- Fiji
- Finland
- France
- Germany
- Iceland
- Ireland
- Italy
- Japan
- Luxembourg
- Marshall Islands
- Mexico
- Monaco
- the Netherlands
- New Zealand
- Norway
- Portugal
- South Korea
- Spain
- Sweden
- Switzerland
- Timor-Leste
- United Kingdom
