= Magiagi Tai =

Coordinates: 13°50′59″S 171°45′11.97″W

Magiagi is a village on the island of Upolu in Samoa. It is situated on the central north coast of the island. The village is in the political district of Tuamasaga.

The population was 1,822 at the 2021 census, with a split by gender of 893 male and 929 female.
