= Carbon Neutral Cities Alliance =

Green energy alliance

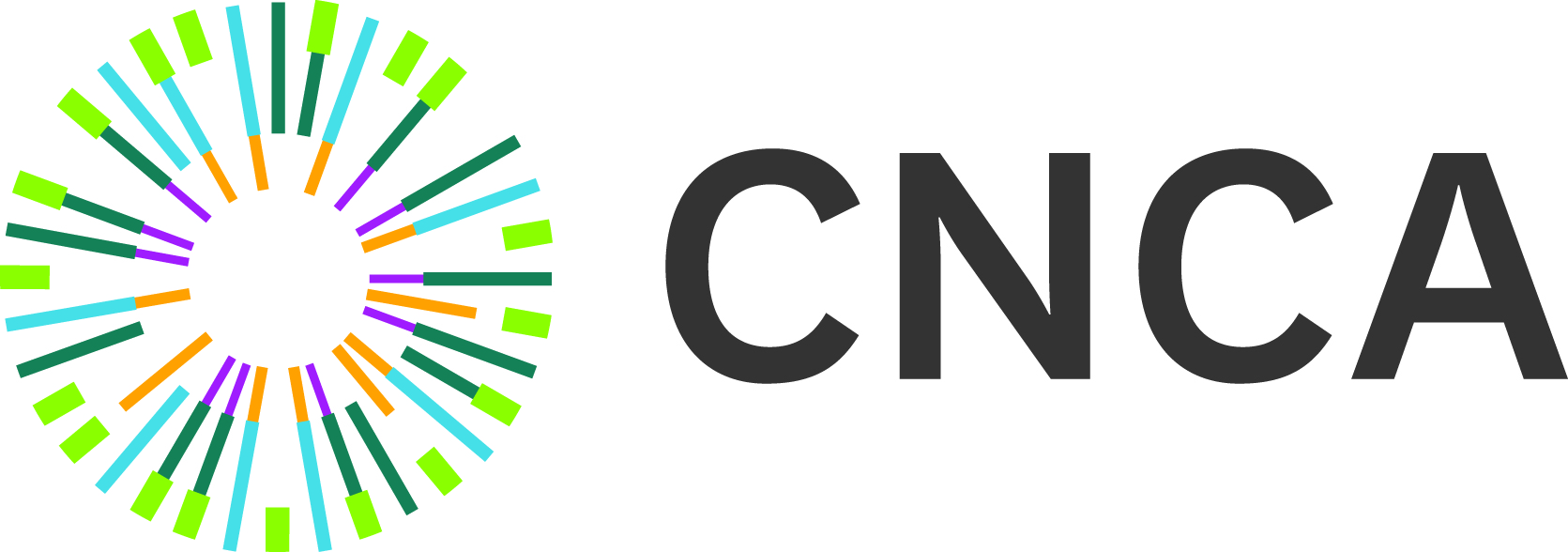
- Logo
- Founded: June 2014 Copenhagen, Denmark
- Type: International organization
- Focus: Deep carbon reductions, climate change
- Area served: Cities
- Method: Peer-to-peer exchange, research, communication products, innovation fund
- Website: carbonneutralcitiesalliance.org

The Carbon Neutral Cities Alliance (CNCA or “Alliance”) is a collaboration of leading global cities working to cut greenhouse gas emissions by 80% or more by 2050 or sooner (“80x50”) — the most aggressive greenhouse gas reduction targets undertaken by any cities across the globe. The Alliance aims to address what it will take for leading international cities to achieve these deep emissions reductions and how they can work together to meet their respective goals more efficiently and effectively.

== Background ==
The Alliance was born in Copenhagen in June 2014 at an organizing meeting of the following 17 cities:

- Berlin, Germany
- Boulder CO, USA
- Boston MA, USA
- Copenhagen, Denmark
- London, United Kingdom
- Melbourne, Australia
- Minneapolis MN, USA
- New York City NY, USA
- Oslo, Norway
- Portland OR, USA
- San Francisco CA, USA
- Seattle WA, USA
- Stockholm, Sweden
- Sydney, Australia
- Vancouver BC, Canada
- Washington DC, USA
- Yokohama, Japan

Founding cities came together to share lessons in planning for and implementing deep carbon reductions and agreed upon opportunities to accelerate best practices through collaboration in the Alliance's first year, including:

- Developing Carbon neutrality Planning Standards – Developing approaches, analysis, and tools to support carbon neutrality; standardizing measurement and verification methodologies for tracking progress.
- Advancing “Transformative Change” in Key Urban Sectors – Sharing and implementing best practices for achieving “transformative” deep carbon reduction strategies in urban transportation, energy use, and waste systems.
- Advocating for Policy Change – Identifying and advocating for policies at the state, regional, and federal levels to reduce emission sources not controlled directly by cities and engaging with other external stakeholders who are critical to cities’ success.
- Speaking with a Common Voice – Helping CNCA cities demonstrate their leadership and communicate with a common voice.
- Creating a CNCA “Innovation Fund” – Investing in high-potential, city-led projects that develop, test, implement, and amplify deep de-carbonization strategies and practices (currently funded at $500,000).
- Increasing Alliance Impact – Sharing Alliance learnings with a broader audience to benefit the “next wave” of cities striving for carbon neutrality.

== Staff, partners and funding ==
The Alliance is staffed by the Urban Sustainability Directors Network (USDN) in partnership with the Innovation Network for Communities (INC) and C40 Cities Climate Leadership Group (C40), and is supported by The Kresge Foundation, Barr Foundation, Summit Foundation, Rockefeller Brothers Fund, V. Kann Rasmussen Foundation, MacArthur Foundation, and Bullitt Foundation.
