= Type 7 connector =

Indian standard for charging light electric vehicles

Type 7 connector (LECCS)
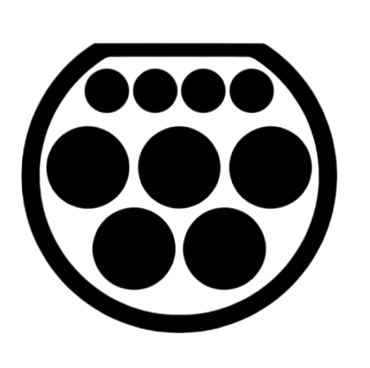

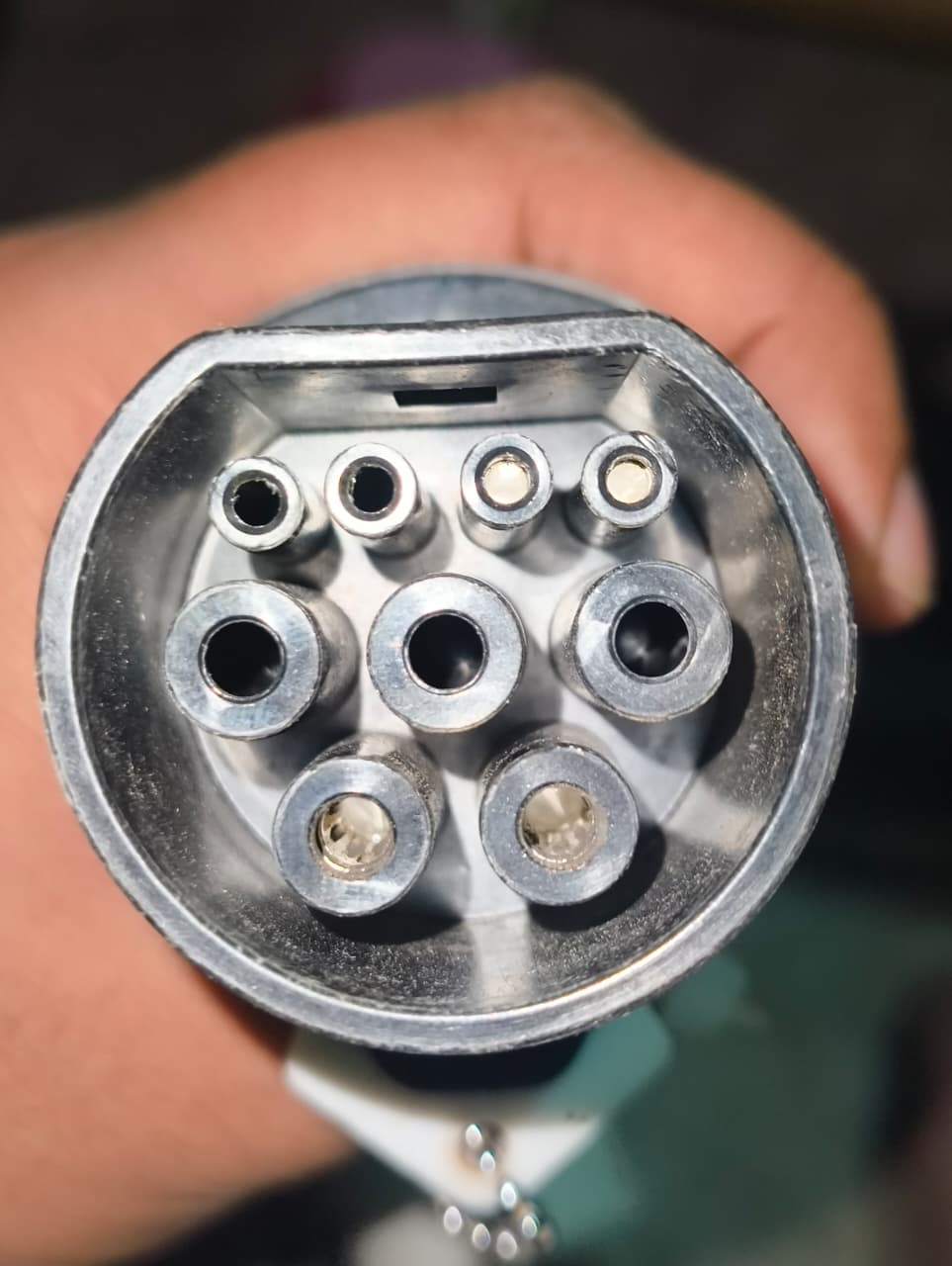
- Type: Electric vehicle charging

Production history
- Designer: Ather Energy
- Designed: 2020
- Manufacturer: Multiple
- Produced: 2021–present

General specifications
- External: yes
- Pins: 9 (1 earth, 1 line phases, 1 neutral, 1 CP , 1 PP, 1 CAN+ , 1 CAN−, 1 DC+ , 1 DC−)

Electrical
- Earth: yes
- Max. voltage: 240 V AC / 120 V DC
- Max. current: 32 A AC / 100 A DC

Pinout
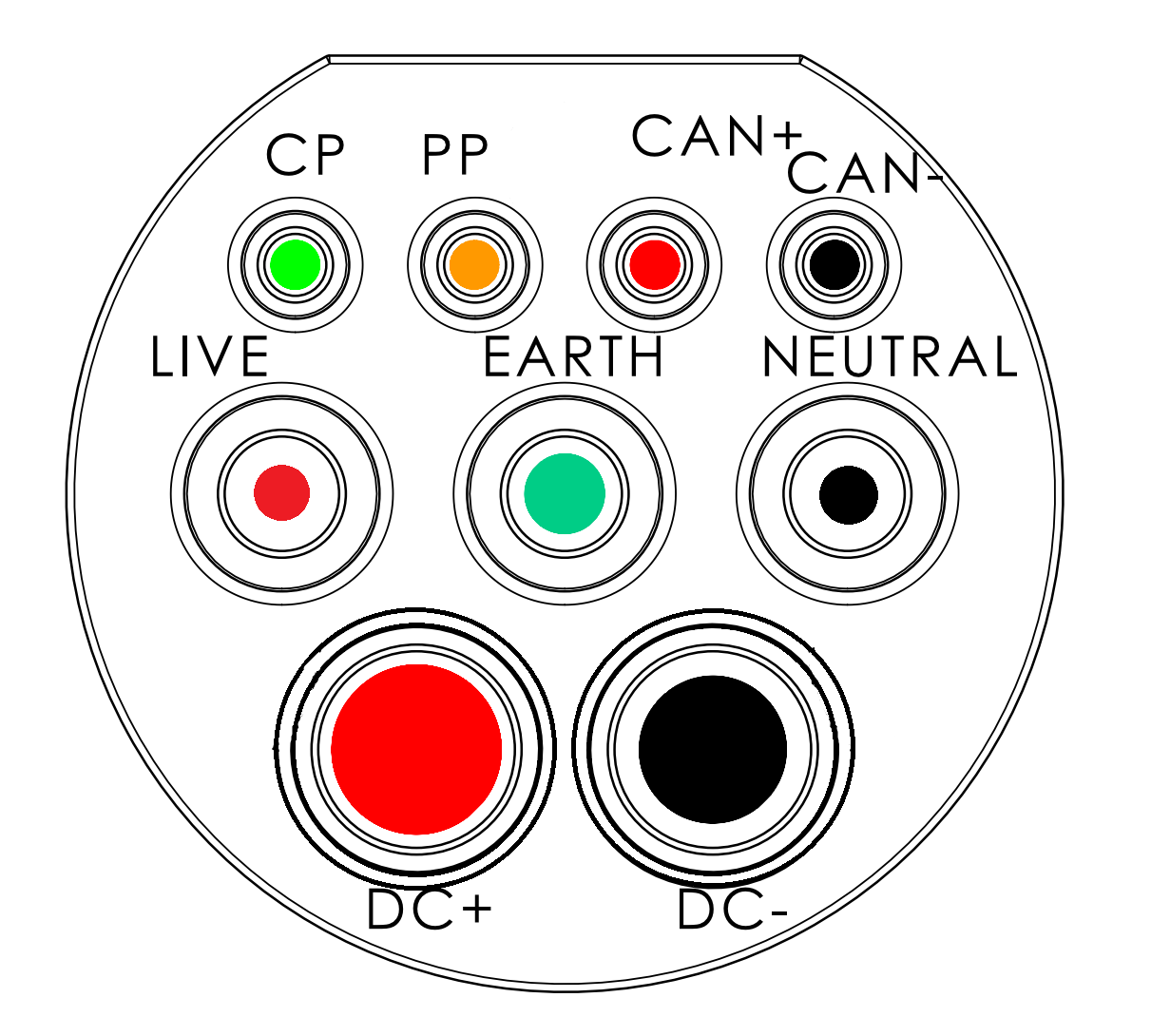
- Pinout for Type 7 plug
CP	Control pilot	post-insertion signalling
PP	Proximity pilot	pre-insertion signalling
CAN+	CAN High	Communication N1 (+)
CAN−	CAN Low	Communication 1 (−)
LIVE	Live	single-phase AC (220-240V 50hz)
EARTH	Earth	Protective earth
NEUTRAL	Neutral	Single-phase AC (220-240V 50hz)
DC+ / DC−	DC+ / DC−	Single-phase DC Positive/Negative
- Pin details of Type 7 (IS17017-2-7) connectors

The IS 17017 Type 7 connector (often referred to as LECCS for Light Electric Combined Charging System) is used for charging electric two-wheelers and electric three-wheelers, mainly within India, as it is one of two DC plug standards described in IS 17017-2. The Type 7 connector is a combined alternating current (AC) and direct current (DC) charging system. It has since been formally approved by the Bureau of Indian Standards (BIS) and published as Indian Standard IS 17017 (Part 2/Section 7):2023. The Type 6 connector (IS 17017) (also known as LEVDC) is the corresponding DC-only connector standard used in India for light electric vehicles.

Type 7 connectors are derived from the need to provide a unified charging interface that handles both AC and DC charging through a single port. The battery management system on the electric vehicle negotiates the maximum current with the electric vehicle supply equipment via dedicated pins in the Type 7 connector using CAN bus communication. The Type 7 connectors support both AC charging (up to 7.7 kW) and DC fast charging (up to 12 kW). Type 7 connectors feature an energized latch on the vehicle-side inlet for secure connection, distinguishing them from Type 6 connectors which use mechanical latches on the charger side.

== History ==
In 2020, Ather Energy began development of a combined charging interface specifically for electric two-wheelers, in collaboration with various government bodies and industry stakeholders, including NITI Aayog, the Department of Science and Technology, the Automotive Research Association of India (ARAI), EV manufacturers, and the Bureau of Indian Standards (BIS). The development aimed to address the fragmentation in India's two-wheeler charging infrastructure, where over 10 different connector types were being used by various manufacturers.

In 2021, Ather Energy open-sourced its fast-charging connector technology, making the intellectual property (IP) freely available to other manufacturers and charging infrastructure operators. This strategic decision was made to create an interoperable charging ecosystem and encourage industry-wide adoption.

In October 2023, the LECCS connector received formal approval from the Bureau of Indian Standards (BIS) and was published as Indian Standard IS 17017 (Part 2/Section 7):2023. An additional specification, IS 17017 – Part 31:2024, was published in February 2024. This standardization made the Type 7 connector an officially recognized charging standard in India for light electric vehicles.

== Technical specifications ==
=== Design ===
The Type 7 connector integrates both AC and DC charging capabilities into a single, unified interface, distinguishing it from other charging connectors that require separate ports for AC and DC charging. The connector is compact and lightweight, making it suitable for the form factor constraints of two-wheelers and three-wheelers.

As specified by IS 17017, vehicles are fitted with a female vehicle inlet, whilst charging stations are fitted with a male connector, either directly on the outside of the charging station, or via a flexible cable with permanently attached connector on the end.

The Type 7 connector features an energized latching system on the vehicle-side inlet to secure the connection during charging. Unlike Type 6 connectors where the locking mechanism is on the charger side, the Type 7 system places this functionality on the vehicle side, providing a different approach to connection security.

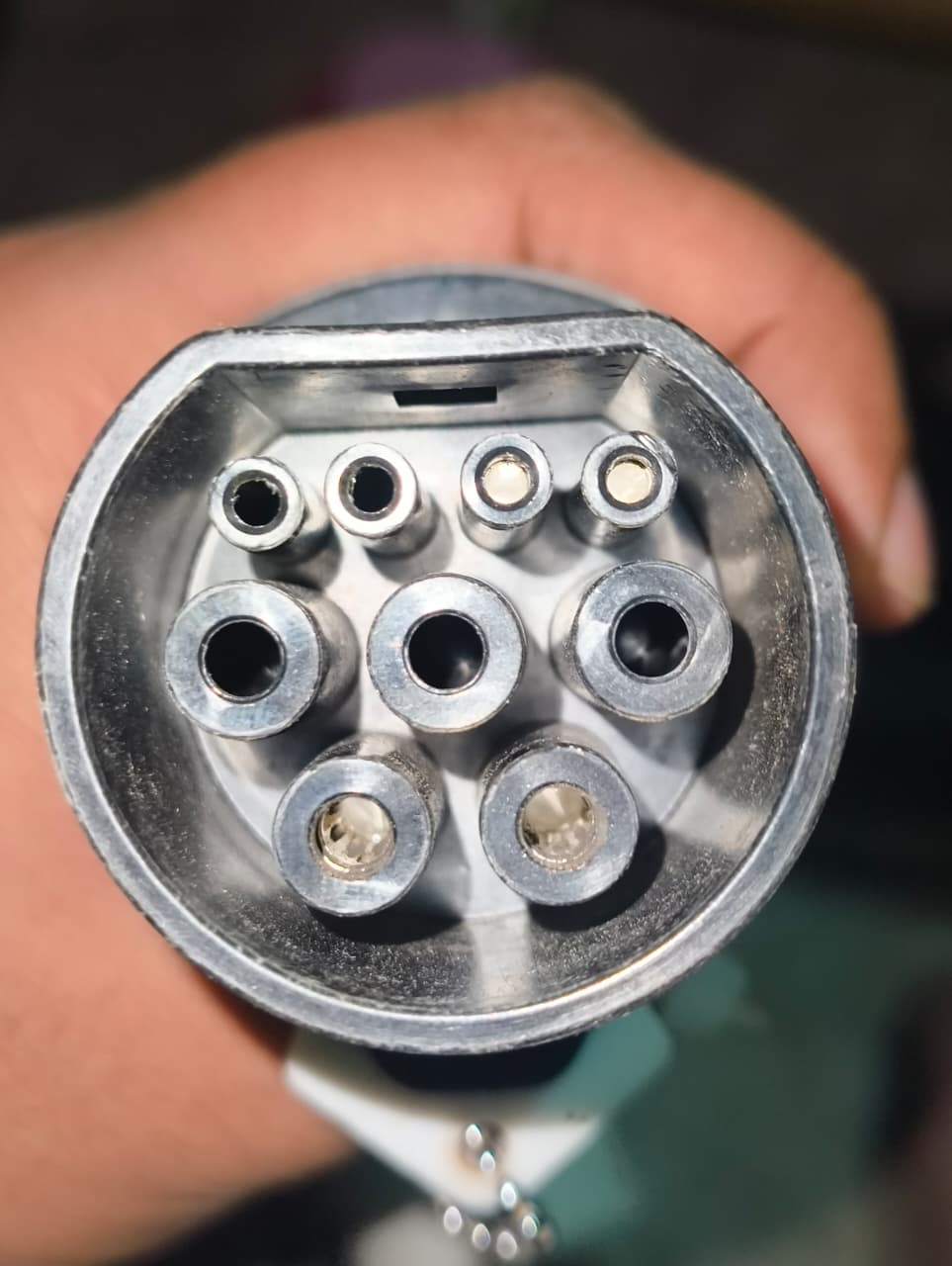
Ather Type 7 Charging plug

=== Power ratings ===
The Type 7 connector supports:

- AC charging: Up to 7.7 kW (240 V, 32 A single-phase)
- DC fast charging: Up to 12 kW (120 V, 100 A)

With DC fast charging capabilities, a typical electric scooter can charge to 80% capacity in under an hour, with some chargers capable of adding approximately 15 km of range in 10 minutes of charging.

=== Pin configuration ===
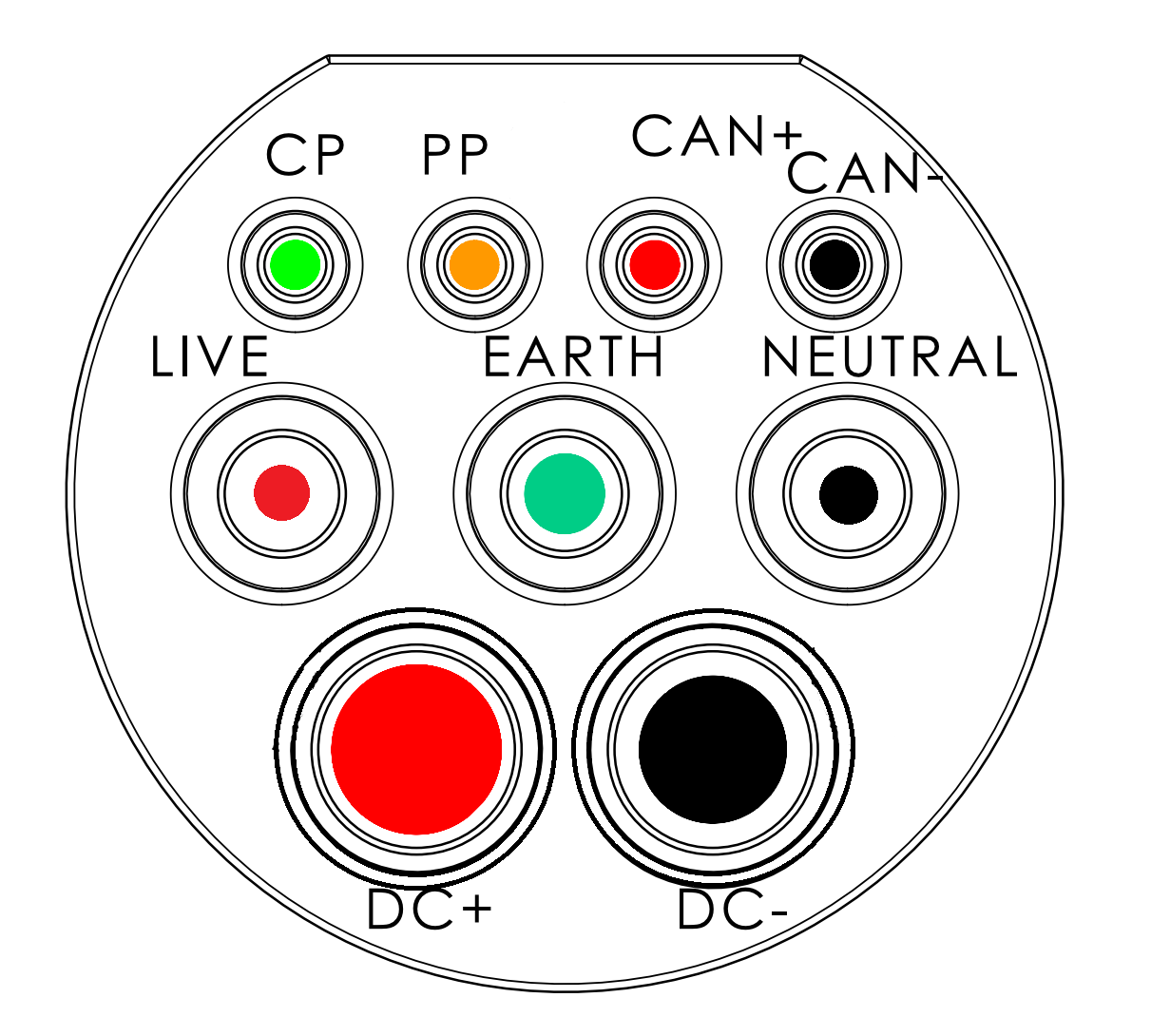

The connectors contain seven contact places arranged in a specific pattern. The pins are always used for the following purposes:

- Proximity pilot (PP): Pre-insertion signaling
- Control pilot (CP): Post-insertion signaling and initial handshake
- Protective earth (PE): Full-current protective earthing system
- CAN High: Communication via CAN bus protocol
- CAN Low: Communication via CAN bus protocol
- AC/DC power pins: Dual-purpose contacts for both AC and DC power transmission

Communication takes place over the CAN bus (CAN High and CAN Low pins) for data exchange between the charger and vehicle after the initial control pilot (CP) handshake. This protocol ensures that the highest common denominator of voltage and current is selected for safe and efficient charging. The connector supports up to 100 A current rating for DC charging applications.

== Adoption ==
=== Manufacturers ===
Several electric vehicle manufacturers have adopted the Type 7 connector standard for their products:

- Ather Energy – Original developer, uses LECCS on all current models including the Ather 450 series and Ather Rizta
- Hero MotoCorp – Implemented on the Vida V1 electric scooter
- Matter Motors – Adopted LECCS for their electric two-wheeler lineup
- The Energy Company – Battery pack manufacturer supporting the LECCS standard

According to industry reports, the LECCS connector is compatible with over 90% of India's electric two-wheelers as of 2025.

=== Infrastructure ===
As of January 2026, the LECCS charging network has grown significantly across India and neighboring countries:

- More than 5,000 public fast chargers equipped with the Type 7 connector
- Network spans over 395 cities across India
- Approximately 3,675 chargers operated directly by Ather Energy
- Additional 1,400+ chargers operated by partner charging networks
- Over 30 fast chargers operational in Nepal and Sri Lanka

Major charging infrastructure operators supporting Type 7 include:

- Bolt.Earth – First charging company to launch universal fast chargers with Type 7 compatibility, offering 3 kW, 6 kW, and 12 kW variants
- Kazam – Multi-brand charging network operator
- EVamp – Charging infrastructure provider
- Massive Mobility – Manufacturer of Type 7 compatible chargers

== Comparison with other standards ==
=== Type 6 connector ===
The Type 7 connector is often compared with the Type 6 connector (IS 17017) (also known as Dash-6 or LEVDC), which is another charging standard for light electric vehicles in India. Key differences include:

Feature	Type 6	Type 7
Charging type	DC only	Combined AC/DC
Maximum DC current	125 A	100 A
Maximum DC voltage	120 V	120 V
AC capability	No	Yes (up to 7.7 kW)
Latch location	Charger side	Vehicle side
Communication	CAN bus	CAN bus
Standard	IS 17017-2-6	IS 17017-2-7
Base technology	CHAdeMO e-PTW	Ather proprietary

Both standards are recognized under India's IS 17017 specifications and use CAN bus for communication after the initial control pilot handshake. Type 6 is primarily suited for dedicated DC fast charging applications, while Type 7 provides a unified solution for both AC and DC charging through a single port.

=== Global standards ===
Unlike four-wheeler charging standards such as CCS, CHAdeMO, or GB/T, the Type 7 connector is specifically designed for the lighter weight, lower voltage requirements, and space constraints of two-wheelers and three-wheelers. The LECCS standard represents India's indigenous contribution to global EV charging infrastructure and is the world's first combined AC/DC charging solution specifically developed for light electric vehicles.

The Type 1 connector (SAE J1772) is used for AC charging in North America and some Asian markets, while the Type 2 connector (Mennekes) is the standard AC connector in Europe. However, neither of these standards is optimized for the unique requirements of electric two-wheelers and three-wheelers in terms of power levels, physical size, and cost considerations.

== Interoperability and impact ==
The standardization of the Type 7 connector addresses a critical challenge in India's EV ecosystem: charging infrastructure fragmentation. Before standardization, the Indian two-wheeler industry used over 10 different types of charging connectors, creating compatibility issues and limiting infrastructure development. The adoption of LECCS as a common standard enables cross-brand charging compatibility, reduced infrastructure investment costs for charging operators, improved user experience through widespread charger availability, and faster deployment of charging networks.

The open-sourcing of the Type 7 connector by Ather Energy in 2021 represents a collaborative approach to building EV infrastructure. By making the technology freely available, Ather facilitated industry-wide adoption and accelerated the development of an interoperable charging ecosystem. This approach has been credited with encouraging other manufacturers to adopt the standard rather than developing proprietary solutions.

== See also ==
- IEC 62196
- Type 6 connector (IS 17017)
- Electric vehicle charging network
- Ather Energy
- Combined Charging System
- SAE J1772
- CHAdeMO
- Bureau of Indian Standards
