= List of international prime ministerial trips made by Anthony Albanese =

This is a list of international prime ministerial trips made by Anthony Albanese, the 31st prime minister of Australia. As of October 2025, Albanese has made seventeen international trips to 34 sovereign countries, and one associated state (Cook Islands) since assuming office on 23 May 2022.

== Summary ==
The number of visits per country where Albanese travelled are:

- One: Antigua and Barbuda, Brazil, Brunei, Cambodia, Canada, Cook Islands, France, Germany, Italy, Laos, Lithuania, Palau, Peru, Samoa, South Africa, South Korea, Spain, Thailand, Timor-Leste, Tonga, Türkiye, Ukraine, Vanuatu, Vatican City, and Vietnam
- Two: India, Malaysia, New Zealand, Philippines, Solomon Islands, and United Arab Emirates
- Three: China, Japan, Papua New Guinea and the United Kingdom
- Four: Fiji and Singapore
- Five: Indonesia
- Eight: United States

World map highlighting countries visited by Anthony Albanese during his premiership, as of September 2026. One visit Two visits Three visits Four visits Five visits Australia

== 2022 ==
Country	Locations	Dates	Details	Image
Japan	Tokyo	23–25 May	Two days after winning the 2022 Australian federal election, and only hours after being sworn in, Albanese and Foreign Minister Penny Wong flew to Tokyo for a pre-scheduled meeting of the Quadrilateral Security Dialogue. Albanese met with Japanese prime minister Fumio Kishida, Indian prime minister Narendra Modi, and U.S. president Joe Biden.	
Indonesia	Jakarta; Bogor; Makassar	5–7 June	Albanese made his first official bilateral trip to Indonesia, accompanied by several of his new ministers, Darwin-based MP Luke Gosling, and Australian business leaders. He met with President Joko Widodo at Bogor Palace; the two leaders rode bicycles through the palace gardens. Further east, the delegation also visited Makassar, a city with historic ties to Aboriginal Australians and the site of a new Australian diplomatic mission.	
United Arab Emirates	Al Minhad Air Base	27 June	During a stopover to the NATO leaders summit, Albanese visited Australian Defence Force troops at Camp Baird, near Dubai.	
Spain	Madrid	27 June–1 July	Albanese was invited and attended the NATO leaders summit in Madrid as a NATO partner. Albanese also had a meeting individually with other world leaders, including Spanish prime minister Pedro Sánchez and Canadian prime minister Justin Trudeau in Madrid.	
France	Paris	1–2 July	Albanese was invited to visit Paris in mid-June by French president Emmanuel Macron, and did so after attending the NATO leaders summit. The meeting followed the previous Morrison government's abrupt cancellation of a French submarine contract. Albanese also visited the OECD in Paris.	
Ukraine	Kyiv; Bucha; Irpin	3–4 July	Albanese was invited to visit Ukraine by Ukrainian president Volodymyr Zelenskyy, and made the surprise visit after his visit to Paris. Albanese was shown around the wreckage from the Russian invasion including Bucha and Irpin. He then announced additional Australian military aid for Ukraine. This visit made him the first Australian prime minister to visit Ukraine. Prior to the visit, Albanese was understood to be considering the security risks of the journey. Due to the security risks, it was not announced whether he would visit Ukraine until his visit to Ukraine was revealed on social media.	
Fiji	Suva	13–14 July	Albanese attended the 51st Pacific Islands Forum in Suva, Fiji. It was Albanese's first PIF meeting, and the first time the Pacific Islands Forum has met in person since 2019.	
United Kingdom	London	16–20 September	Albanese and others, including Governor-General David Hurley, attended the state funeral of Queen Elizabeth II. Albanese met with new monarch King Charles III and also held bilateral meetings with Prime Minister Liz Truss and Canadian prime minister Justin Trudeau.	
Japan	Tokyo	26–28 September	Albanese, along with three of his predecessors, travelled to Japan to attend the state funeral of former Japanese prime minister Shinzo Abe, held on 27 September. Albanese also held a bilateral meeting with U.S. Vice President Kamala Harris.	cemter
Cambodia	Phnom Penh	11–14 November	Albanese attended the East Asian Summit, the ASEAN Summit and the 2nd Annual ASEAN-Australia Summit.	
Indonesia	Bali	14–17 November	Albanese attended the G20 summit. He joined Indonesian president Joko Widodo and Indian prime minister Narendra Modi to deliver a keynote address at the Business 20 Summit.	
Thailand	Bangkok	17–19 November	Albanese attended the 29th APEC summit.	

== 2023 ==
Country	Locations	Dates	Details	Image
Papua New Guinea	Port Moresby; Wewak	12–13 January	Albanese attended the Annual Leaders' Dialogue alongside PNG Prime Minister James Marape. and visited the gravesite of Papua New Guinea's inaugural Prime Minister Michael Somare. The trip was originally planned for December 2022 but was postponed due to Albanese contracting COVID-19.	
India	Ahmedabad; Mumbai; New Delhi	8—11 March	Albanese visited New Delhi to attend the Australia–India Annual Leaders' Summit and met Indian prime minister Narendra Modi. During the visit, he also led a trade delegation, which included Trade Minister Don Farrell and Resources Minister Madeleine King, after the implementation of the Economic Cooperation and Trade Agreement (ECTA) between Australia and India on 29 December 2022. Albanese and Modi also attended the Fourth Test Match of the Border–Gavaskar Trophy in Ahmedabad, at the 75 Years of Friendship through Cricket Event. This event was a celebration of the 75th anniversary of the strong ties between India and Australia.	
United States	San Diego	11–14 March	Albanese visited the United States to reveal Australia's preferred nuclear submarine for AUKUS, alongside President Joe Biden and British prime minister Rishi Sunak. Albanese also held bilateral meetings with both leaders.	
Fiji	Nadi	15 March	Albanese visited Fiji to hold bilateral meetings with new Fijian prime minister Sitiveni Rabuka.	
United Kingdom	Barrow-in-Furness; London	3–6 May	Albanese attended the coronation of Charles III with Governor-General David Hurley. Before the coronation, Albanese attended the AUKUS submarine facility in Barrow-in-Furness.	
Japan	Hiroshima	19–21 May	Albanese attended the G7 summit in Hiroshima in May. Japan invited Australia to be one of the countries attending even though it is not a member of the G7 (this invitation was hinted as far back as October last year). That year's Quad dialogue, originally due to be held in Australia, was instead held in Japan on 20 May after US president Biden had to cancel his Australian trip to return to the US early.	
Singapore	Singapore	1–2 June	Albanese delivered the keynote address at the 20th Shangri-La Dialogue and met with Prime Minister Lee Hsien Loong for annual bilateral discussions.	
Vietnam	Hanoi	3–4 June	Albanese travelled to Vietnam to mark 50 years of diplomatic relations between the two countries.	
Germany	Berlin	10 July	Albanese met with German chancellor Olaf Scholz ahead of the Vilnius NATO summit.	
Lithuania	Vilnius	11–12 July	Albanese travelled to Lithuania to attend the NATO 2023 Vilnius summit. It was the second time Australia has taken part in a NATO summit following the country's first invitation in 2022. Albanese also met with Ukrainian president Volodymyr Zelenskyy.	
New Zealand	Wellington	26–27 July	Albanese travelled to Wellington to meet with New Zealand prime minister Chris Hipkins for the annual Australia–New Zealand Leaders' Meeting. Albanese also met with New Zealand Opposition Leader Christopher Luxon. Albanese's visit occurred three months before the 2023 New Zealand general election.	
Indonesia	Jakarta	6–7 September	Albanese made his third trip to Indonesia to attend the 3rd Annual ASEAN-Australia Summit and the 18th East Asia Summit.	
Philippines	Manila	7–8 September	Albanese travelled to Manila, the first Australian prime minister to undertake a bilateral visit to the Philippines since 2003. He met with President Bongbong Marcos to "discuss defence and security cooperation." During his visit, the two leaders signed a strategic partnership agreement between Australia and the Philippines, agreeing to hold annual defence ministers' meetings.	
India	New Delhi	9–10 September	Albanese attended the G20 Leaders’ Summit in New Delhi.	
United States	Washington	23–26 October	Albanese attended a state dinner hosted by President Joe Biden at the White House. He also met Congressional leaders and visited Arlington National Cemetery.	
China	Shanghai; Beijing	4–7 November	Albanese met with Premier Li Qiang and attended the China International Import Expo. He also met with President Xi Jinping.	
Cook Islands	Rarotonga	7–9 November	Albanese joined Pacific leaders in the Cook Islands for the 52nd Pacific Islands Forum Leaders' Meeting.	
United States	San Francisco	15–17 November	Albanese attended the APEC Forum.	

== 2024 ==
Country	Locations	Dates	Details	Image
Papua New Guinea	Kokoda Track	22–25 April	Albanese met with PNG Prime Minister Marape James Marape and walked sections of the Kokoda Track to commemorate Anzac Day.	
Tonga	Nuku'alofa; Vava'u	28–29 August	Albanese attended the 53rd Pacific Islands Forum meeting.	
United States	Wilmington	20–21 September	Albanese attended the Quad Leaders meeting.	
Laos	Vientiane	9–11 October	Albanese attended 4th ASEAN-Australia Summit and 19th East Asia Summit.	
Samoa	Apia	24–26 October	Albanese attended the 2024 Commonwealth Heads of Government Meeting.	
Peru	Lima	14–17 November	Albanese attended APEC Peru 2024.	
Brazil	Rio de Janeiro	17–19 November	Albanese attended the G20 summit.	

== 2025 ==
Country	Locations	Dates	Details	Image
Indonesia	Jakarta	14–16 May	Albanese discussed international commerce and defense cooperation with President Prabowo Subianto.	
Italy	Rome	16–19 May	Albanese travelled to attend Papal inauguration of Pope Leo XIV. Met with Canadian prime minister Mark Carney and EU Commission President Ursula von der Leyen.	
Vatican City	Vatican City	18–19 May	Albanese attended the inauguration of Pope Leo XIV and had an audience with the Pope.	
Singapore	Singapore	20 May	Albanese met with Singapore Prime Minister Lawrence Wong.	
Fiji	Nadi	13 June	Albanese met with Fiji Prime Minister Sitiveni Rabuka in Nadi.	
United States	Seattle	14–15 June	Albanese met with business executives in Seattle, including Amazon Web Services chief executive, Matt Garman, to announce datacentre and renewable energy projects in Australia.	
Canada	Kananaskis	15–17 June	Albanese attended the 51st G7 summit.	
China	Beijing; Shanghai; Chengdu	12–18 July	Albanese flew to China, with business, trade and tourism a major focus of a trip that included annual leaders’ talks in Beijing with Premier Li Qiang, as well as meetings with President Xi Jinping and chairman Zhao Leji of the National People's Congress.	
New Zealand	Queenstown	9–10 August	Albanese attended the annual Australia-New Zealand Leaders' Meeting.	
Vanuatu	Port Vila	9–10 September	Albanese met Vanuatu Prime Minister Jotham Napat and held discussions on the Nakamal Agreement.	
Solomon Islands	Honiara; Noro	10–11 September	Albanese attended the 54th Pacific Islands Forum Leaders' Meeting in Solomon Islands.	
Papua New Guinea	Port Moresby	15–17 September	Albanese attended commemorations for the 50th anniversary of PNG's independence. Albanese met with PNG Prime Minister James Marape and signed a Joint communique on a Mutual Defence Treaty to be known as the 'Pukpuk Treaty'.	
United States	New York City	21–25 September	Albanese attended the General debate of the eightieth session of the United Nations General Assembly.	
United Kingdom	London; Balmoral Castle; Liverpool	25–28 September	Albanese met King Charles III and UK prime minister Sir Keir Starmer, and addressed the Labour Party Conference in Liverpool. He also attended the Global Progress Action Summit.	
United Arab Emirates	Abu Dhabi	29 September	Albanese met UAE president Sheikh Mohammed bin Zayed Al Nahyan.	
United States	Washington; St Louis	19–21 October	Albanese met US president Donald Trump.	
Malaysia	Kuala Lumpur	26–28 October	Albanese attended the 47th ASEAN and 20th East Asia Summits.	
South Korea	Gyeongju	29 October – 1 November	Albanese had dinner with other world leaders and attended the APEC South Korea 2025.	
South Africa	Johannesburg	22–23 November	Albanese attended the 2025 G20 Johannesburg summit.	

== 2026 ==
Country	Locations	Dates	Details	Image
Timor-Leste	Dili	28–29 January	Albanese addressed the parliament in Timor-Leste and met with prime minister Xanana Gusmao and president Jose Ramos-Horta to discuss energy and security ties.	
Indonesia	Jakarta	5–7 February	Albanese traveled to Indonesia to sign the Australia–Indonesia Treaty on Common Security.	
Singapore	Singapore	9–11 April	Albanese met with prime minister Lawrence Wong to address Singapore and Australia's fuel and gas requirements in response to the Iran war fuel crisis.	
Brunei	Bandar Seri Begawan	14–16 April	Albanese met with Sultan Hassanal Bolkiah to discuss trade and energy security.	
Malaysia	Kuala Lumpur	16–17 April	Albanese met with prime minister Anwar Ibrahim to discuss energy security and to sign a memorandum of understanding with Malaysia's Department of Islamic Development on behalf of Australia's Department of Agriculture, Fisheries and Forestry.	
Fiji	Suva	5-6 July	Albanese met with prime minister Sitiveni Rabuka and signed the Fiji-Australia Vuvale Union and Ocean of Peace Alliance.	
Solomon Islands	Honiara	7 July	Albanese met with prime minister Matthew Wale to discuss bilateral relations and attend Solomon Islands' 48th Independence Day celebrations as Guest of Honour.	
Palau	Koror	31 August–3 September	Albanese attended the 55th PIF summit.	
United States	Cupertino, New York City	18-24 September	Albanese met with Apple CEO Tim Cook to discuss new 'parental-controls' for children and Australia's digital reform legislation. Albanese attended the 81th United Nations General Assembly in New York City.	
Antigua and Barbuda	St. John's	1–4 November	Albanese attended the 2026 Commonwealth Heads of Government Meeting.	
Singapore	Singapore	11 November	Albanese stopped in Singapore whilst en-route to Turkey for the UN Climate Change Conference. He attended a Remembrance Day memorial service.	
Turkey	Antalya	12-13 November	Albanese attended the 2026 United Nations Climate Change Conference.	
Philippines	Manila	14-17 November	Albanese attended the 21th East Asia summit, Australia-ASEAN summit and a meeting of the Quadrilateral Security Dialogue.	
China	Shenzhen	18–19 November	Albanese attended the APEC China 2026.	

== Future trips ==
Country	Location	Date	Details
United States	Miami	14–15 December	Albanese is scheduled to attend the 2026 G20 summit.

== Multilateral meetings ==
Prime Minister Albanese may attend the following summits during his premiership:

Group	Year					
Group	2022	2023	2024	2025	2026	2027
UNGA	23 September^{[a]}, (United States) New York City	22 September^{[a]}, (United States) New York City	22 September^{[a]}, (United States) New York City	21–25 September, (United States) New York City	22–25 September, (United States) New York City	TBD, (United States) New York City
G20	15–16 November, (Indonesia) Bali	9–10 September, (India) New Delhi	18–19 November, (Brazil) Rio de Janeiro	22–23 November, (South Africa) Johannesburg	14–15 December, (United States) Miami	27–28 November, (United Kingdom) Manchester
EAS (ASEAN)	12–13 November, (Cambodia) Phnom Penh	6–7 September, (Indonesia) Jakarta	10–11 October, (Laos) Vientiane	26–28 October, (Malaysia) Kuala Lumpur	16–18 November, (Philippines) Manila	TBA
G7	Not a G7 Member	19–21 May, (Japan) Hiroshima	Not a G7 Member	16–17 June, (Canada) Kananaskis	Not a G7 Member	
NATO	28–30 June, (Spain) Madrid	11–12 July, (Lithuania) Vilnius	9–11 July^{[b]}, (United States) Washington	24–25 June^{[b]}, (Netherlands) The Hague	7–8 July, (Turkey) Ankara	TBD, (Albania) Tirana
APEC	18–19 November, (Thailand) Bangkok	15–17 November, (United States) San Francisco	15–16 November, (Peru) Lima	31 October – 1 November, (South Korea) Gyeongju	18–19 November, (China) Shenzhen	TBD, Vietnam
COP	6–18 November, (Egypt) Sharm El Sheikh	30 November–12 December, (United Arab Emirates) Dubai	11–22 November, (Azerbaijan) Baku	10 November, (Brazil) Belém	9-20 November, (Turkey) Antalya, 5-8 October, Pre-COP meeting, (Fiji) Nadi	8-19 November, (Ethiopia) Addis Ababa
QUAD	24 May, (Japan) Tokyo	20 May, (Japan) Hiroshima	21 September, (United States) Wilmington	—N/a	TBA, (India) New Delhi	TBA
CHOGM	24–25 June^{[b]}, (Rwanda) Kigali	5–6 May, (United Kingdom) London	25–26 October, (Samoa) Apia	—N/a	1–4 November, (Antigua and Barbuda) St John's	—N/a
PIF	13–14 July, (Fiji) Suva	6–10 November, (Cook Islands) Rarotonga	26–30 August, (Tonga) Nuku'alofa	8–12 September, (Solomon Islands) Honiara	August 30 – September 4, Palau	TBD, New Zealand
Others	None	AUKUS; 13 March, (United States) San Diego	ASEAN–Australia Special Summit; 3–6 March, Melbourne	15 March, (videoconference); United Kingdom	TBA	TBA
Others	None	Korea–Pacific Islands Summit; 29–30 May^{[b]}, (South Korea) Seoul	Global Peace Summit; 15–16 June^{[c]} (Switzerland) Lucerne	Building a robust peace for Ukraine and Europe summit 27 March, (France) Paris	TBA	TBA
Others	None	Korea–Pacific Islands Summit; 29–30 May^{[b]}, (South Korea) Seoul	Global Peace Summit; 15–16 June^{[c]} (Switzerland) Lucerne	Global Progress Action Summit; 26–28 September, (United Kingdom) London		
██ = Future event ██ = Did not attend / participate.^aMinister for Foreign Affairs Penny Wong attended in the prime minister's place.^bDeputy Prime Minister Richard Marles attended in the prime minister's place.^cMinister for Government Services Bill Shorten attended in the prime minister's place.

== See also ==
- Foreign relations of Australia
- List of international prime ministerial trips made by Scott Morrison, his predecessor
