= Tijerina =

Tijerina is a surname. Notable people with the surname include:

- Arturo de la Garza Tijerina (born 1958), Mexican politician
- Felix Tijerina (1905–1965), Mexican-American restaurateur, activist and philanthropist
- Marco Aurelio Martínez Tijerina (1964/65–2010), Mexican journalist
- Reies Tijerina (1926–2015), American activist
- Tano Tijerina (born 1974), American rancher, businessman, and judge
