= List of international prime ministerial trips made by Scott Morrison =

This is a list of international prime ministerial trips made by Scott Morrison, the 30th Prime Minister of Australia. During his time in office (August 2018 to May 2022), Scott Morrison made twenty-nine international trips to eighteen sovereign countries.

== Summary ==
The number of visits per country where Morrison travelled are:

- One: Argentina, East Timor, Iraq, Italy, Papua New Guinea, the Solomon Islands, Thailand, Tuvalu, Vanuatu and Vietnam.
- Two: Fiji, France, Indonesia, Japan and the United States.
- Three: New Zealand, Singapore and the United Kingdom.

== 2018 ==
Country	Locations	Dates	Details	Image
Indonesia	Jakarta; Bogor	31 August–1 September	Morrison met President Joko Widodo, visited the SMPN 2 Babakan Madang school, and spoke at the Indonesia-Australia Business Forum.	
Singapore	Singapore	13–15 November	Morrison attended the 33rd ASEAN Summit, and met with Chinese Premier Li Keqiang, Indian Prime Minister Narendra Modi, Singaporean Prime Minister Lee Hsien Loong, and Indonesian President Widodo.	
Papua New Guinea	Port Moresby	17–19 November	Morrison attended the 2018 APEC Summit, met with U.S. Vice President Mike Pence, and visited HMAS Adelaide.	
Argentina	Buenos Aires	30 November–2 December	Morrison attended the 2018 G20 summit, and met with U.S. President Donald Trump, British Prime Minister Theresa May, German Chancellor Angela Merkel, and French President Emmanuel Macron.	
Iraq	Taji; Baghdad	20 December	Morrison visited Australian Operation Okra troops at Camp Taji, and met with Prime Minister Adil Abdul-Mahdi.	

== 2019 ==
Country	Locations	Dates	Details	Image
Vanuatu	Port Vila	15–16 January	Morrison met with Prime Minister Charlot Salwai.	
Fiji	Suva; Nadi	17–18 January	Morrison met with Prime Minister Frank Bainimarama.	
New Zealand	Auckland	22 February	Morrison met with Prime Minister Jacinda Ardern.	
New Zealand	Christchurch	29 March	Morrison attended the memorial service for victims of the Christchurch mosque shootings.	
Solomon Islands	Honiara	2–3 June	Morrison met with Prime Minister Manasseh Sogavare.	
United Kingdom	London; Portsmouth	4–6 June	Morrison met with Queen Elizabeth II and Charles, Prince of Wales, and attended the official commemoration of the 75th anniversary of D-Day.	
Singapore	Singapore	7 June	Morrison met with Prime Minister Lee Hsien Loong.	
Japan	Osaka	27–29 June	Morrison attended the 2019 G20 summit, and met with U.S. President Donald Trump.	
Tuvalu	Funafuti	14–16 August	Morrison attended the 2019 Pacific Islands Forum Leaders Meeting.	
Vietnam	Hanoi	22–24 August	Morrison met with Prime Minister Nguyễn Xuân Phúc.	
France	Biarritz	24–26 August	Morrison attended the 45th G7 summit, and met with Japanese Prime Minister Shinzo Abe, U.S. President Donald Trump, British Prime Minister Boris Johnson, French President Emmanuel Macron, and Indian Prime Minister Narendra Modi.	
East Timor	Dili	30–31 August	Morrison met with Prime Minister Taur Matan Ruak and attended the 20th anniversary of the 1999 East Timorese independence referendum.	
United States	Washington, D.C.; Wapakoneta; Chicago; New York City	19–27 September	Morrison attended a state dinner hosted by President Donald Trump at the White House, opened a Visy paper mill in Ohio alongside Trump and Anthony Pratt, gave a keynote speech to the Chicago Council on Global Affairs, and delivered the Australian National Statement to the seventy-fourth session of the United Nations General Assembly.	
Fiji	Suva	11–12 October	Morrison met with Prime Minister Bainimarama and attended a Prime Minister's XIII rugby league match.	
Indonesia	Jakarta	19–20 October	Morrison attended the inauguration of President Joko Widodo following his re-election.	
Thailand	Bangkok	3–4 November	Morrison attended the fourteenth East Asia Summit, and met with Chinese Premier Li Keqiang, Indian Prime Minister Narendra Modi, and several Southeast Asian leaders.	

== 2020 ==
Morrison was scheduled to visit India and Japan in January 2020, but postponed these trips due to the Black Summer bushfires, and later due to the COVID-19 pandemic in Australia. The India-Australia summit was eventually held virtually in June 2020. Morrison was also due to visit Papua New Guinea in November 2020, but deferred this trip due to Prime Minister James Marape's sudden decline in parliamentary support.

Country	Locations	Dates	Details	Image
Japan	Tokyo	17–18 November	Morrison became one of the first world leaders to meet with new Prime Minister Yoshihide Suga.	

== 2021 ==
Country	Locations	Dates	Details	Image
New Zealand	Queenstown	30–31 May	Following the opening of a travel bubble between their two countries, Morrison met with Prime Minister Jacinda Ardern for their Annual Leaders Dialogue.	
Singapore	Singapore	10 June	Morrison met with Prime Minister Lee Hsien Loong.	
United Kingdom	Carbis Bay; London	11–15 June	Morrison attended the G7 summit in Cornwall, toured Cornwall while tracing his Cornwall ancestry. He then negotiated and signed a free trade deal with British Prime Minister Boris Johnson on 15 June at 10 Downing Street.	
France	Paris	15 June	Morrison met with President Emmanuel Macron to discuss submarines, weapons and trade conflict with China.	
United States	New York City; Washington, D.C.	21–27 September	Morrison attended the seventy-sixth session of the United Nations General Assembly, and met with President Joe Biden after the assembly. He then met with British Prime Minister Boris Johnson for dinner at Washington, D.C., and attended the Quad leader's summit.	
Italy	Rome	30–31 October	Morrison attended the 2021 G20 summit.	
United Kingdom	Glasgow	1–2 November	Morrison attended the 2021 United Nations Climate Change Conference.	

== 2022 ==
Morrison did not make any prime ministerial overseas visits in the period between attending COP26 in Glasgow and his loss of the 2022 Australian federal election.

== Multilateral meetings ==
Scott Morrison attended the following summits during his prime ministership:

Group	Year			
Group	2018	2019	2020	2021
UNGA	28 September^{[a]}, (United States) New York City	24–27 September, (United States) New York City	25 September, (videoconference) (United States) New York City	21–24 September, (United States) New York City
APEC	17–18 November, (Papua New Guinea) Port Moresby	16–17 November, (cancelled) (Chile) Santiago	20 November, (videoconference) (Malaysia) Kuala Lumpur	12 November, (videoconference) (New Zealand) Auckland
EAS (ASEAN)	14–15 November, Singapore	4 November, (Thailand) Bangkok	14 November, (videoconference) (Vietnam) Hanoi	26–27 October, (videoconference) (Brunei) Bandar Seri Begawan
G7		24–26 August, (France) Biarritz	10–12 June, (cancelled) (United States) Camp David	11–13 June, (United Kingdom) Carbis Bay
G20	30 November – 1 December, (Argentina) Buenos Aires	28–29 June, (Japan) Osaka	21–22 November, (videoconference) (Saudi Arabia) Riyadh	30–31 October, (Italy) Rome
CHOGM		None		
PIF	5 September, (Nauru) Yaren	14–16 August, (Tuvalu) Funafuti	None	6 August, (videoconference) (Fiji) Suva
COP	2–15 December, (Poland) Katowice	2–13 December, (Spain) Madrid	none	1–2 November, (United Kingdom) Glasgow
██ = Did not attend^aForeign Minister Marise Payne attended in the Prime Minister's place and first speech to the UNGA General Debate as Foreign Minister.

== See also ==
- Foreign relations of Australia
- List of international prime ministerial trips made by Malcolm Turnbull, his predecessor
- List of international prime ministerial trips made by Anthony Albanese, his successor
