= Arturo de la Garza González =

Mexican politician (1936–2011)

- Born: 1 August 1936; Monterrey, Nuevo León, Mexico
- Died: 28 January 2011 (aged 74); China, Nuevo León, Mexico
- Education: Autonomous University of Nuevo León
- Occupations: Politician and businessman
- Political party: PRI
- Children: Arturo de la Garza Tijerina

Arturo de la Garza González (1 August 1936 – 28 January 2011) was a Mexican politician and businessman from the Institutional Revolutionary Party. From 1970 to 1973 he served as Deputy of the XLVIII Legislature of the Mexican Congress representing Nuevo León. He also served as member of the Congress of Nuevo León from 1961 to 1964.

On 28 January 2011 he was kidnapped by unknown men being found murdered some hours later in China, Nuevo León.
