= Humberto Cervantes Vega =

Mexican lawyer and politician

- Born: 7 March 1944 (age 82); Nieves, Zacatecas, Mexico
- Occupations: Lawyer and politician
- Political party: PRI

Humberto Cervantes Vega (born 7 March 1944) is a Mexican lawyer and politician affiliated with the Institutional Revolutionary Party (PRI). He has been elected to the Chamber of Deputies on two occasions: in the 1985 mid-terms (53rd Congress) for Nuevo León's 9th district, and in the 2003 mid-terms (59th Congress) for Nuevo León's 2nd district.

He previously served in the Congress of Nuevo León from 1976 to 1979 and as municipal president of Guadalupe from 1980 to 1982.
