= Ildefonso Guajardo Villarreal =

Mexican economist and politician

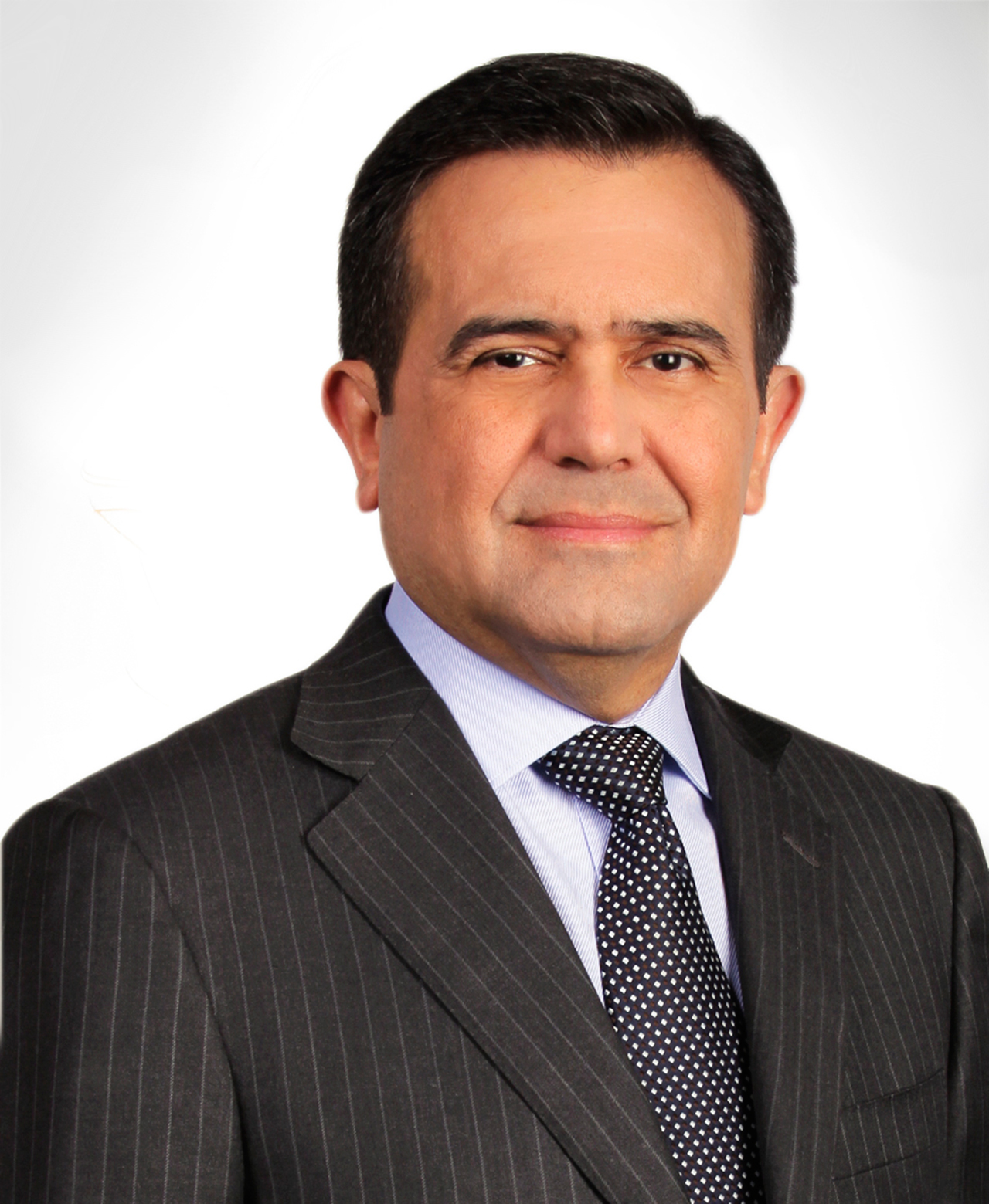

Secretary of Economy
- In office 1 December 2012 – 30 November 2018
- President: Enrique Peña Nieto
- Preceded by: Bruno Ferrari García de Alba
- Succeeded by: Graciela Márquez Colín

Personal details
- Born: 19 April 1957 (age 69) Monterrey, Nuevo León, Mexico
- Party: PRI
- Education: Universidad Autónoma de Nuevo León; Arizona State University
- Profession: Economist and politician

Ildefonso Guajardo Villarreal (born 19 April 1957) is a Mexican economist and politician from the Institutional Revolutionary Party (PRI). He served as the Secretary of Economy during the presidency of Enrique Peña Nieto.

He also served in the Chamber of Deputies during the 58th (2000–2003) and 61st (2009–2012, for Nuevo León's 2nd) sessions of Congress (Mexico).

For more than three decades, he served in a wide range of leading positions in international organizations and the public sector, both in the legislative and executive branches of Mexico, in charge of such matters as international trade, trade negotiations, economic competition, industrial policy, and regulatory improvement.

During his tenure as Secretary of Economy, he led many trade negotiations, such as the modernization of the United States-Mexico-Canada Agreement (USMCA, formerly NAFTA) the Free Trade Agreement between Mexico and the European Union, and the negotiations of the Comprehensive and Progressive Agreement for Trans-Pacific Partnership (CPTPP) and the Pacific Alliance.
