= List of international prime ministerial trips made by Tony Abbott =

This is a list of international prime ministerial trips made by Tony Abbott, the 28th Prime Minister of Australia. During his time in office (18 September 2013 – 15 September 2015), Tony Abbott made 28 international visits to 21 sovereign countries and territories.

== Summary ==
The number of visits per country are as follows:

- One: Afghanistan, Brunei, Canada, Iraq, India, Japan, Malaysia, Myanmar, Netherlands, Singapore, South Africa, South Korea, Sri Lanka, Switzerland, Turkey
- Two: China, France, New Zealand, United States
- Three or more: Indonesia (3), Papua New Guinea (3)

== 2013 ==
| Country | Locations | Dates | Details | Image |
|---|---|---|---|---|
| Indonesia | Jakarta | 30 September – 1 October | First overseas trip as Prime Minister. Met with President Susilo Bambang Yudhoyono to discuss bilateral relations, trade, investment and regional cooperation. | |
| Indonesia | Bali | 6–8 October | Attended APEC Indonesia 2013. Held bilateral discussions with regional leaders including Japanese Prime Minister Shinzō Abe. | |
| Brunei | Bandar Seri Begawan | 9–10 October | Attended the East Asia Summit and related ASEAN meetings, following the APEC summit in Indonesia. | |
| Afghanistan | Kabul | 28 October | First visit to Afghanistan as Prime Minister. Met with Afghan leaders and Australian personnel serving in the country. | |
| Sri Lanka | Colombo | 15–17 November | Attended the 2013 Commonwealth Heads of Government Meeting. Discussed bilateral cooperation, including measures to combat people smuggling. | |
| South Africa | Johannesburg | 9–11 December | Attended memorial events for former South African President Nelson Mandela. | |

== 2014 ==
| Country | Locations | Dates | Details | Image |
|---|---|---|---|---|
| Switzerland | Davos | 21–24 January | Attended the World Economic Forum in Davos. Discussed global economic conditions and Australia's role in the international economy. | |
| Papua New Guinea | Port Moresby | 20–23 March | Official visit. Held discussions with Prime Minister Peter O'Neill concerning bilateral relations, asylum seekers and regional cooperation. | |
| Japan | Tokyo | 5–8 April | Official visit. Met with Prime Minister Shinzō Abe and discussed trade, security and bilateral relations, including the Japan–Australia Economic Partnership Agreement. | |
| South Korea | Seoul | 8–9 April | Official visit. Met with President Park Geun-hye and discussed bilateral relations, trade and security. | |
| China | Beijing, Shanghai | 9–12 April | Official visit. Met with President Xi Jinping and Premier Li Keqiang. Discussions focused on trade, security and negotiations for the China–Australia Free Trade Agreement. | |
| France | Paris | 5–8 June | Held bilateral talks with President François Hollande concerning trade, security and international affairs. | |
| Canada | Ottawa | 8–9 June | First visit to Canada as Prime Minister. Met with Prime Minister Stephen Harper and discussed bilateral relations and trade. | |
| United States | Washington, D.C., New York City | 9–15 June | Met with senior United States officials and business leaders. Discussed the Australia–United States alliance, economic ties and international security. | |
| Netherlands | The Hague | 10–12 August | Visited the Netherlands following the MH17 disaster and called for justice for the victims. Met with Dutch officials concerning the recovery and repatriation of victims. | |
| India | New Delhi, Mumbai | 4–5 September | Official visit. Met with Prime Minister Narendra Modi and announced an agreement allowing Australia to export uranium to India. | |
| Malaysia | Kuala Lumpur | 6 September | Met with Prime Minister Najib Razak. Discussions included the MH370 and MH17 disasters and bilateral defence relations. | |
| United States | New York City | 24–25 September | Attended the United Nations Security Council Summit on Foreign Terrorist Fighters and addressed the United Nations General Assembly during the 69th session. | |
| Papua New Guinea | Port Moresby | 18 October | Stopover en route to Indonesia for the inauguration of President-elect Joko Widodo. | |
| Indonesia | Jakarta | 19–20 October | Attended the inauguration of President Joko Widodo. Met with the new Indonesian government to discuss bilateral relations. | |
| China | Beijing | 9–11 November | Attended the 2014 APEC Economic Leaders' Meeting. Held bilateral meetings with Chinese leaders and discussed the Australia–China Free Trade Agreement. | |
| Myanmar | Naypyidaw | 12–13 November | Attended the East Asia Summit and related ASEAN meetings. | |

== 2015 ==
| Country | Locations | Dates | Details | Image |
|---|---|---|---|---|
| Iraq | Baghdad | 4 January | Unannounced visit to Australian military personnel in Iraq. Met with Iraqi officials and Australian Defence Force personnel involved in the international coalition against the Islamic State. | |
| New Zealand | Wellington | 26–28 February | Official visit. Held talks with Prime Minister John Key on defence, security and economic issues. | |
| New Zealand | Wellington | 19–21 April | Attended the dedication of the Australian National Memorial and commemorated the centenary of the Gallipoli campaign alongside New Zealand Prime Minister John Key. | |
| Turkey | Istanbul, Gallipoli | 21–25 April | Attended the centenary commemorations of the Gallipoli campaign. Met with President Recep Tayyip Erdoğan and Prime Minister Ahmet Davutoğlu to discuss regional security and foreign terrorist fighters. | |
| France | Paris, Villers-Bretonneux | 25–26 April | Visited the Australian National Memorial at Villers-Bretonneux and announced funding for the Sir John Monash Centre. Met with President François Hollande and Prime Minister Manuel Valls. | |
| Singapore | Singapore | 27–29 June | Official visit. Met with Prime Minister Lee Hsien Loong and signed the Australia–Singapore Comprehensive Strategic Partnership, strengthening cooperation in defence, security, trade and investment. | |
| Papua New Guinea | Port Moresby | 9–11 September | Final overseas visit as Prime Minister. Met with Prime Minister Peter O'Neill and discussed bilateral relations and regional issues. | |

== Multilateral meetings ==
Tony Abbott attended the following summits during his prime ministership:

| Group | Year | | |
| Group | 2013 | 2014 | 2015 |
|---|---|---|---|
| APEC | 6–8 October, (Indonesia) Bali | 9–11 November, (China) Beijing | none |
| EAS (ASEAN) | 9–10 October, (Brunei) Bandar Seri Begawan | 12–13 November, (Myanmar) Naypyidaw | none |
| CHOGM | 15–17 November, (Sri Lanka) Colombo | none | none |
| G20 | none | none | none |
| PIF | | 29–31 July, (Palau) Ngerulmud | 8–10 September, (Papua New Guinea) Port Moresby |
██ = Did not attend

== See also ==
- Foreign relations of Australia
- Abbott government
- List of international prime ministerial trips made by Malcolm Turnbull, his successor
