= Benito Caballero Garza =

Mexican politician and lawyer

- Born: 24 September 1965 (age 60); Monterrey, Nuevo León, Mexico
- Occupation: Politician
- Political party: PRI

Benito Caballero Garza (born 24 September 1965) is a Mexican politician and lawyer affiliated with the Institutional Revolutionary Party (PRI). In the 2012 general election he was elected to the Chamber of Deputies to represent Nuevo León's 2nd district during the 60th session of Congress.
