= Jorge Luis de la Garza =

Mexican politician

- Born: 9 December 1981 (age 44); Nuevo León, Mexico
- Occupation: Politician
- Political party: PRI

Jorge Luis de la Garza Treviño (born 9 December 1981) is a Mexican politician from the Institutional Revolutionary Party (PRI). From 2007 to 2009 he served in the Chamber of Deputies during the 60th Congress, representing Nuevo León's 2nd district as the alternate of Rodrigo Medina de la Cruz.
