= APEC Malaysia 2020 =

Economic meeting in Malaysia

- Host country: Malaysia
- Date: 20 November 2020
- Motto: Optimising Human Potential Towards a Resilient Future of Shared Prosperity: Pivot. Prioritise. Progress
- Venues: Kuala Lumpur (host) and various locations virtually
- Follows: APEC Papua New Guinea 2018; ~~APEC Chile 2019~~ (cancelled)
- Precedes: APEC New Zealand 2021
- Website: myapec2020.my (archived)

APEC Malaysia 2020 was the year-long hosting of Asia-Pacific Economic Cooperation (APEC) meetings in Malaysia from December 2019 until November 2020. Due to the COVID-19 pandemic, most of the meetings were held virtually, including the culminating Economic Leaders' Meeting.

This was Malaysia's second time hosting an APEC meeting, having hosted one in 1998.

After the virtual summit held on 20 November 2020, the APEC leaders issued the Kuala Lumpur Declaration.

== Theme ==
The official theme of the APEC Malaysia 2020 is "Optimising Human Potential Towards a Resilient Future of Shared Prosperity: Pivot. Prioritise. Progress". It was chosen to reflect the Asia Pacific region's resilience, agility and inclusive economic growth through the concept of Shared Prosperity during the COVID-19 pandemic.

== Logo ==
APEC Malaysia 2020 logo is an image of Malaysia's national flower, Hibiscus rosa-sinensis, known locally as Bunga Raya, literally meaning ‘celebratory flower’ which symbolises unity and diversity.

The 21 individual petals of the flower represents the spirit of unity of 21 APEC members in promoting regional economic integration, sustainable economic growth and prosperity in the Asia Pacific region, the different tone of red/maroon of the logo represents the diversity of the APEC members; the 3 pistils of different shades of blue in the centre that resemble the waves of the Pacific Ocean represents unity of all APEC members under its core principles of consensus, voluntary and non-binding; while the 14-pointed star represents the 14 states in Malaysia and the inspirations of APEC members after 2020.

== Events ==
=== Participants ===
This was the first APEC Meeting for Papua New Guinean Prime Minister James Marape, the host Malaysian Prime Minister Muhyiddin Yassin, Japanese Prime Minister Yoshihide Suga and Peruvian President Francisco Sagasti after their inaugurations and appointments on May 30, 2019, March 1, 2020, September 16, 2020 and November 17, 2020, respectively. It was also the last APEC meeting for United States President Donald Trump in his first presidency and the host, Malaysian Prime Minister Muhyiddin, who both stepped down on 20 January 2021 and 16 August 2021 following the 2020 United States presidential election and the inauguration of Joe Biden; and the 2020–2022 Malaysian political crisis, leading to Muhyiddin's resignation.

Two presidents who did not attend the APEC meeting were Mexican President Andrés Manuel López Obrador and Vietnamese President Nguyễn Phú Trọng. López Obrador was represented by his Minister of Economy Graciela Márquez Colín and Trọng sent Prime Minister Nguyễn Xuân Phúc in his place, respectively.

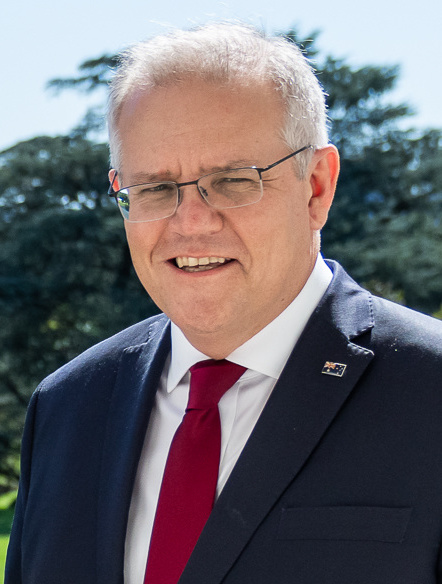
Australia
Scott Morrison,
Prime Minister

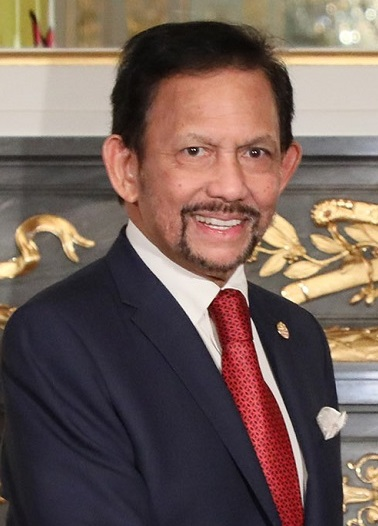
Brunei
Hassanal Bolkiah,
Sultan

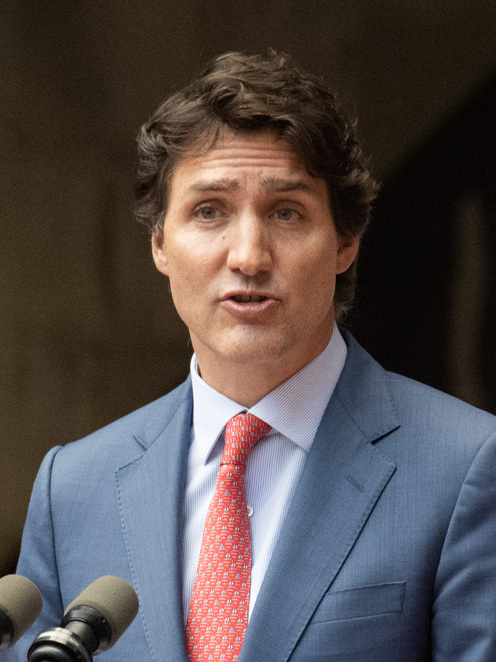
Canada
Justin Trudeau,
Prime Minister

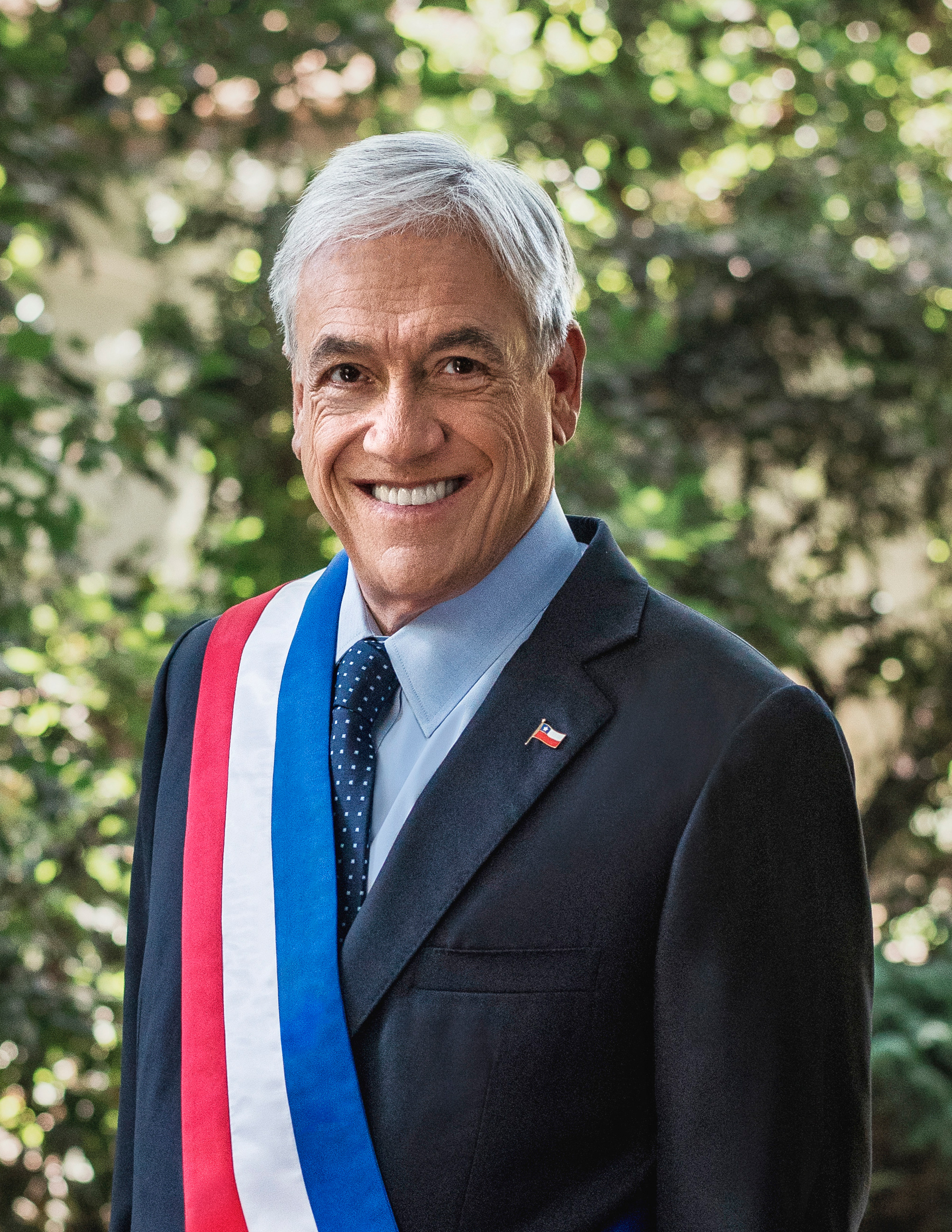
Chile
Sebastián Piñera,
President

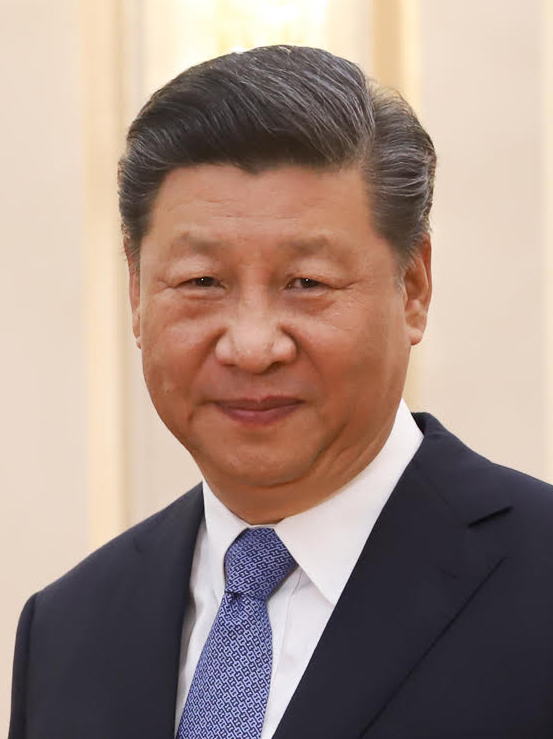
China
Xi Jinping,
President (Note: The President of China is legally a ceremonial office, but the General Secretary of the Chinese Communist Party (de facto leader in one-party communist state) has always held this office since 1993 except for the months of transition, and the current general secretary is Xi Jinping, who is also the Chinese President.)

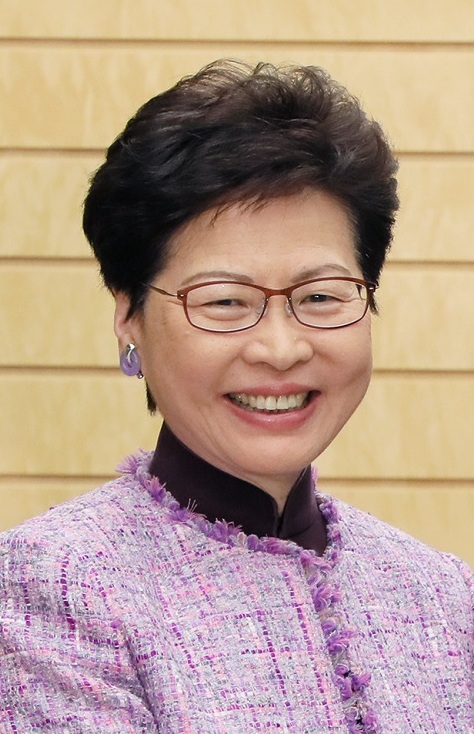
Hong Kong
Carrie Lam,
Chief Executive

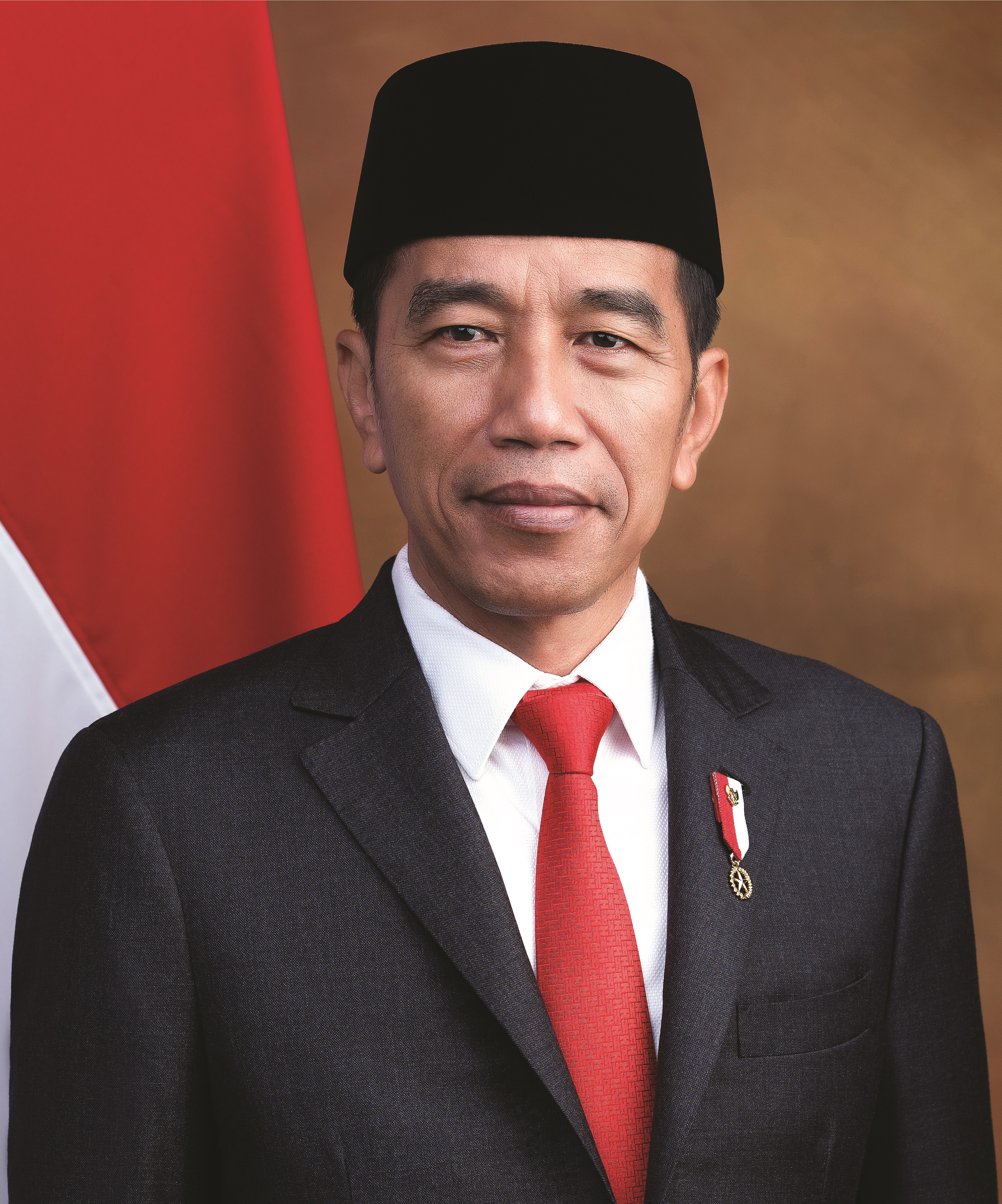
Indonesia
Joko Widodo,
President

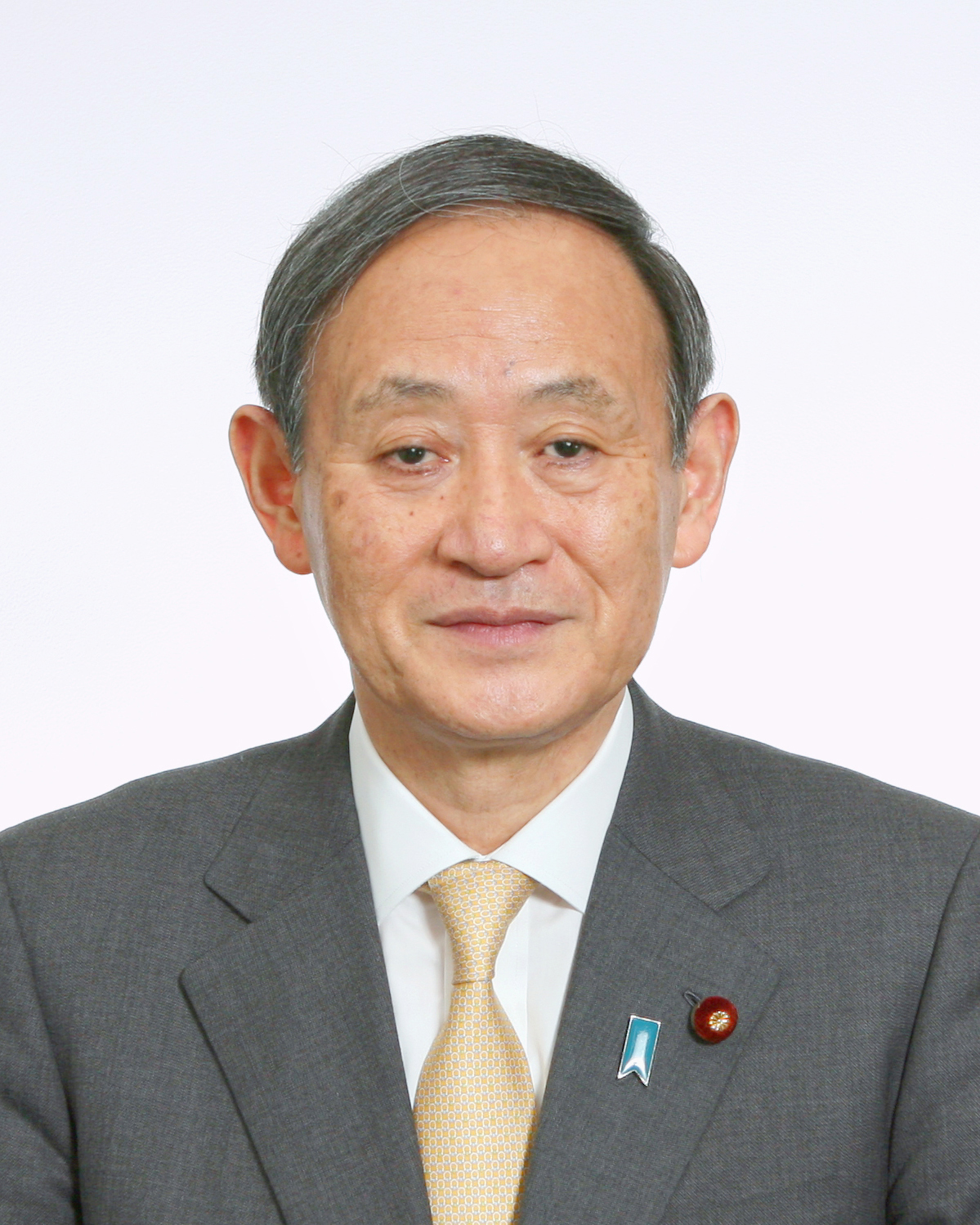
Japan
Yoshihide Suga,
Prime Minister

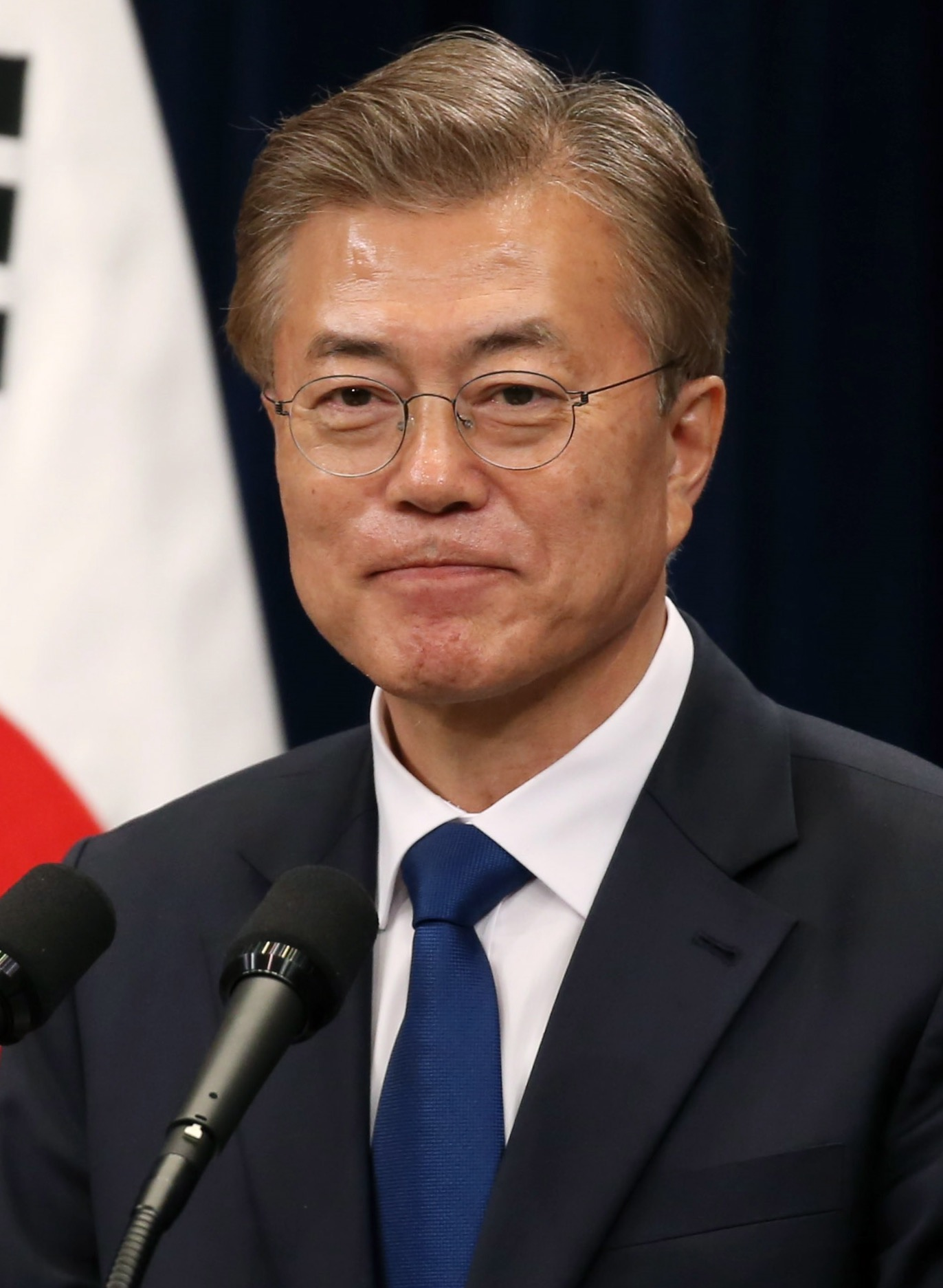
South Korea
Moon Jae-in,
President

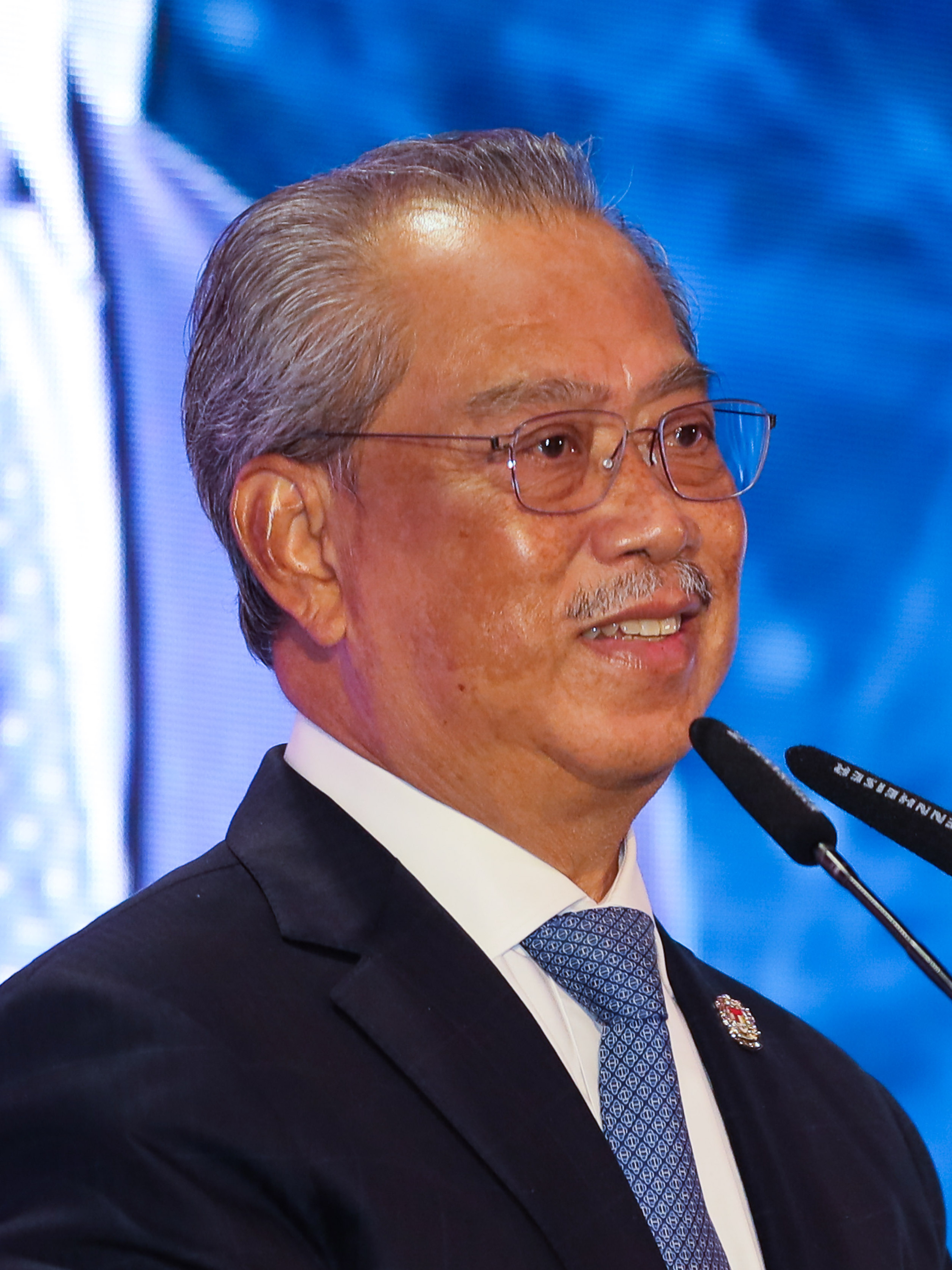
Malaysia
Muhyiddin Yassin,
Prime Minister (Host)

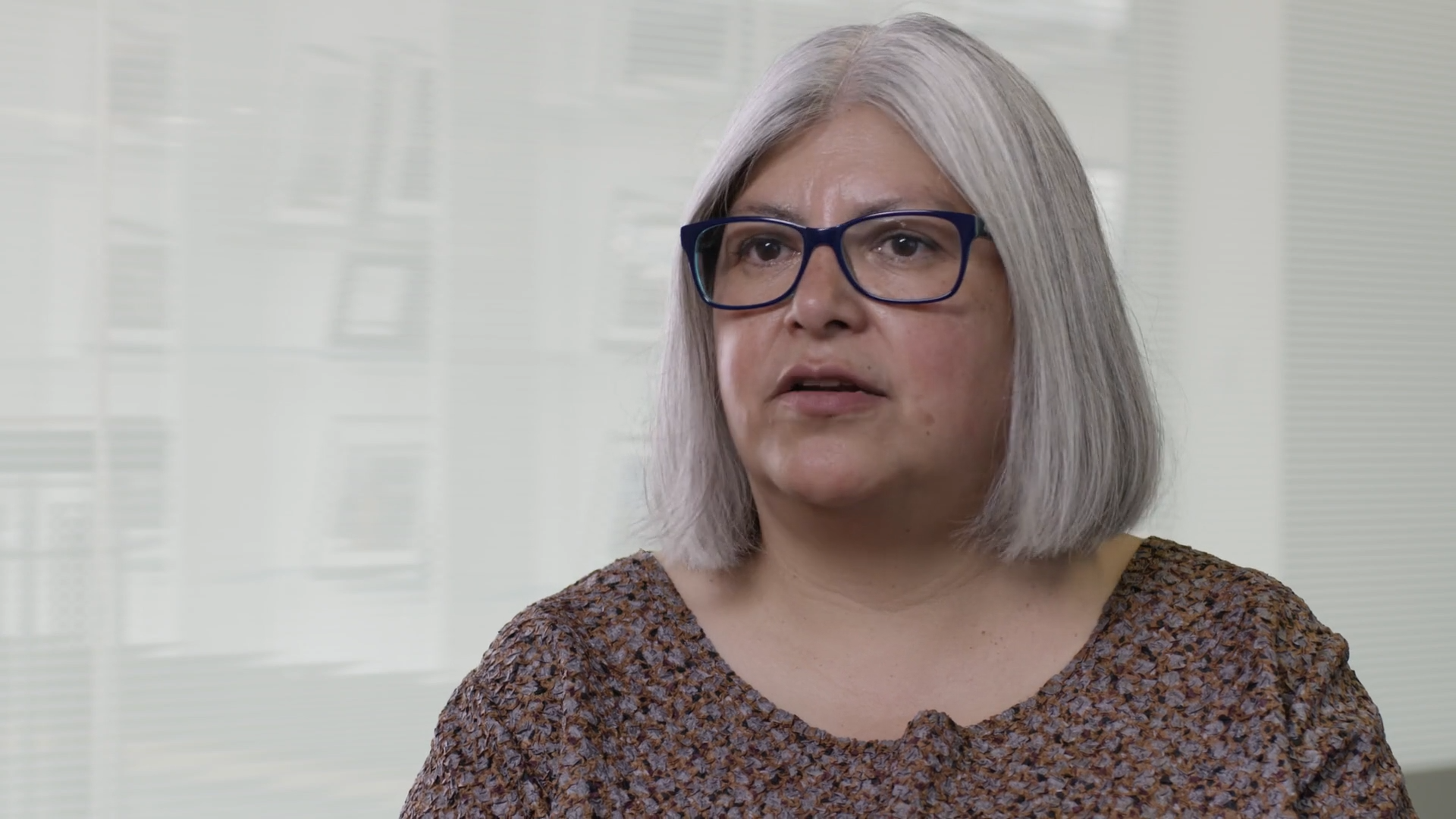
Mexico* (Note: (*) Mexican President Andrés Manuel López Obrador and Vietnamese President Nguyễn Phú Trọng did not attend the leaders' summit. Representatives of each country were sent to attend on their behalf.)
Graciela Márquez Colín,
Secretary of Economy

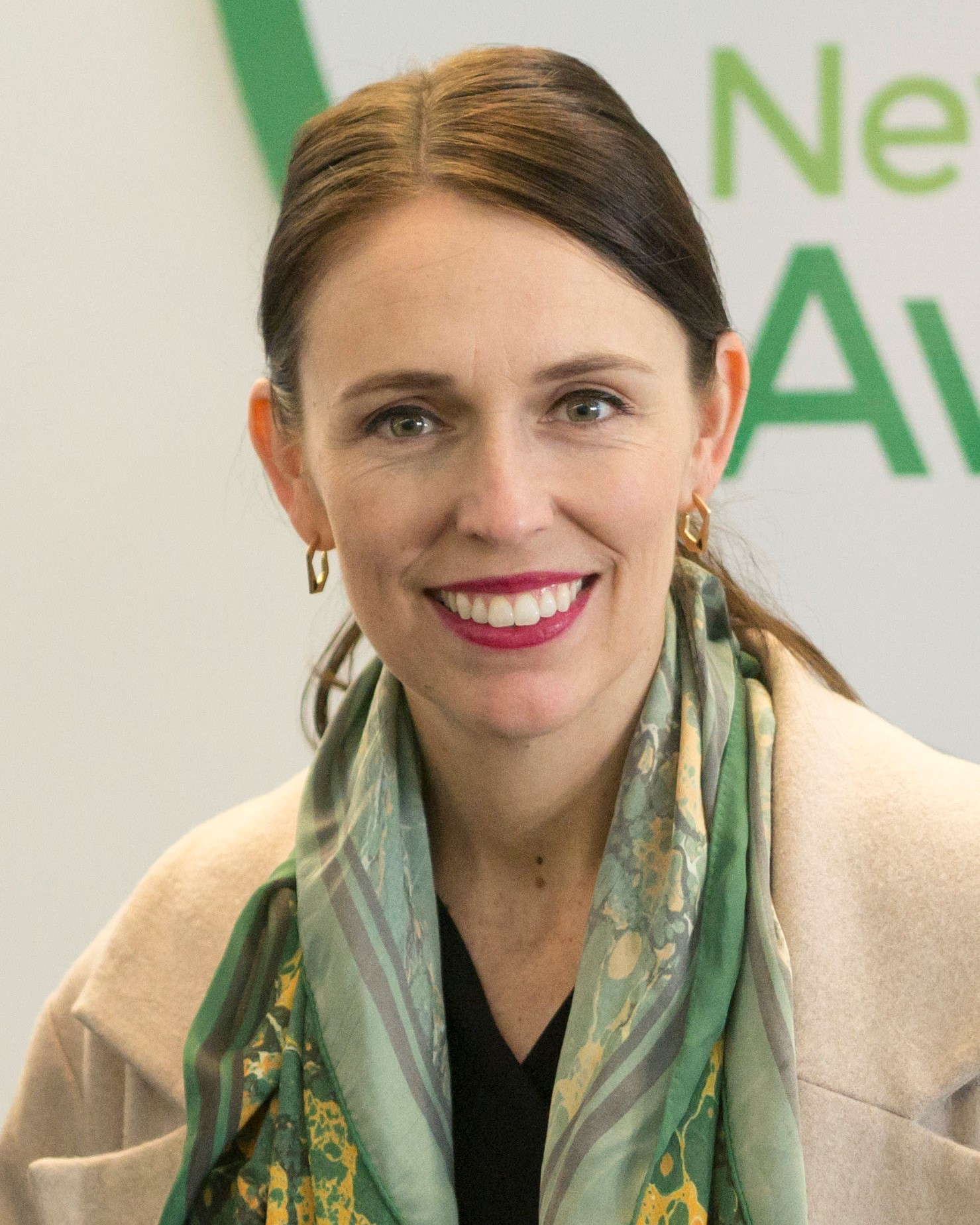
New Zealand
Jacinda Ardern,
Prime Minister

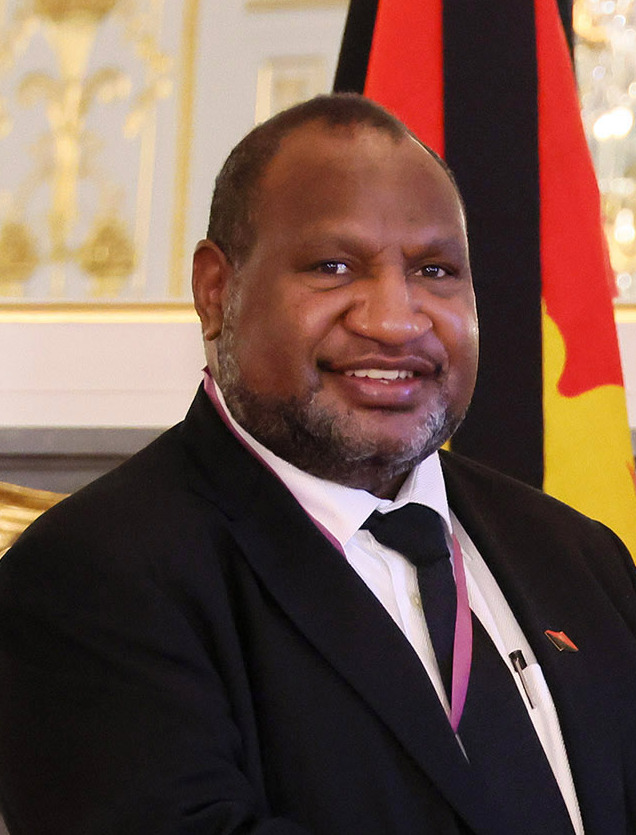
Papua New Guinea
James Marape,
Prime Minister

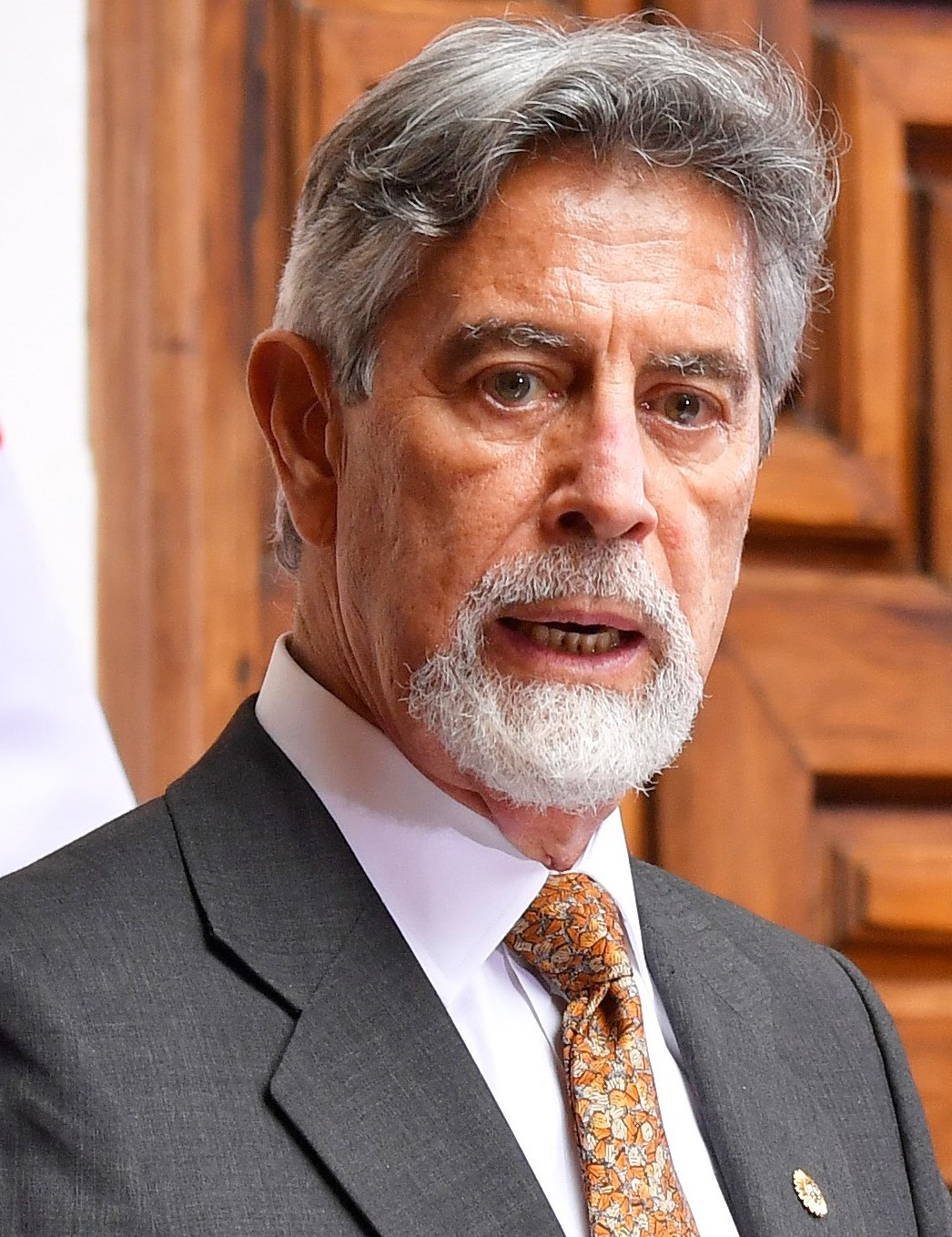
Peru
Francisco Sagasti,
President

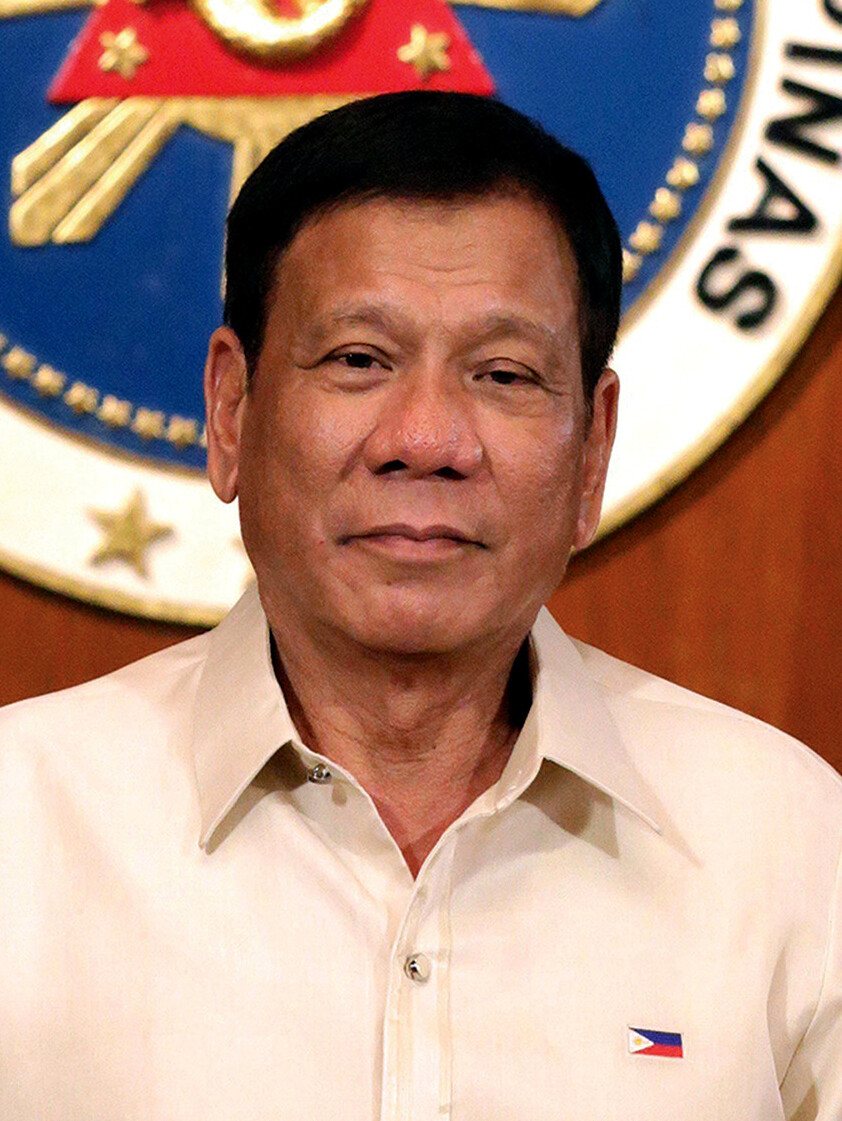
Philippines
Rodrigo Duterte,
President

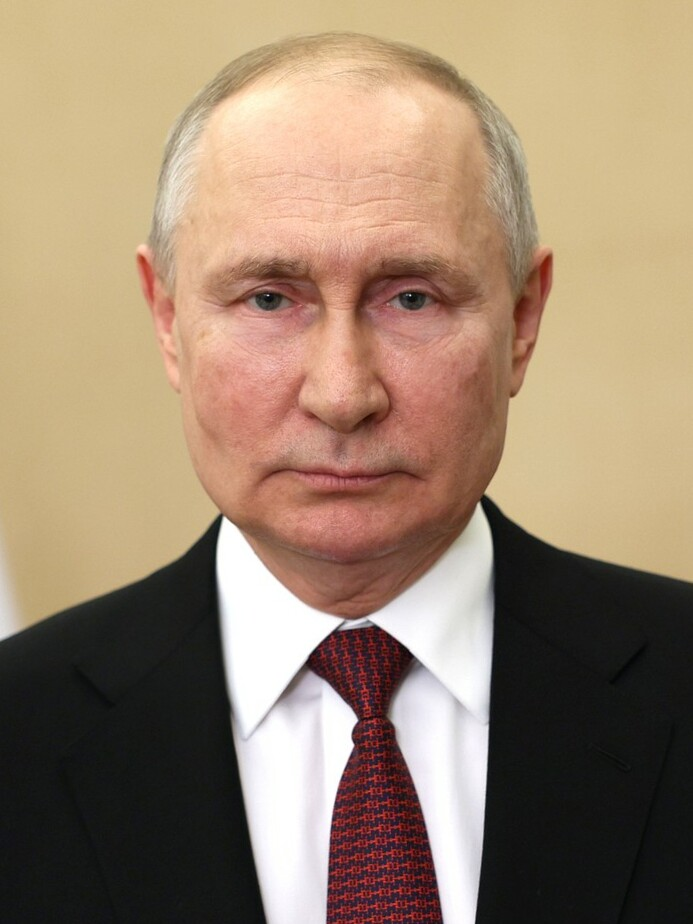
Russia
Vladimir Putin,
President

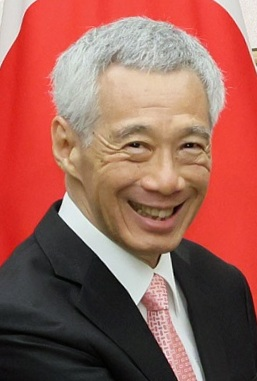
Singapore
Lee Hsien Loong,
Prime Minister

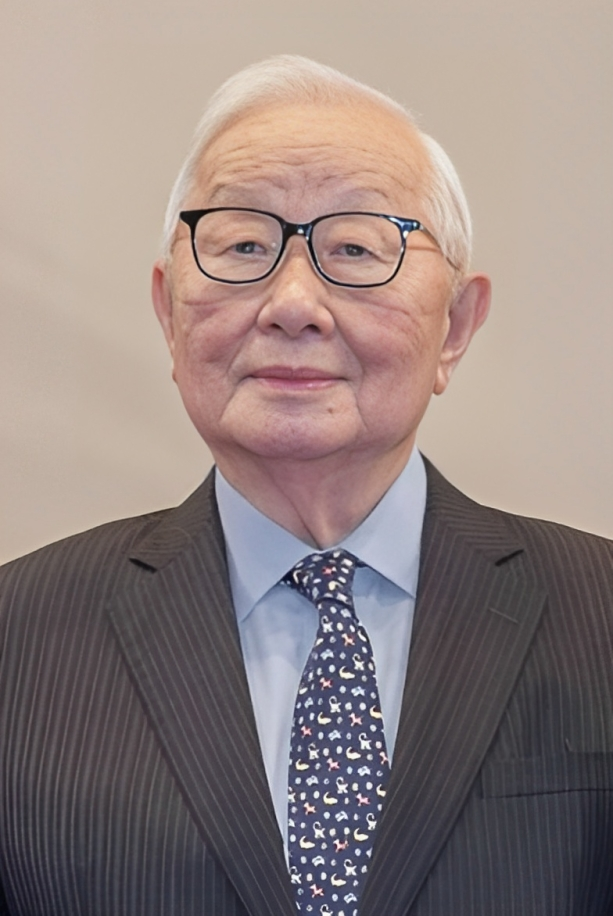
Taiwan
Morris Chang,
Special Representative of Leader (Note: Due to the complexities of the relations between it and the People's Republic of China, the Republic of China (ROC or "Taiwan") was not represented under its official name "Republic of China" or as "Taiwan". Instead, it participates in APEC under the name "Chinese Taipei". The president of the Republic of China does not attend the annual APEC Economic Leaders' Meeting in person. Instead, it was generally represented by a ministerial-level official responsible for economic affairs or someone designated by the president. See List of Chinese Taipei representatives to APEC.)
(representing President Tsai Ing-wen)

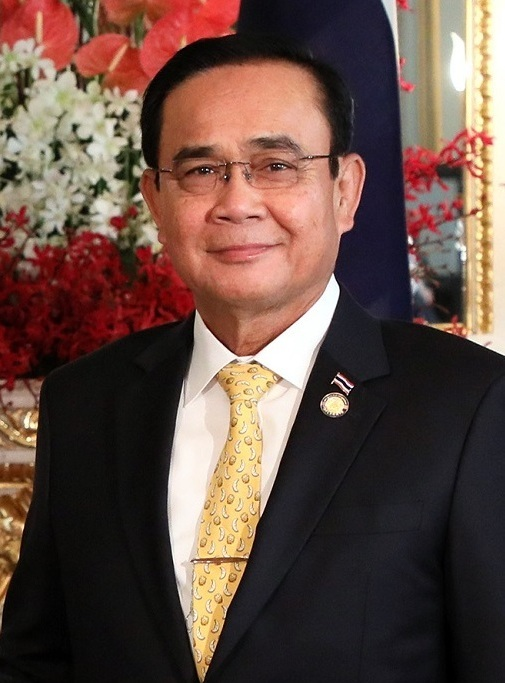
Thailand
Prayut Chan-o-cha,
Prime Minister

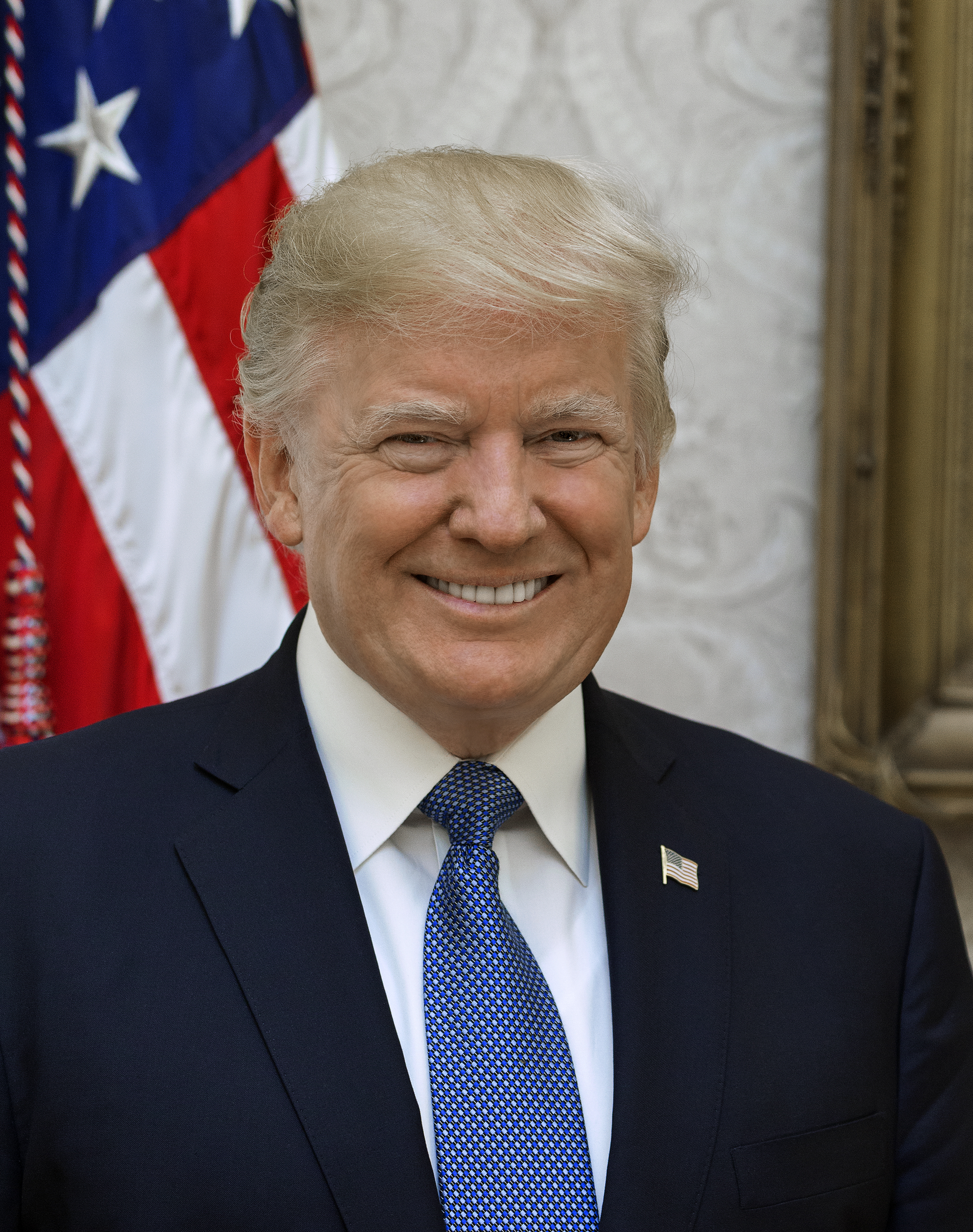
United States
Donald Trump,
President

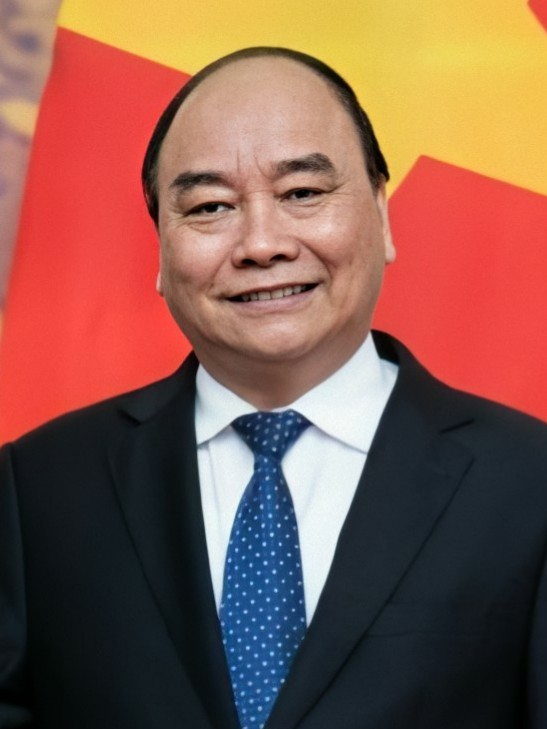
Vietnam*
Nguyễn Xuân Phúc,
Prime Minister

== See also ==
- 2020 G20 Riyadh summit in Riyadh, Saudi Arabia (held 21–22 November 2020)

| Preceded by APEC Chile 2019 | APEC meetings 2020 | Succeeded by APEC New Zealand 2021 |
