= 2nd federal electoral district of Nuevo León =

Federal electoral district of Mexico

Nuevo León's 2nd
- Electoral district of the Chamber of Deputies of Mexico

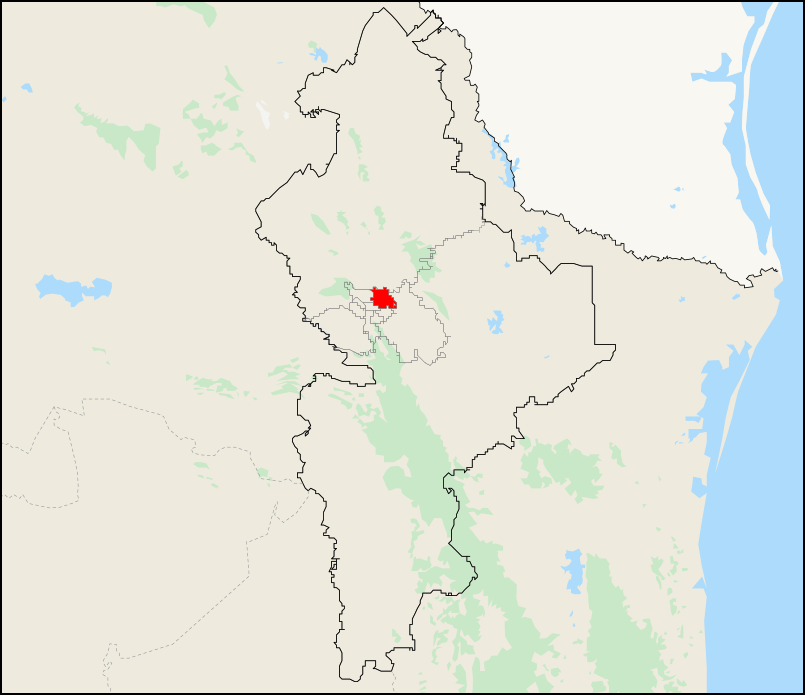

Incumbent
- Member: Andrés Cantú Ramírez
- Party: ▌Institutional Revolutionary Party
- Congress: 66th (2024–2027)

District
- State: Nuevo León
- Head town: Apodaca
- Coordinates: 25°47′N 100°11′W
- Covers: Apodaca (part)
- PR region: Second
- Precincts: 205
- Population: 448,173 (2020 census)

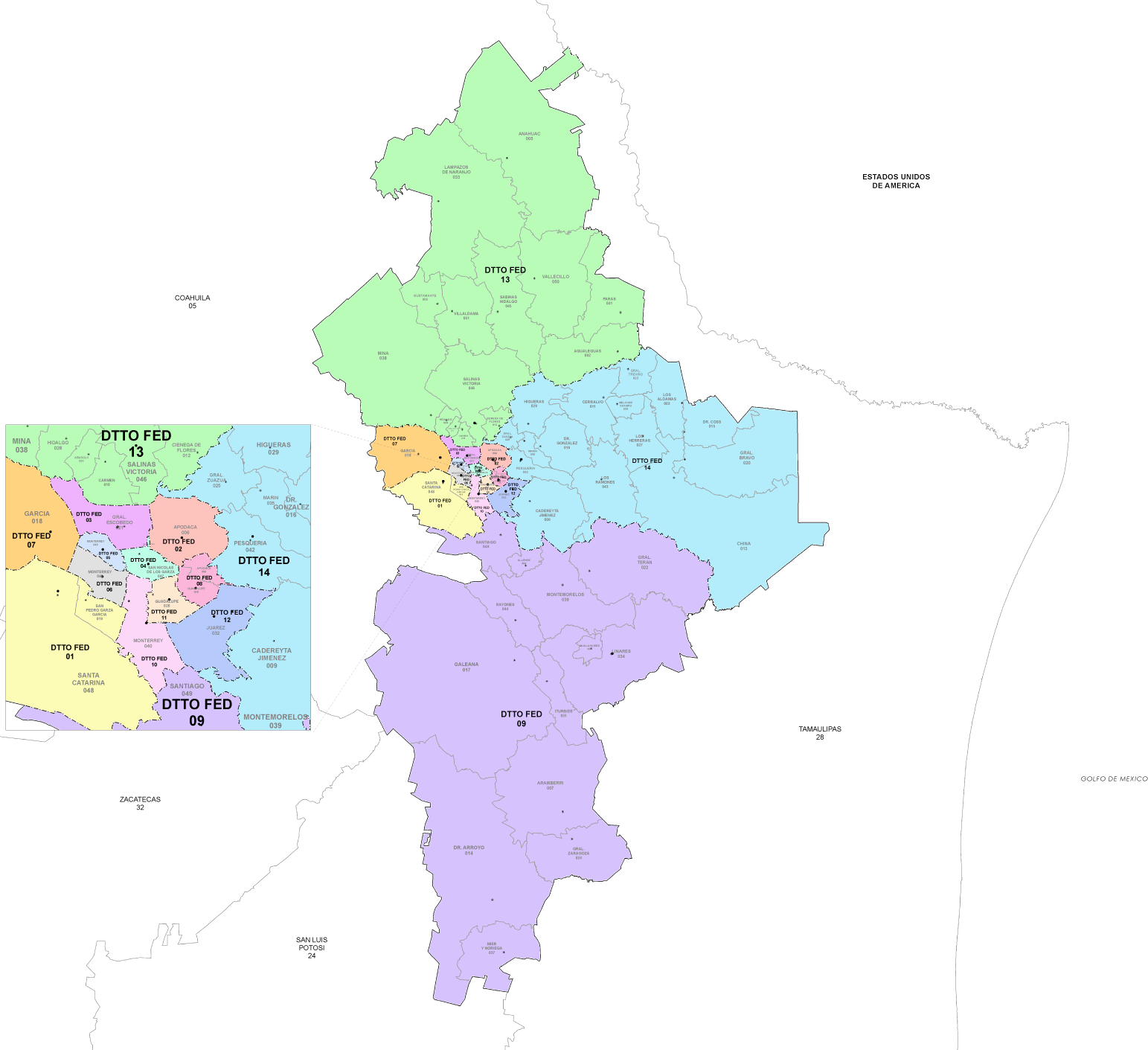
Nuevo León under the 2023 districting plan

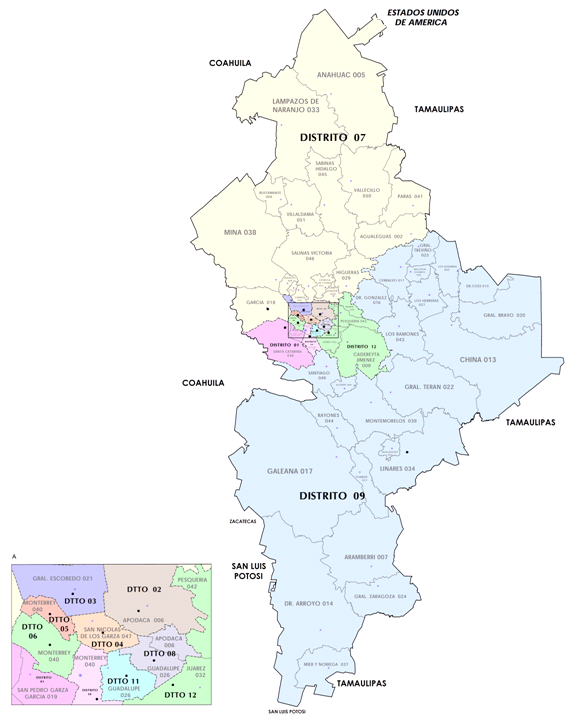
Nuevo León's districts in 2017–2022

The 2nd federal electoral district of Nuevo León (Spanish: Distrito electoral federal 02 de Nuevo León) is one of the 300 electoral districts into which Mexico is divided for elections to the federal Chamber of Deputies and one of 14 such districts in the state of Nuevo León.

It elects one deputy to the lower house of Congress for each three-year legislative session by means of the first-past-the-post system. Votes cast in the district also count towards the calculation of proportional representation ("plurinominal") deputies elected from the second region.

The current member for the district, re-elected in the 2024 general election, is Andrés Cantú Ramírez of the Institutional Revolutionary Party (PRI).

== District territory ==
Under the 2023 districting plan adopted by the National Electoral Institute (INE), which is to be used for the 2024, 2027 and 2030 federal elections, Nuevo León's congressional seat allocation rose from 12 to 14. The second district is in the north-eastern part of the Monterrey metropolitan area and covers 205 electoral precincts (secciones electorales) in the north of the municipality of Apodaca.

The district's head town (cabecera distrital), where results from individual polling stations are gathered together and tallied, is the city of Apodaca. The district reported a population of 448,173 in the 2020 census.

== Previous districting schemes ==
Evolution of electoral district numbers
	1974	1978	1996	2005	2017	2023
Nuevo León	7	11	11	12	12	14
Chamber of Deputies	196	300				

2017–2022

Between 2017 and 2022, the district covered 218 precincts in the municipality of Apodaca.

2005–2017

Under the 2005 districting plan, the district covered the municipality of Apodaca in its entirety (88 precincts).

1996–2005

From 1996 to 2005, the district's head town was at Apodaca but it covered a larger area in the north-east of the state, comprising 26 municipalities: Abasolo, Agualeguas, Los Aldamas, Apodaca, Cadereyta Jiménez, El Carmen, Cerralvo, Ciénega de Flores, China, Doctor Coss, Doctor González, General Bravo, General Treviño, General Zuazua, Los Herreras, Hidalgo, Higueras, Marín, Melchor Ocampo, Parás, Pesquería, Los Ramones, Sabinas Hidalgo, Salinas Victoria, Vallecillo and Villaldama.

1978–1996

The districting scheme in force from 1978 to 1996 was the result of the 1977 electoral reforms, which increased the number of single-member seats in the Chamber of Deputies from 196 to 300. Under that plan, Nuevo León's seat allocation rose from 7 to 11. The 2nd district's head town was the state capital, Monterrey, and it covered a portion of that city.

== Deputies returned to Congress ==
(Mexico) National parties
- Current
- PAN
- PRI
- PT
- PVEM
- MC
- Morena
- PAZ
- Somos
- Defunct or local only
- PLM
- PNR
- PRM
- PNM
- PP
- PPS
- PARM
- PFCRN
- CON
- PANAL
- PSD
- PES
- PES
- PRD

Nuevo León's 2nd district
Election	Deputy	Party	Term	Legislature
1916	Nicéforo Zambrano		1916–1917	Constituent Congress of Querétaro
...
1979	Juan Carlos Camacho Salinas	Institutional Revolutionary Party	1979–1982	51st Congress
1982	Juventino González Ramos	Institutional Revolutionary Party	1982–1985	52nd Congress
1985	Amilcar Aguilar Mendoza	Institutional Revolutionary Party	1985–1988	53rd Congress
1988	Luis Alberto Hinojosa Ochoa	Institutional Revolutionary Party	1988–1991	54th Congress
1991	José de Jesús Bazaldúa González	Institutional Revolutionary Party	1991–1994	55th Congress
1994	Fidel Pérez García	Institutional Revolutionary Party	1994–1997	56th Congress
1997	Lombardo Victoriano Guajardo Guajardo	Institutional Revolutionary Party	1997–2000	57th Congress
2000	Arturo Bonifacio de la Garza Tijerina	Institutional Revolutionary Party	2000–2003	58th Congress
2003	Humberto Cervantes Vega	Institutional Revolutionary Party	2003–2006	59th Congress
2006	Rodrigo Medina de la Cruz (Note: Medina de la Cruz requested an indefinite leave of absence from his seat on 11 July 2007. He was replaced for the remainder of his term by his alternate, De la Garza Treviño.); Jorge Luis de la Garza Treviño	Institutional Revolutionary Party	2006–2007; 2007–2009	60th Congress
2009	Ildefonso Guajardo Villarreal	Institutional Revolutionary Party	2009–2012	61st Congress
2012	Benito Caballero Garza	Institutional Revolutionary Party	2012–2015	62nd Congress
2015	Juan Manuel Cavazos Balderas	Institutional Revolutionary Party	2015–2018	63rd Congress
2018	María Guillermina Alvarado Moreno	National Regeneration Movement	2018–2021	64th Congress
2021	Andrés Mauricio Cantú Ramírez	Institutional Revolutionary Party	2021–2024	65th Congress
2024	Andrés Mauricio Cantú Ramírez	Institutional Revolutionary Party	2024–2027	66th Congress

== Presidential elections ==
Nuevo León's 2nd district
Election	District won by	Party or coalition	%
2018	Andrés Manuel López Obrador	Juntos Haremos Historia	39.5750
2024	Claudia Sheinbaum Pardo	Sigamos Haciendo Historia	47.3757
