= List of international prime ministerial trips made by Malcolm Turnbull =

This is a list of international prime ministerial trips made by Malcolm Turnbull, the 29th Prime Minister of Australia. During his time in office (15 September 2015 – 24 August 2018), Malcolm Turnbull made thirty-six international trips to twenty-two sovereign countries and territories.

== Summary ==
The number of visits per country are as follows:

- One: Federated States of Micronesia, Germany, India, Indonesia, Laos, Malaysia, Malta, Papua New Guinea, Peru, Samoa, Singapore, Turkey, United Kingdom, Vietnam
- Two: China, Iraq, New Zealand, Philippines
- Three or more: Afghanistan (3), France (3), Japan (3), United States (5)

== 2015 ==
Country	Locations	Dates	Details	Image
Indonesia	Jakarta	12 November	First overseas trip as Prime Minister. Met with President Joko Widodo to reset bilateral relations, focusing on trade and economic ties.	
Germany	Berlin	13 November	First European trip as Prime Minister. Met with Chancellor Angela Merkel. Discussed bilateral relations, trade, and received recommendations of the Australia–Germany Advisory Group.	
Turkey	Antalya	15–16 November	Attended the 2015 G20 Antalya summit. Held bilateral meetings including with Japanese Prime Minister Shinzō Abe.	
Philippines	Metro Manila	18–19 November	Attended APEC Philippines 2015. Held a bilateral meeting with US President Barack Obama.	
Malaysia	Kuala Lumpur	21–22 November	Attended the Tenth East Asia Summit.	
Malta	Valletta	27–29 November	Attended the 2015 Commonwealth Heads of Government Meeting. Met with Queen Elizabeth II.	
France	Paris	30 November	Attended the 2015 United Nations Climate Change Conference (COP21).	
Japan	Tokyo	18 December	Met with Prime Minister Shinzō Abe. Discussions focused on trade, cyber security, defense submarine bids, and Southern Ocean whaling.	

== 2016 ==
Country	Locations	Dates	Details	Image
Iraq	Baghdad, Taji	16–17 January	Unannounced troop visit. Met with Prime Minister Haider al-Abadi and Australian Defence Force personnel.	
Afghanistan	Kabul	17–18 January	Unannounced troop visit. Met with President Ashraf Ghani and Chief Executive Abdullah Abdullah.	
United States	Washington, D.C.	19 January	Working lunch and bilateral meeting with President Barack Obama at the White House.	
New Zealand	Auckland	19–20 February	Attended the annual Australia–New Zealand Leaders' Meeting with Prime Minister John Key. Announced a new pathway to Australian citizenship for Kiwi residents.	
United States	Washington, D.C.	31 March – 1 April	Attended the 2016 Nuclear Security Summit.	
China	Beijing, Shanghai	14–15 April	First official visit to China as Prime Minister. Met with President Xi Jinping and Premier Li Keqiang. Attended Australia Week in China.	
China	Hangzhou	4–5 September	Attended the 2016 G20 Hangzhou summit. Met with President Xi Jinping.	
Laos	Vientiane	6–8 September	Attended the Eleventh East Asia Summit and ASEAN-related meetings.	
Federated States of Micronesia	Pohnpei	8–10 September	Attended the 47th Pacific Islands Forum.	
United States	New York City	19–20 September	Attended the general debate of the seventy-first session of the United Nations General Assembly. Met with President Barack Obama.	
Peru	Lima	19–20 November	Attended APEC Peru 2016.	

== 2017 ==
Country	Locations	Dates	Details	Image
New Zealand	Queenstown	17 February	Attended the annual Australia–New Zealand Leaders' Meeting with Prime Minister Bill English.	
Papua New Guinea	Port Moresby, Kokoda Track	8–9 April	Official visit. Met with Prime Minister Peter O'Neill and walked part of the Kokoda Track ahead of ANZAC Day.	
India	New Delhi	10–13 April	State visit. Met with Prime Minister Narendra Modi. Discussions focused on trade, defence, education and energy cooperation.	
Iraq	Baghdad	23 April	Unannounced ANZAC Day visit to Australian forces in Iraq. Met with Prime Minister Haider al-Abadi.	
Afghanistan	Kabul, Gamberi	24 April	Unannounced ANZAC Day visit to ADF troops stationed in Afghanistan. Met with President Ashraf Ghani.	
United States	New York City	4 May	Met with President Donald Trump aboard the USS Intrepid.	
Singapore	Singapore	2–3 June	Keynote speaker at the Shangri-La Dialogue security summit. Met with Prime Minister Lee Hsien Loong.	
Germany	Hamburg	7–8 July	Attended the 2017 G20 Hamburg summit.	
France	Paris, Cherbourg	8–9 July	Met with President Emmanuel Macron at the Élysée Palace and visited naval shipyards in Cherbourg regarding Australia's submarine program.	
Samoa	Apia	5–8 September	Attended the 48th Pacific Islands Forum.	
United States	New York City	18–20 September	Attended the general debate of the seventy-second session of the United Nations General Assembly.	
Vietnam	Đà Nẵng	10–11 November	Attended APEC Vietnam 2017. Elevated Australia–Vietnam relations to a Strategic Partnership.	
Philippines	Pasay	13–14 November	Attended the Twelfth East Asia Summit. Held trilateral meeting with US President Donald Trump and Japanese Prime Minister Shinzō Abe.	

== 2018 ==
Country	Locations	Dates	Details	Image
Japan	Tokyo	18 January	Special Strategic Partnership meeting with Prime Minister Shinzō Abe. Visited military bases and focused on security cooperation.	
United States	Washington, D.C.	21–24 February	Official working visit. Met with President Donald Trump at the White House. Discussed North Korea, trade, energy and the Australia–US alliance. Delivered keynote address to the National Governors Association.	
United Kingdom	London	18–20 April	Attended the Commonwealth Heads of Government Meeting 2018. Met with Prime Minister Theresa May at Chequers.	
France	Villers-Bretonneux	24–25 April	Opened the Sir John Monash Centre alongside French Prime Minister Édouard Philippe for the ANZAC Day Centenary.	
Afghanistan	Kabul	26 April	Unannounced visit to Australian troops following ANZAC Day services in France.	

== Multilateral meetings ==
Malcolm Turnbull attended the following summits during his prime ministership:

Group	Year			
Group	2015	2016	2017	2018
UNGA	September, (United States) New York City	19–20 September, (United States) New York City	18–20 September, (United States) New York City	
APEC	18–19 November (Philippines) Manila	19–20 November (Peru) Lima	10–11 November (Vietnam) Đà Nẵng	
EAS (ASEAN)	21–22 November (Malaysia) Kuala Lumpur	6–8 September (Laos) Vientiane	13–14 November (Philippines) Pasay	
G20	15–16 November, (Turkey) Antalya	4–5 September, (China) Hangzhou	7–8 July, (Germany) Hamburg	
CHOGM	27–29 November, (Malta) Valletta	none	none	18–20 April, (United Kingdom) London
NSS	none	31 March – 1 April, (United States) Washington, D.C.	none	none
PIF		8–10 September, (Federated States of Micronesia) Pohnpei	5–8 September, (Samoa) Apia	
██ = Did not attend

== See also ==
- Foreign relations of Australia
- Turnbull government
- List of international prime ministerial trips made by Tony Abbott, his predecessor
- List of international prime ministerial trips made by Scott Morrison, his successor
