= Graciela Márquez Colín =

Mexican politician

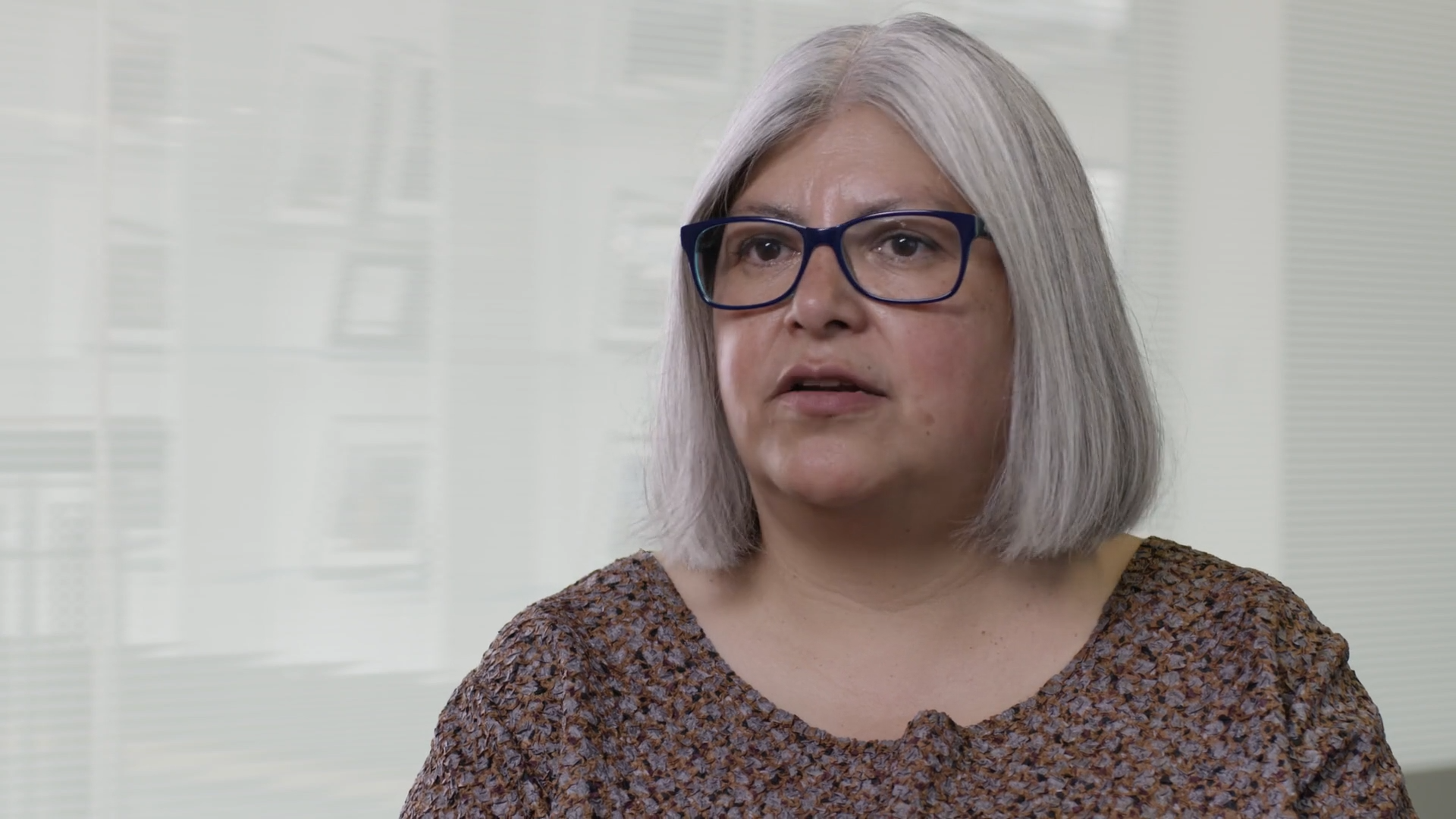

Secretary of Economy
- In office 1 December 2018 – 31 December 2020
- President: Andrés Manuel López Obrador
- Preceded by: Ildefonso Guajardo Villarreal
- Succeeded by: Tatiana Clouthier

Personal details
- Education: National Autonomous University of Mexico (BA); El Colegio de Mexico (MA); Harvard University (PhD)
- Occupation: Academic

Graciela Márquez Colín is a Mexican academic and economist. She held the position of Mexican Minister of Economy from 2018–2020, under President Andrés Manuel López Obrador. As of January 2021, she holds the position of Vice President of the Governing Board of the National Institute of Statistics and Geography (INEGI). She is set to occupy this role for an eight-year term, until December 2028. Previously she was Professor of Economic History at the El Colegio de Mexico in Mexico City where she was a full professor at the Centro de Estudios Historicos. She was also a visiting professor at the University of Chicago.

In 2002 she received her Ph.D. from Harvard University in Economic History. Her Ph.D. dissertation was titled "The Political Economy of Mexican Protectionism, 1868-1911" and was awarded the Gershenkron Prize in 2002 by the Economic History Association. She is an expert in the areas of economic history, protectionism, fiscal policies, and the economics of contemporary Mexico.

She obtained a Bachelor's Degree in Economics from the National Autonomous University of Mexico (UNAM) and her master's degree from The College of Mexico A.C. (El Colegio de Mexico, A.C.). She has been a board member of Pemex (Petróleos Mexicanos) since 2019.

She belongs to the Mexican National System of Researchers and is the author of several articles on trade policy, industrialization, inequality and economic development. She also coedited a book titled The Decline of Latin American Economies: Growth, Institutions, and Crises, which was published by the University of Chicago Press and appeared in the National Bureau of Economic Research Conference Report in 2007.

Her husband is Banxico's deputy governor Gerardo Esquivel.
