= Arturo de la Garza Tijerina =

Mexican politician

Arturo Bonifacio de la Garza Tijerina
- Born: 12 July 1958 (age 67); Monterrey, Nuevo León, Mexico
- Occupation: Politician
- Political party: PRI
- Relatives: Arturo de la Garza González (father)

Arturo Bonifacio de la Garza Tijerina (born 12 July 1958) is a Mexican politician from the Institutional Revolutionary Party (PRI). From 1997 to 2000 served as a deputy during the 58th session of Congress of Nuevo León and, in the 2000 general election he was elected to the Chamber of Deputies to represent Nuevo León's 2nd district during the 58th session of Congress.
