= 51st Pacific Islands Forum =

International relations conference

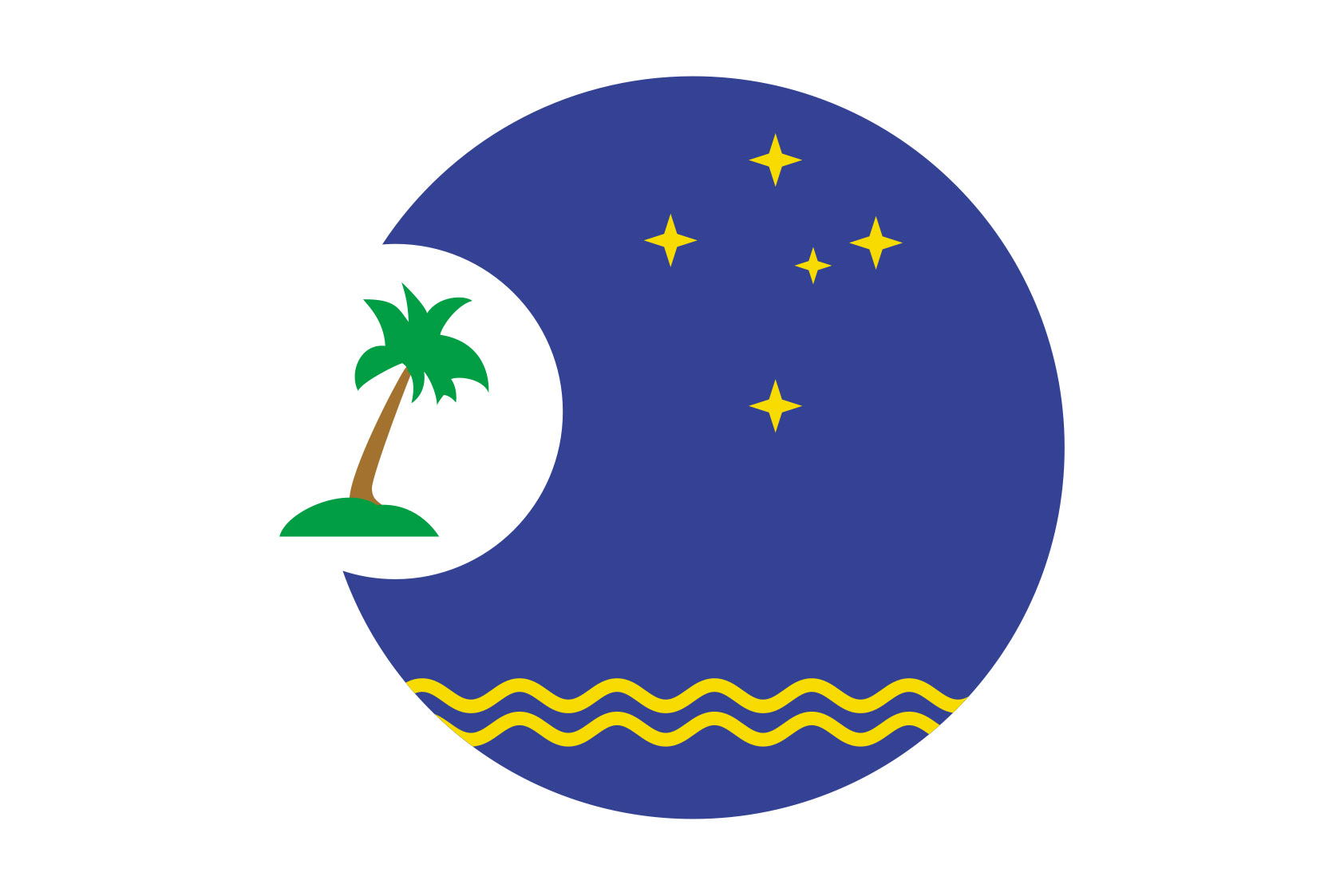
- Host country: Fiji
- Dates: 11–14 July 2022
- Cities: Suva
- Venues: PIF Secretariat; Grand Pacific Hotel
- Participants: 17 states (Note: Leaders of the Cook Islands, French Polynesia, Marshall Islands, Nauru and Tuvalu did not attend the Forum and sent their respective cabinet ministers instead.): Australia; Cook Islands; Fiji; French Polynesia; Marshall Islands; Micronesia; Nauru; New Caledonia; New Zealand; Niue; Palau; Papua New Guinea; Samoa; Solomon Islands; Tonga; Tuvalu; Vanuatu
- Chair: Frank Bainimarama
- Website: forumsec.org

Key points

The 51st Pacific Islands Forum was a meeting of the heads of state and heads of government of the Pacific Islands Forum (PIF), which was held in Suva, Fiji from 11 to 14 July 2022. The meeting was chaired by the Prime Minister of Fiji, Frank Banimarama.

The meeting led up to the launch of the 2050 Strategy for the Blue Pacific Continent.

== Background ==
The meeting was originally scheduled for 4–7 August 2020 but was postponed to 2021 due to the COVID-19 pandemic, before it was further shifted to its current July 2022 date. A high-level political dialogue was held earlier on 7 June 2022 between several Pacific Island countries which addressed China's economic and security deal and the PIF leadership crisis. Work to reunite the Forum were to formally conclude during the meeting. Increased geopolitical tensions between the United States and China also saw a surge of diplomatic visits to Fiji and the Forum. The Forum Foreign Ministers meetings which precedes the 51st Pacific Islands Forum was held on 8 July 2022.

== Issues ==
Several issues were discussed during the meeting including the climate crisis. The Forum also recognized the escalating geopolitical competition between China and the United States and its allies in the Pacific region.

1. Climate crisis.
2. Geopolitical tensions.
3. Mending the PIF leadership rift.
4. Covid-19 recovery.
5. Protecting the ocean.
6. Vanuatu's ICJAO bid. (Note: The Government of Vanuatu were seeking the endorsement of the Forum leaders to seek an advisory opinion on climate change from the International Court of Justice.)

== Participants ==
Prime Minister of Australia Anthony Albanese and Prime Minister of New Zealand Jacinda Ardern, heads of government of the two largest participating countries in the Forum attended the meeting. The United States, China and dialogue partners of the Forum were excluded from attending the meeting to ensure that "Pacific leaders had space to resolve issues and decide on their key priorities without having to simultaneously navigate meetings with powerful outside players jostling for influence". Nevertheless, Vice President of the United States Kamala Harris addressed the Forum virtually on 13 July 2022 which was seen as a blow to China which was not granted the same privilege.

=== Participating leaders ===
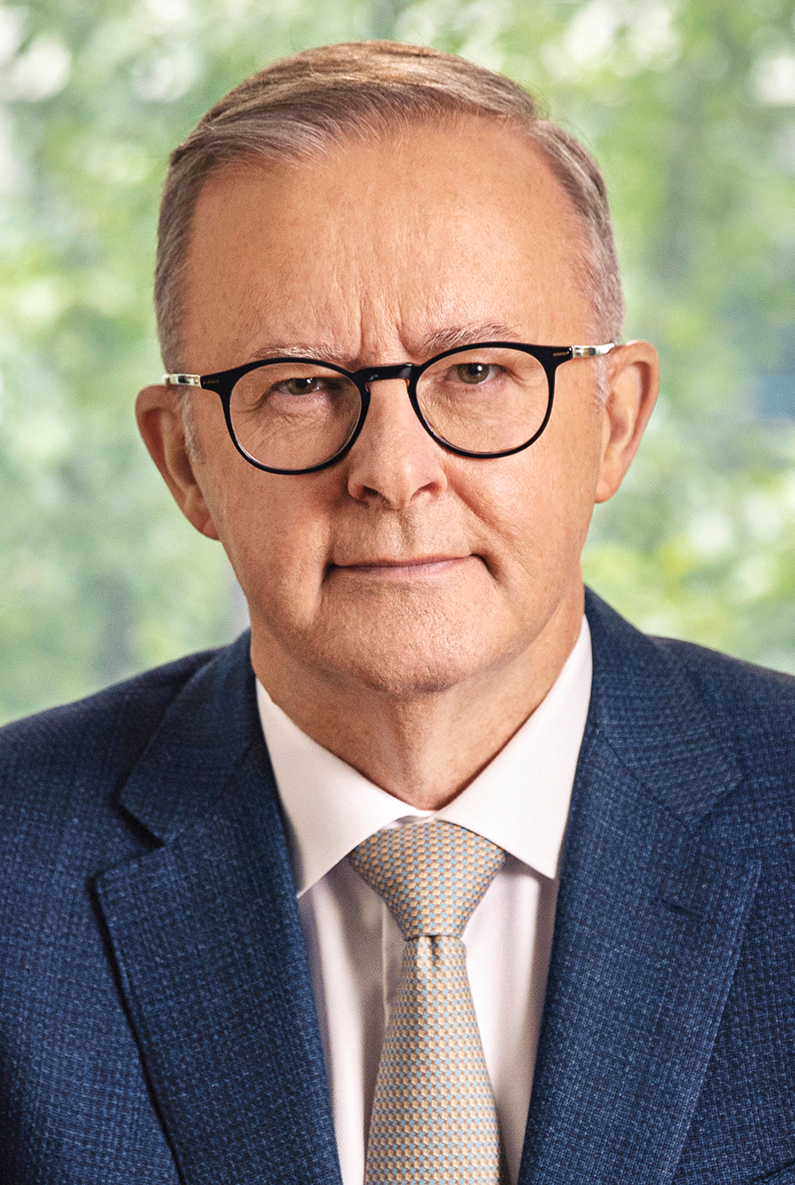
Australia
Anthony Albanese, Prime Minister

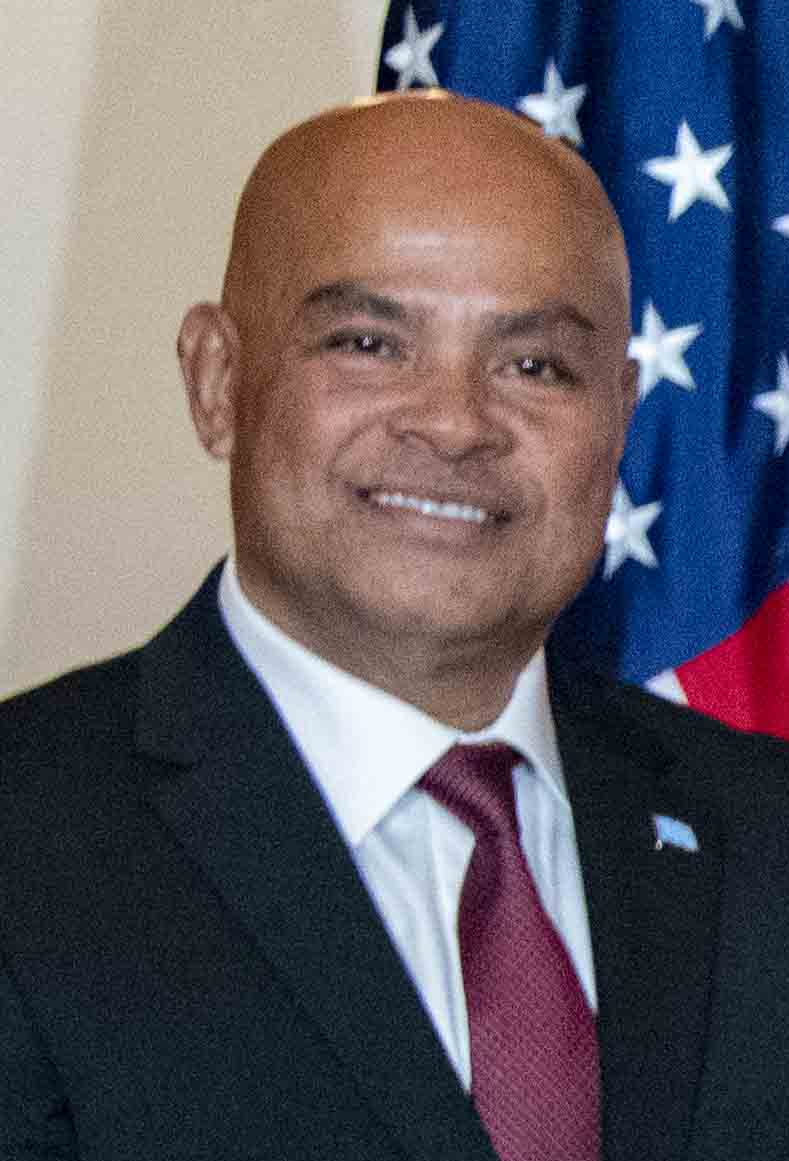
Federated States of Micronesia
David Panuelo, President

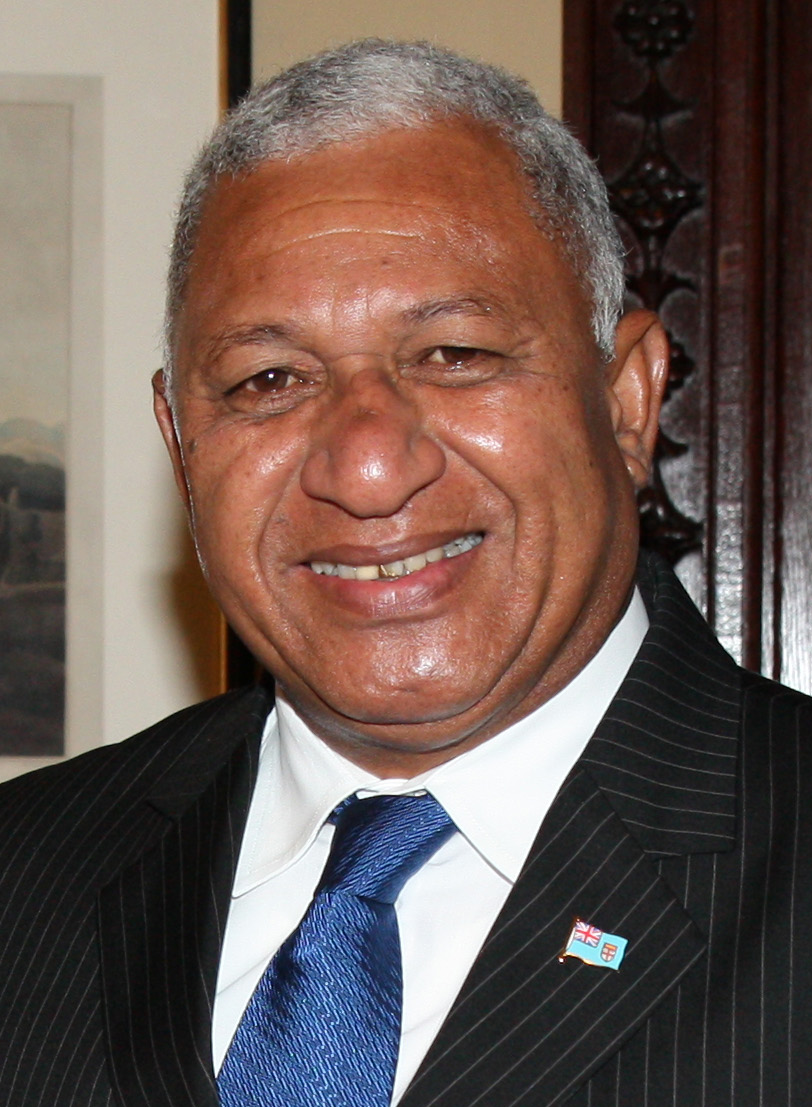
Fiji
Frank Bainimarama, Prime Minister (Host)

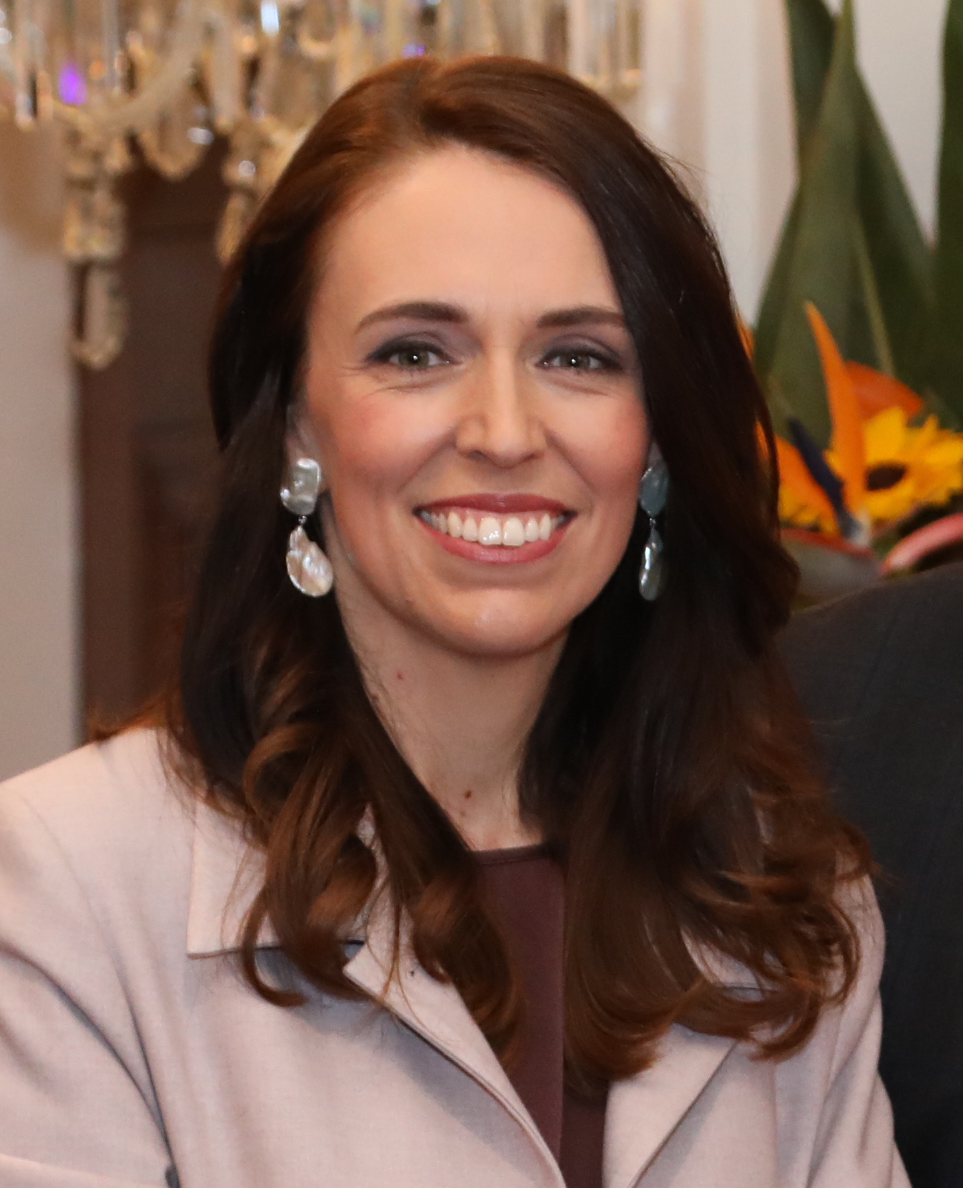
New Zealand
Jacinda Ardern, Prime Minister

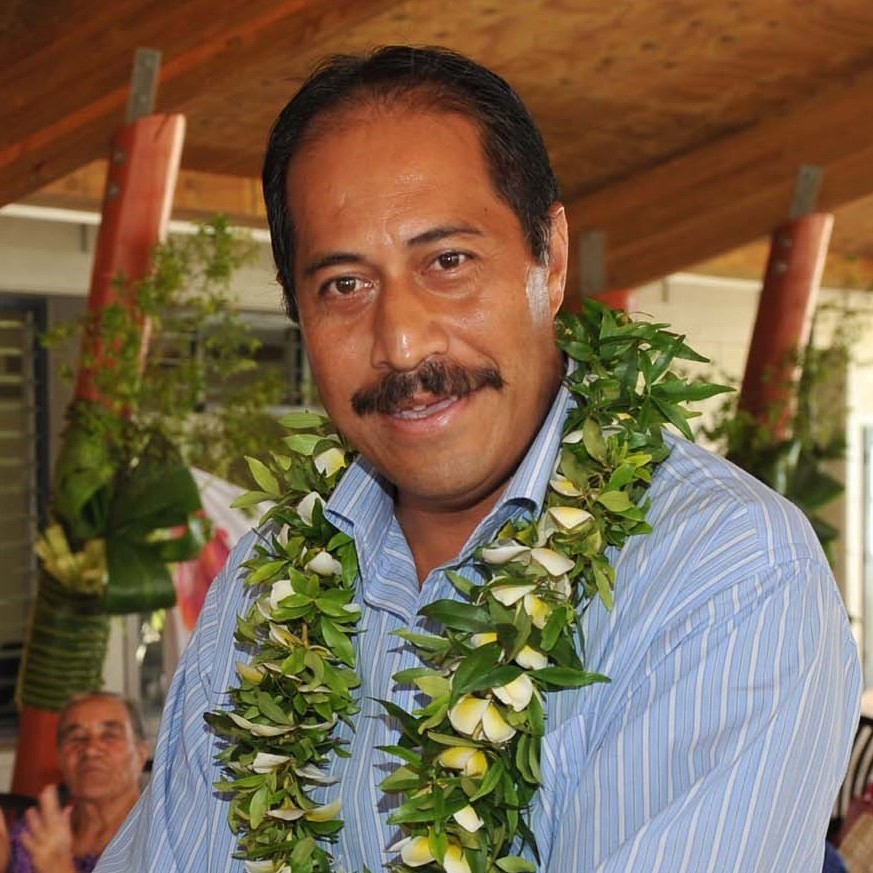
Niue
Dalton Tagelagi, Premier

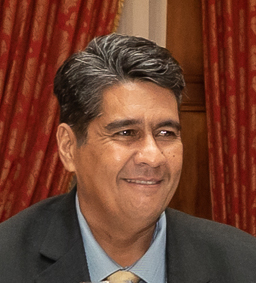
Palau
Surangel Whipps Jr., President

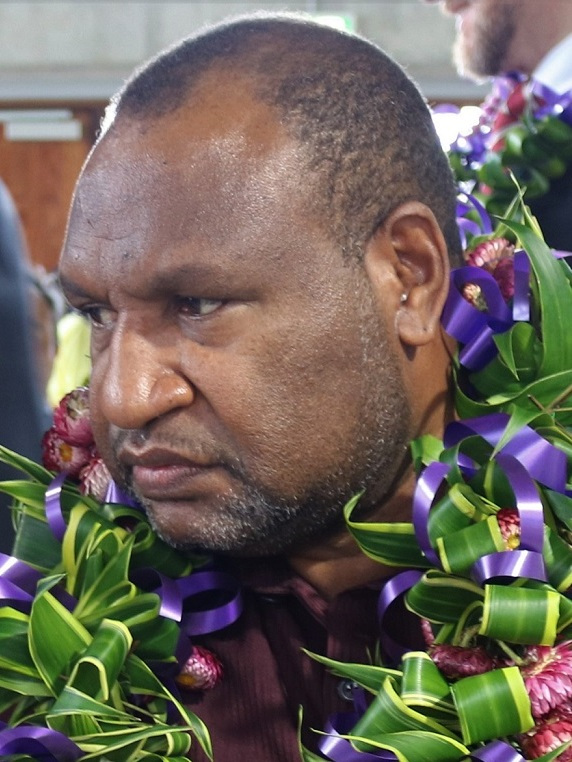
Papua New Guinea
James Marape, Prime Minister

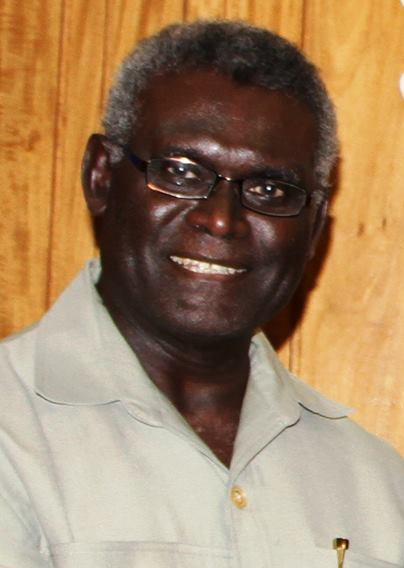
Solomon Islands
Manasseh Sogavare, Prime Minister

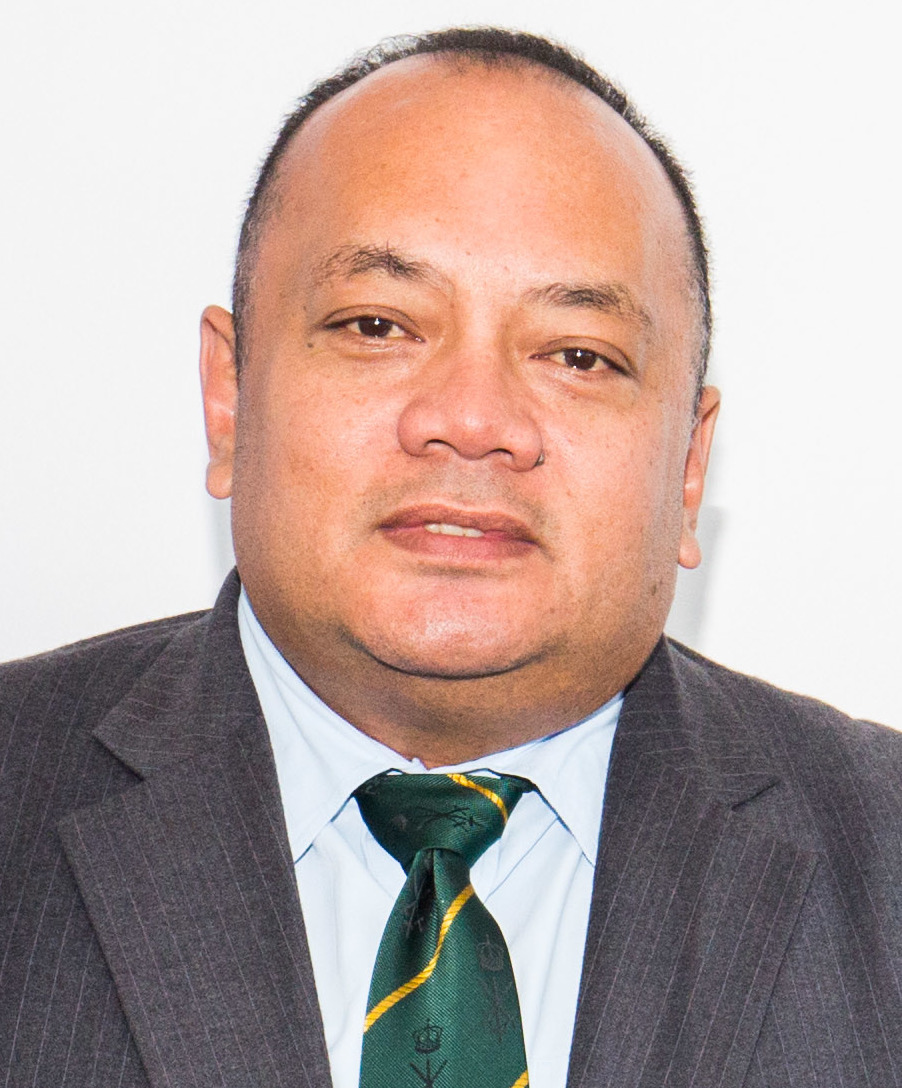
Tonga
Siaosi Sovaleni, Prime Minister

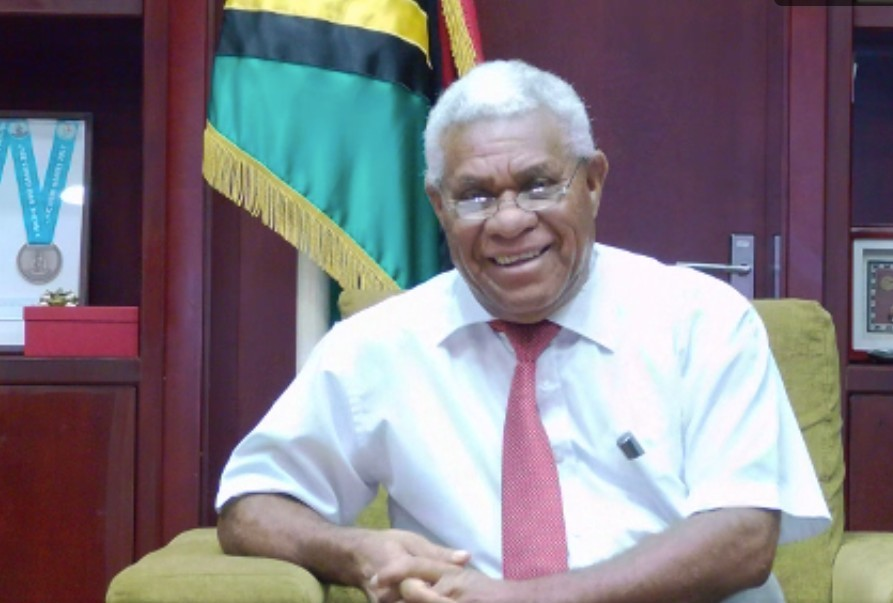
Vanuatu
Bob Loughman, Prime Minister

=== Absent leaders ===
On 9 July 2022, President of Kiribati Taneti Maamau confirmed that his country has withdrawn from the Pacific Islands Forum "with immediate effect" and therefore will not be participating in the meeting. President of the Marshall Islands David Kabua could not attend the meeting because of a "legislatively-binding action" to terminate the country's membership in the Forum. Prime Minister of the Cook Islands Mark Brown also pulled out to focus on the election while President of Nauru Lionel Aingimea could not attend due to the ongoing COVID-19 pandemic in Nauru.

== Results ==
The Forum leaders endorsed the 2050 Strategy for the Blue Pacific Continent. The strategy outlined ten commitments across seven focus areas which is important for sustainable development:

1. Political leadership and regionalism.
2. People-centered development.
3. Peace and security.
4. Resource and economic development.
5. Climate change and disasters.
6. Ocean and environment.
7. Technology and connectivity.
