= List of international presidential trips made by Bongbong Marcos =

Visits to foreign countries by the 17th Philippine president

According to the Official Gazette, international trips made by the President of the Philippines are an opportunity to "foster and maintain" relations with other governments and to meet other heads of state and/or government. The Department of Foreign Affairs and the Office of the President classify these trips as either a state visit, an official visit, or a working visit.

Bongbong Marcos, the 17th and current president, has made 44 international trips to 25 countries during his presidency so far, which began on June 30, 2022. More trips have been planned.

Unless otherwise stated, the President was accompanied by First Lady Liza Araneta Marcos on all of his trips. His first cousin, then-House Speaker and Leyte's 1st district representative Martin Romualdez, joined most of his trips as well during his tenure as House Speaker, while the President and the First Lady's eldest son, Ilocos Norte's 1st district representative Sandro Marcos, joined some.

== Summary ==
The number of visits per country where President Marcos traveled are:

- One: Belgium, Canada, the Czech Republic, Germany, Italy, Laos, Russia, Saudi Arabia, South Korea, Switzerland, Thailand, the United Kingdom, Vatican City, and Vietnam
- Two: Australia, Brunei, Cambodia, China, India, and the United Arab Emirates
- Three: Malaysia
- Four: Indonesia and Japan
- Six: Singapore and the United States

Map of international trips made by Bongbong Marcos as president, as of November 2026: One visit Two visits Three visits Four visits Five visits Six visits Philippines

== 2022 ==
	Country	Areas visited	Dates	Details	Image
1	Indonesia	Jakarta, Bogor	September 4–6	State visit. President Marcos met with members of the local Filipino community at the Hotel Fairmont Jakarta. On September 5, he laid a wreath at the Kalibata Heroes' Cemetery before meeting with President Joko Widodo and First Lady Iriana at the Bogor Palace. The Marcos family also visited Sarinah with President Widodo.	
1	Singapore	Central Area	September 6–7	State visit. President Marcos met with the local Filipino community at the National University of Singapore. On September 7, he met with President Halimah Yacob and Prime Minister Lee Hsien Loong at the Istana. President Marcos and First Lady Liza Araneta Marcos toured the Singapore Botanic Gardens, where a Dendrobium was named after them as part of a diplomatic tradition. Prime Minister Lee and his wife Ho Ching hosted the Filipino first family to breakfast at the Shangri-La Hotel, where they stayed. At the hotel, the President also joined a roundtable discussion and an economic briefing with potential Singaporean investors.	
2	United States	Newark, New York City	September 18–24	Working visit. President Marcos and his delegation met with the Filipino community at the New Jersey Performing Arts Center in Newark. On September 19, they rang the closing bell of the New York Stock Exchange, where the President spoke to and met with American senior executives. On September 20, he addressed the general debate of the 77th session of the United Nations General Assembly. On the sidelines of the UN general assembly, President Marcos met separately with United States President Joe Biden, United Nations Secretary-General António Guterres, Japanese prime minister Fumio Kishida, former British prime minister Tony Blair, and World Bank President David Malpass. He also met with members of the United States Chamber of Commerce and the US-ASEAN Business Council.	
3	Singapore	Central Area	October 1–3	Unannounced official visit. President Marcos attended the 2022 Singapore Grand Prix at the Marina Bay Street Circuit. The President and the First Lady met informally with Prime Minister Lee Hsien Loong at the circuit.	
4	Cambodia	Phnom Penh	November 9–13	Working visit. President Marcos attended the 40th and 41st ASEAN Summits and the related summits. On November 10, he joined the ASEAN leaders in an audience with King Norodom Sihamoni at the Royal Palace. Throughout the sidelines of the summits, the President held bilateral meetings with Cambodian prime minister Hun Sen, Canadian prime minister Justin Trudeau, Vietnamese prime minister Phạm Minh Chính, Brunei Sultan Hassanal Bolkiah and South Korean President Yoon Suk-yeol. He met with the local Filipino community at Hyatt Regency Phnom Penh.	
5	Thailand	Bangkok	November 16–19	Working visit. President Marcos attended the Asia-Pacific Economic Cooperation Summit and he addressed at the APEC CEO Summit. President Marcos held bilateral meetings with Chinese leader Xi Jinping, French President Emmanuel Macron, Saudi Arabia prime minister Mohammed bin Salman, New Zealand Prime Minister Jacinda Ardern, and Australian prime minister Anthony Albanese. He had an audience with King Maha Vajiralongkorn and Queen Suthida at Chakri Maha Prasat Throne Hall and also met with local Filipino community at Bangkok Marriott Marquis Queen's Park.	
6	Belgium	Brussels, Schaerbeek	December 12–14	Working visit. President Marcos attended the ASEAN–European Union Commemorative Summit at the Berlaymont building in Brussels. He had an audience with King Philippe at the Royal Palace. The President also met with Dutch prime minister Mark Rutte, Estonian prime minister Kaja Kallas, Czech prime minister Petr Fiala, and Spanish prime minister Pedro Sánchez, as well as EU Council President Charles Michel and EU Commission President Ursula von der Leyen. In Schaerbeek, President Marcos met with Overseas Filipinos based in Europe.	

== 2023 ==
	Country	Areas visited	Dates	Details	Image
7	China	Beijing	January 3–6	State visit. President Marcos and First Lady Liza Araneta Marcos met with CCP General Secretary and President Xi Jinping and his wife Peng Liyuan at the Great Hall of the People, with a state banquet being organized in their honor. The President also met with Premier Li Keqiang and Chairman of the Standing Committee of the National People's Congress Li Zhanshu separately. The President's sister, Senator Imee Marcos, who chairs the Senate Committee on Foreign Relations, joined his delegation on this trip. Unlike in most of their other visits, President Marcos and his delegation did not meet with the Filipino community there due to restrictions imposed during the COVID-19 pandemic.	
8	Switzerland	Davos, Zürich	January 15–20	Working visit. Arriving via Zurich Airport, President Marcos participated in the World Economic Forum in Davos, of which he met EU Commission President Ursula von der Leyen and Swiss President Alain Berset. The presidential delegation for this trip consisted of more than 70 individuals, including businesspeople Ramon Ang, Lance Gokongwei, Enrique Razon, Teresita Sy-Coson, and Jaime Augusto Zobel de Ayala, and Senator Mark Villar, chairperson of the Senate committees on trade and banking. The First Family met with the Filipino community in Zürich before departing Switzerland.	
9	Japan	Tokyo	February 8–12	Working visit. President Marcos and First Lady Liza Araneta Marcos met with Prime Minister Fumio Kishida and held an audience with Emperor Naruhito and Empress Masako at the Imperial Palace. The President also addressed Japanese executives at the Philippine Business Opportunities Forum at the Palace Hotel. Before leaving Japan, the First Family met with the local Filipino community at the Belle Salle hotel.	
10	United States	Washington, D.C., Arlington County, Prince George's County	April 30 – May 4	Official visit. Arriving via Joint Base Andrews in Prince George's County, Maryland, President Marcos and First Lady Liza Araneta Marcos met with President Joe Biden and First Lady Jill Biden at the White House on May 1. The First Couple were hosted to a brunch by Vice President Kamala Harris and Second Gentleman Doug Emhoff at Number One Observatory Circle on May 2. On May 3, President Marcos met with Defense Secretary Lloyd Austin at the Pentagon, where he received full military honors, making Marcos the first visiting head of state to receive such honors under the Biden administration. The presidential delegation, consisting of several cabinet members and business executives, met with various members of the US-ASEAN Business Council and the U.S. Senate Committee on Foreign Relations. They also met with the local Filipino community there. Before departing the U.S., the President laid a wreath at the Tomb of the Unknown Soldier in Arlington National Cemetery.	
10	United Kingdom	London	May 5–6	Official visit. Arriving via Gatwick Airport, which they had toured, President Marcos and First Lady Liza Araneta Marcos attended the coronation of King Charles III and Queen Camilla at Westminster Abbey on May 6. They attended a reception at Buckingham Palace that the King hosted the previous day. President Marcos said that he also met briefly with Prime Minister Rishi Sunak.	
11	Indonesia	Labuan Bajo	May 9–11	Working visit. President Marcos attended the 42nd ASEAN Summit. The President also held separate bilateral meetings with Laotian prime minister Sonexay Siphandone, Timorese prime minister Taur Matan Ruak, and Vietnamese prime minister Phạm Minh Chính.	
12	Malaysia	Kuala Lumpur, Putrajaya	July 25–27	State visit. President Marcos and First Lady Liza Araneta Marcos met with King Abdullah and Prime Minister Anwar Ibrahim.	
13	Indonesia	Jakarta	September 4–7	Working visit. President Marcos attended the 43rd ASEAN Summit, the Eighteenth East Asia Summit, and other related meetings. The President also met separately with Cambodian prime minister Hun Manet, Canadian prime minister Justin Trudeau, Cook Islands prime minister Mark Brown, South Korean President Yoon Suk Yeol, and Vietnamese prime minister Phạm Minh Chính.	
14	Singapore	Central Area	September 13–17	Working visit. On his 66th birthday, President Marcos addressed the Milken Institute's Asia Summit. He also attended the 2023 Singapore Grand Prix from September 15 to 17 upon the invitation of Prime Minister Lee Hsien Loong.	
15	Saudi Arabia	Riyadh	October 19–21	Official visit. President Marcos attended the first ASEAN–Gulf Cooperation Council Summit. On the sidelines of the summit, he met with Crown Prince and Prime Minister Mohammed bin Salman and the Crown Prince of Kuwait Mishal Al-Ahmad Al-Jaber Al-Sabah. He also met with the local Filipino community and various investors to tout the Maharlika Investment Fund. First Lady Liza Araneta Marcos did not join this trip.	
16	United States	San Francisco, Los Angeles, Honolulu	November 15–19	Working visit. President Marcos attended the APEC Economic Leaders' Meeting in San Francisco. He met bilaterally with Chinese leader Xi Jinping, Peruvian President Dina Boluarte, and U.S. Vice President Kamala Harris. In the Greater Los Angeles area, the President toured the SpaceX headquarters. In Hawaii, Marcos visited the United States Indo-Pacific Command and laid a wreath at the USS Arizona Memorial at Pearl Harbor. Throughout this trip, the President met with several business leaders and groups, as well as the local Filipino communities in each city he visited.	
17	Japan	Tokyo	December 15–18	Working visit. President Marcos attended the ASEAN–Japan Friendship and Cooperation Commemorative Summit at Hotel Okura.	

== 2024 ==
	Country	Areas visited	Dates	Details	Image
18	Brunei	Bandar Seri Begawan	January 13–14	President Marcos and First Lady Liza Araneta Marcos attended the wedding reception of Prince Abdul Mateen and Anisha Rosnah at the invitation of Sultan Hassanal Bolkiah.	
19	Vietnam	Hanoi	January 29–30	State visit. President Marcos and First Lady Liza Araneta Marcos met with President Võ Văn Thưởng, Prime Minister Phạm Minh Chính, and National Assembly Chairman Vương Đình Huệ. President Thưởng hosted the Marcos couple to a state banquet, while Prime Minister Chính hosted President Marcos to a working luncheon with business leaders. The Philippine president met with leaders of the conglomerate Vingroup. The Marcoses laid wreaths at the Memorial to the Revolutionary Martyrs and the Ho Chi Minh Mausoleum. The two presidents toured the Imperial Citadel of Thăng Long.	
20	Australia	Canberra	February 28–29	Official, guest of government visit. President Marcos and First Lady Liza Araneta Marcos met with Governor-General David Hurley and Prime Minister Anthony Albanese. The President addressed a joint session of the Parliament of Australia, becoming the first Philippine president and the 17th different head of state or government to do so. Before departing Canberra, the President and the First Lady laid a wreath at the Australian War Memorial.	
21	Australia	Melbourne	March 3–6	President Marcos attended the ASEAN–Australia Special Summit from March 4 to 6.	
22	Germany	Berlin	March 11–13	Working visit. President Marcos met with German Chancellor Olaf Scholz; and on the sidelines of the visit, the President and his delegation met with German business executives.	
22	Czech Republic	Prague	March 13–16	State visit. President Marcos and First Lady Liza Araneta Marcos met with Czech President Petr Pavel, First Lady Eva Pavlová, Prime Minister Petr Fiala, Senate President Miloš Vystrčil, and Speaker of the Chamber of Deputies Markéta Pekarová Adamová.	
23	United States	Washington, D.C.	April 10–13	Working visit. President Marcos attended the first U.S.–Japan–Philippines trilateral summit with President Joe Biden and Prime Minister Fumio Kishida at the White House. Marcos had a bilateral meeting with Biden prior to the summit. First Lady Liza Araneta Marcos did not join this trip.	
24	Brunei	Bandar Seri Begawan	May 28–29	Main article: State visit by Bongbong Marcos to Brunei State visit. President Marcos and First Lady Liza Araneta Marcos met with Sultan Hassanal Bolkiah and Queen Saleha at the Istana Nurul Iman, where they were hosted to a state dinner on May 28. They also met with the Filipino community in Brunei. On May 29, the President addressed Bruneian business leaders at a forum.	
24	Singapore	Central Area	May 29–31	Working visit. President Marcos addressed the Shangri-La Dialogue on May 31 as a keynote speaker, becoming the first Philippine president to do so. On the sidelines, he met with President Tharman Shanmugaratnam and Prime Minister Lawrence Wong at the Istana, as well as Senior Minister Lee Hsien Loong. Marcos also met with Lithuanian prime minister Ingrida Šimonytė.	
25	Laos	Vientiane	October 8–11	Working visit. President Marcos attended the 44th and 45th ASEAN Summit, the Nineteenth East Asia Summit, and other related meetings. He met separately with Canadian prime minister Justin Trudeau, Japanese prime minister Shigeru Ishiba, New Zealand Prime Minister Christopher Luxon, and Vietnamese prime minister Phạm Minh Chính.	
26	Indonesia	Jakarta	October 20–21	President Marcos and First Lady Liza Araneta Marcos attended the inauguration of President Prabowo Subianto and Vice President Gibran Rakabuming Raka.	
27	United Arab Emirates	Abu Dhabi, Dubai	November 26–27	Working visit. President Marcos met with President Sheikh Mohamed bin Zayed Al Nahyan and Vice President Sheikh Mohammed bin Rashid Al Maktoum. Unlike in most of their other visits, the President and his delegation did not meet with the Filipino community there, citing the need to prioritize the government's response to the November 2024 typhoons.	

== 2025 ==
	Country	Areas visited	Dates	Details	Image
28	Italy	Rome	April 25–27	Working visit. Arriving via Rome, President Marcos and First Lady Liza Araneta Marcos attended the funeral of Pope Francis at St. Peter's Square on April 26.	
28	Vatican City	Vatican City	April 26	Working visit. Arriving via Rome, President Marcos and First Lady Liza Araneta Marcos attended the funeral of Pope Francis at St. Peter's Square on April 26.	
29	Malaysia	Kuala Lumpur	May 25–27	President Marcos attended the 46th ASEAN Summit at the Kuala Lumpur Convention Centre on May 26–27. On the sidelines of the summit, the President met separately with Kuwaiti Crown Prince Sabah Al-Khalid Al-Sabah, Cambodian prime minister Hun Manet, Lao prime minister Sonexay Siphandone, Thai prime minister Paetongtarn Shinawatra, and Vietnamese prime minister Phạm Minh Chính.	
30	Japan	Osaka	June 19–21	Working visit. President Marcos and First Lady Liza Araneta Marcos visited the Philippine pavilion at Expo 2025. On the sidelines, he met with officials from H.I.S., the Japan Tourism Agency, Kanadevia, Tsuneishi Shipbuilding, and other agencies and organizations. Marcos also met with the Filipino community in a gathering at Swissôtel Nankai Osaka.	
31	United States	Washington, D.C., Arlington County	July 20–22	Official visit. President Marcos met with President Donald Trump at the White House. Marcos also met separately with Defense Secretary Pete Hegseth at the Pentagon, Secretary of State Marco Rubio at the Harry S Truman Building, Central Intelligence Agency director John Ratcliffe, and executives of the private equity firms Cerberus, I Squared, and KKR. The President did not meet with the local Filipino community due to time constraints. He stayed at the Blair House during his visit, the first Philippine leader to do so since Corazon Aquino in 1989. First Lady Liza Araneta Marcos did not join this trip.	
32	India	New Delhi, Bengaluru	August 4–8	State visit, the first by a Philippine president to India since Gloria Macapagal Arroyo in 2007. President Marcos met with External Affairs Minister S. Jaishankar at the Taj Mahal Hotel on August 4 for the state visit's briefing. The President and his delegation then met with the local Filipino community at the hotel. On August 5, President Marcos and First Lady Liza Araneta Marcos met with President Droupadi Murmu and Prime Minister Narendra Modi at Rashtrapati Bhavan for a welcome ceremony, before the First Couple laid a wreath at Raj Ghat. President Marcos and Prime Minister Modi later held a bilateral meeting at Hyderabad House, followed by a joint press conference. On August 7–8, the President and his delegation traveled to Bengaluru to meet with Karnataka Governor Thawar Chand Gehlot, who hosted them to a banquet, and several business leaders from the IT and BPO sectors, including those from Hinduja Group and Tata Group.	
33	Cambodia	Phnom Penh, Kandal Stueng District	September 7–9	State visit. After arriving on September 7, the President and his delegation met with the local Filipino community at Sofitel hotel. On September 8, President Marcos and First Lady Liza Araneta Marcos laid wreaths at the Independence Monument and the Norodom Sihanouk Memorial before meeting with Prime Minister Hun Manet at the Peace Palace. They also met with Senate President and former prime minister Hun Sen there, who later hosted them to a state dinner. On September 9, President Marcos and his delegation departed Cambodia from the newly-opened Techo International Airport in Kandal Stueng, becoming the first foreign dignitary to use Cambodia's largest airport.	
34	Malaysia	Kuala Lumpur	October 25–28	President Marcos attended the 47th ASEAN Summit and related summits at the Kuala Lumpur Convention Centre on October 26–28. He also met separately with Australian prime minister Anthony Albanese, Cambodian prime minister Hun Manet, Canadian prime minister Mark Carney, Japanese prime minister Sanae Takaichi, Thai prime minister Anutin Charnvirakul, and United Nations Secretary-General António Guterres on the sidelines of the summit. During the summit's closing ceremony, Malaysian prime minister Anwar Ibrahim formally turned over the ASEAN chairship to President Marcos for 2026.	
35	South Korea	Busan, Gyeongju	October 30 – November 2	President Marcos attended the APEC Economic Leaders' Meeting at the Gyeongju Hwabaek International Convention Center on October 31 – November 1. He also addressed the APEC CEO Summit, met with the Filipino community in Busan, and laid a wreath at the United Nations Memorial Cemetery.	

== 2026 ==
	Country	Areas visited	Dates	Details	Image
36	United Arab Emirates	Abu Dhabi	January 12–13	Working visit. President Marcos attended the Abu Dhabi Sustainability Week and witnessed the signing of a defense pact and a free trade agreement between the Philippines and the UAE. He also met with President Mohamed bin Zayed Al Nahyan.	
37	United States	New York City	March 8–10	Working visit. President Marcos addressed the 70th session of the United Nations Commission on the Status of Women and a special plenary session of the UN General Assembly. He hosted a luncheon reception for the permanent representatives to the United Nations to seek support for the Philippines' bid for a non-permanent seat in the UN Security Council from 2027 to 2028. He also met with UN Secretary-General António Guterres and several business executives.	
38	Japan	Tokyo	May 26–29	Main article: State visit by Bongbong Marcos to Japan State visit. President Marcos and First Lady Liza Araneta Marcos were received by Emperor Naruhito and Empress Masako at the Imperial Palace for a state call and a state banquet. During the state call, the President received the Grand Cordon of the Supreme Order of the Chrysanthemum, while the First Lady received the Grand Cordon of the Order of the Precious Crown. The President also met with Prime Minister Sanae Takaichi, Japanese business groups, and the local Filipino community there. Marcos also addressed the National Diet.	
39	Russia	Kazan	June 17–18	Working visit. President Marcos attended the ASEAN–Russia Commemorative Summit with President Vladimir Putin and other ASEAN leaders. Marcos also met with Putin separately for a bilateral meeting. First Lady Liza Araneta Marcos did not join this trip.	
40	Canada	Vancouver	July 1–4	Official visit. President Marcos and First Lady Liza Araneta Marcos met with Prime Minister Mark Carney at the Vancouver Convention Centre. During the meeting, the two leaders agreed to upgrade bilateral relations to a strategic partnership. Marcos also met with various business leaders and the Filipino community in Vancouver.	
41	Singapore	Central Area	July 14–16	Working visit. President Marcos met with Prime Minister Lawrence Wong. He also participated in a round table discussion with business leaders hosted by the Milken Institute.	
42	India	New Delhi	September 11–13	Working visit. President Marcos attended the 18th BRICS summit as an invited guest being the chairperson of ASEAN in 2026. He also met with Prime Minister Narendra Modi and Indian business leaders.	
43	Singapore	Central Area	October 7–11	Working visit. President Marcos participated in a one-on-one onstage discussion with Forbes editor-in-chief Steve Forbes during the 24th Forbes Global CEO Conference at the Shangri-La Hotel. He also met with other business executives and visited the Singapore Nuclear Research and Safety Institute. On October 11, President Marcos attended the 2026 Singapore Grand Prix at the invitation of Prime Minister Lawrence Wong, whom he met on the sidelines of the event. First Lady Liza Araneta Marcos did not join this trip.	
44	China	Shenzhen	November 18–19	President Marcos attended the APEC Economic Leaders' Meeting. He also met with Chilean president José Antonio Kast, Papuan prime minister James Marape, and Peruvian president Keiko Fujimori.	

== Future trips ==
The following international trips are scheduled to be made by Bongbong Marcos:

== Public perception and response ==
President Bongbong Marcos' international trips, particularly his unannounced visit to the 2022 Singapore Grand Prix, have been met with both criticism and defense. His attendance at the event, which came shortly after Super Typhoon Noru and during a period of record-high inflation, sparked public concern after photos of Marcos, his family, and staff at the event surfaced on social media. Labor group Kilusang Mayo Uno criticized the trip as insensitive, while Bayan Secretary General Renato Reyes questioned why Malacañang Palace did not announce the visit beforehand as it was classified as an official visit. In response, Marcos stated that the trip aimed to foster business relations, humorously noting that while golf is often cited as a way to "drum up business", he believed Formula One could serve the same purpose. The Palace later clarified that Marcos and his family traveled to Singapore on a military jet.

The controversy resurfaced when Marcos also attended the 2023 Singapore Grand Prix (albeit announced beforehand), prompting new criticism. The National Network of Agrarian Reform Advocates-Youth (NNARA-Youth), a peasant advocacy group, condemned his presence at the event, with spokesperson Marina Cavan criticizing Marcos for "enjoying the high life" while Filipinos struggled with rising prices and oil hikes. NNARA-Youth also pointed to Republic Act 6713, which mandates public officials to live modestly, and questioned the President's priorities, especially as he concurrently served as Secretary of Agriculture then. Similarly, Bayan's Renato Reyes lamented Sky Sports F1's broadcast of Marcos at a Ferrari garage during the 2023 race, contrasting it with the economic hardships faced by Filipino motorists enduring consecutive oil price hikes. Reyes questioned whether the Paddock Club tickets, which can cost up to US$11,000 (around ₱425,000) per person, were purchased for the presidential entourage, while also noting the ₱1.4 billion travel budget requested by Marcos for 2024.

Critics, particularly opposition lawmakers, have framed these trips as part of a broader effort to rehabilitate the Marcos family's image on the global stage. ACT party-list representative France Castro suggested that by associating with influential figures worldwide, Marcos was attempting to distance himself from the legacy of corruption and human rights violations tied to his father's regime.

Public opinion on Marcos' foreign travels has shifted over time. A Social Weather Stations survey from mid-2024 revealed that 51% of respondents saw little to no benefit from these trips, a notable increase from 44% in a similar 2022 survey. Conversely, the percentage of respondents who believed the trips had much or very much benefit declined. Despite this, Malacañang maintains that these trips are crucial for securing investments and advancing the administration's economic agenda. Marcos himself has consistently emphasized the importance of positioning the Philippines as a key investment destination in Asia, citing ₱3.9 trillion in investment pledges secured during his travels by mid-2023. These pledges, according to the government, have the potential to create 175,000 jobs.

Chief Presidential Legal Counsel Juan Ponce Enrile has defended the necessity of these international engagements, explaining that many trips are made at the invitation of host countries. He argued that if Marcos declined these invitations, he could be accused of neglecting the country's interests on the global stage. Enrile highlighted that these trips address vital issues such as national security and economic cooperation.

Data from the Department of Trade and Industry supports the administration's position, reporting ₱4.019 trillion (US$72.178 billion) in investment commitments from 2023. These investments, spanning sectors like manufacturing, renewable energy, and telecommunications, could generate over 200,000 jobs. Several projects are already operational, while others are in various stages of progress.

Budget Secretary Amenah Pangandaman acknowledged that while the travel budget for 2025 was slightly reduced, she expected the President to still pursue international trips to follow up on those commitments. The Commission on Audit, however, noted a significant increase in the Office of the President's travel expenses, which surged by 996% in 2022.

Former trade secretary Alfredo E. Pascual reported that by the end of 2023, Marcos' foreign trips had already led to actualized investments worth ₱294 billion (US$5.28 billion), resulting in job creation across various sectors. Economist Michael Ricafort has observed an increase in foreign direct investments since Marcos took office, attributing some of this growth to the investment commitments secured during these trips.

== Multilateral meetings ==
Multilateral meetings of the following intergovernmental organizations the Philippines is a member of (or invited to) that took place, or are scheduled to take place, during Marcos' term in office.

Group	Year						
Group	2022	2023	2024	2025	2026	2027	2028
APEC	November 16–19, (Thailand) Bangkok	November 15–17, (United States) San Francisco	November 15–16, (Peru) Lima^{[d]}	October 31 – November 1, (South Korea) Gyeongju	18–19 November, (China) Shenzhen	TBD, Vietnam	TBD, Mexico
ASEAN (EAS)	November 10–13, (Cambodia) Phnom Penh	May 9–11, (Indonesia) Labuan Bajo	October 8–11, (Laos) Vientiane	May 26–27, (Malaysia) Kuala Lumpur	May 6–8, (Philippines) Cebu	TBA	TBA
ASEAN (EAS)	November 10–13, (Cambodia) Phnom Penh	September 5–7, (Indonesia) Jakarta	October 8–11, (Laos) Vientiane	October 26–28, (Malaysia) Kuala Lumpur	November 16–18, (Philippines) Manila	TBA	TBA
UNCCC	November 6–18,^{[a]} (Egypt) Sharm el-Sheikh	November 30 – December 12,^{[a]} (United Arab Emirates) Dubai	November 11–22,^{[a]} (Azerbaijan) Baku	TBA	TBA	TBA	TBA
UNGA	September 20, (United States) New York City	September 21,^{[b]} (United States) New York City	September 20,^{[b]} (United States) New York City	September 21,^{[e]} (United States) New York City	September 26,^{[e]} (United States) New York City	September, (United States) New York City	—N/a
Others	ASEAN–EU Commemorative Summit; December 14, (Belgium) Brussels	World Economic Forum; January 16–20, (Switzerland) Davos	ASEAN–Australia Special Summit; March 3–6, Melbourne		ASEAN–Russia Commemorative Summit; June 17–18, Kazan		
Others	ASEAN–EU Commemorative Summit; December 14, (Belgium) Brussels	Milken Institute Asia Summit; September 13, Singapore	United States–Japan–Philippines Summit; April 10–13, Washington D.C.		BRICS Summit; September 12–13, (India) New Delhi		
Others	ASEAN–EU Commemorative Summit; December 14, (Belgium) Brussels	ASEAN–GCC Summit; October 20, (Saudi Arabia) Riyadh	Shangri-La Dialogue; May 31, Singapore				
Others	ASEAN–EU Commemorative Summit; December 14, (Belgium) Brussels	ASEAN–Japan Friendship and Cooperation Commemorative Summit; December 16–18, Tokyo	Ukraine peace summit June 15–16,^{[c]} (Switzerland) Nidwalden				
██ = Hosted by the Philippines ██ = Did not attend ██ = Future event^aEnvironment Secretary Toni Yulo-Loyzaga attended in the president's place.^b Foreign Affairs Secretary Enrique Manalo attended in the president's place.^c Presidential Adviser on Peace Carlito Galvez Jr. attended in the president's place.^d Then-acting Trade and Industry Secretary Cristina Aldeguer-Roque attended in the president's place.^e Foreign Affairs Secretary Tess Lazaro attended in the president's place.

== See also ==
- Foreign policy of the Philippines
- Foreign relations of the Philippines
- List of international presidential trips made by Rodrigo Duterte, his predecessor
