= Philippines–Thailand Friendship Circle =

- Interactive map of Philippines–Thailand Friendship Circle

Location
- Santa Ana, Manila, Philippines
- Coordinates: 14°34′45.95″N 121°0′43.85″E
- Roads at junction: Jose Syquia Street; M. Roxas Street; Revellin Street; Zamora Street

Construction
- Type: Traffic circle
- Maintained by: Department of Public Works and Highways

The Philippines–Thailand Friendship Circle is a traffic circle in Santa Ana, Manila, Philippines. It is located at the intersection of Jose Syquia, M. Roxas, Revellin, and Zamora Streets, near the Santa Ana Public Market.

Originally unnamed (residents of Santa Ana simply called it the "Rotonda" and still do today), the circle was given its present name by virtue of Ordinance No. 7964, authored by Councilor Luciano "Lou" Veloso and passed in 1999, as a reciprocal gesture after a street in Bangkok was named "Soi Philippines" the year before. While initially inaugurated during the visit of Prime Minister Chuan Leekpai to the Philippines that year, renovation works on the circle would not be complete until 2002.

The circle was re-inaugurated on March 30, 2009 by Mayor Alfredo Lim to commemorate sixty years of Philippines–Thailand relations.

== Architecture ==
The Philippines–Thailand Friendship Circle contains a 10-foot (3.0 m) artificial waterfall, a nipa hut, an orchidarium, statues, a performance area and a bonsai garden. At the center is a monument named the Angel of Unity, commemorating the relationship between the two countries.
