= Philippines–Thailand relations =

- Philippines: Thailand

Diplomatic mission
- Embassy of the Philippines, Bangkok: Royal Thai Embassy, Manila

Envoy
- Ambassdor Millicent Cruz-Paredes: Ambassdor Makavadee Sumitmor

Filipino–Thai relations (Thai: ความสัมพันธ์ฟิลิปปินส์-ไทย; Tagalog: Ugnayang Pilipino at Taylandiya) refers to the bilateral relations between the Philippines and Thailand. The Philippines established formal diplomatic relations with Thailand on June 14, 1949. The relations between the two are described as warm and friendly. Thailand is one of the Philippines' major trade partners and one of the Philippines' sources of rice through Thai exports. Bilateral relations continues to be strengthened through talks and agreements on economic, security and cultural matters including concerns on rice trade, fight on drugs and human trafficking. Thailand has an embassy in Manila and an honorary consulate in Cebu, while the Philippines maintains an embassy in Bangkok. Both countries are members of ASEAN and the Non-Aligned Movement.

== History ==
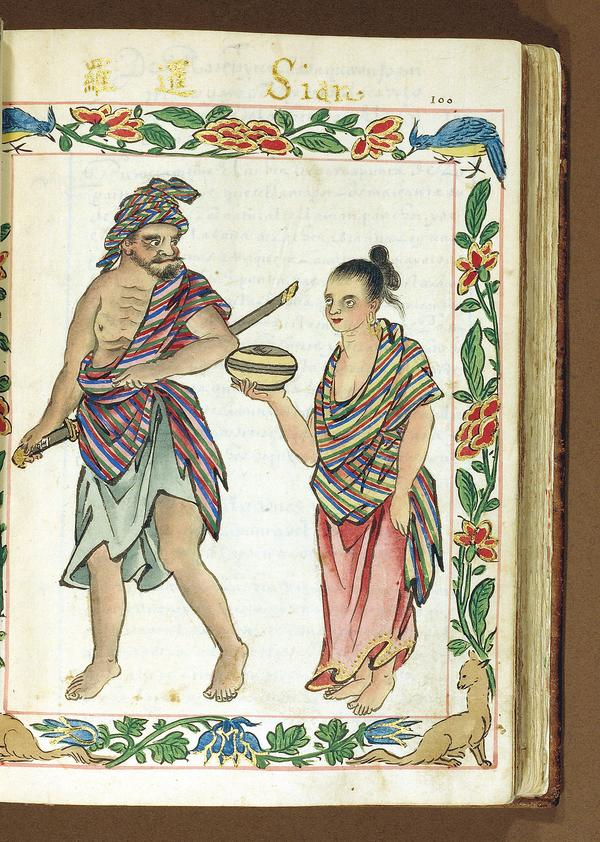
Thai (Siamese) in the Philippines, c. 1590 via Boxer Codex

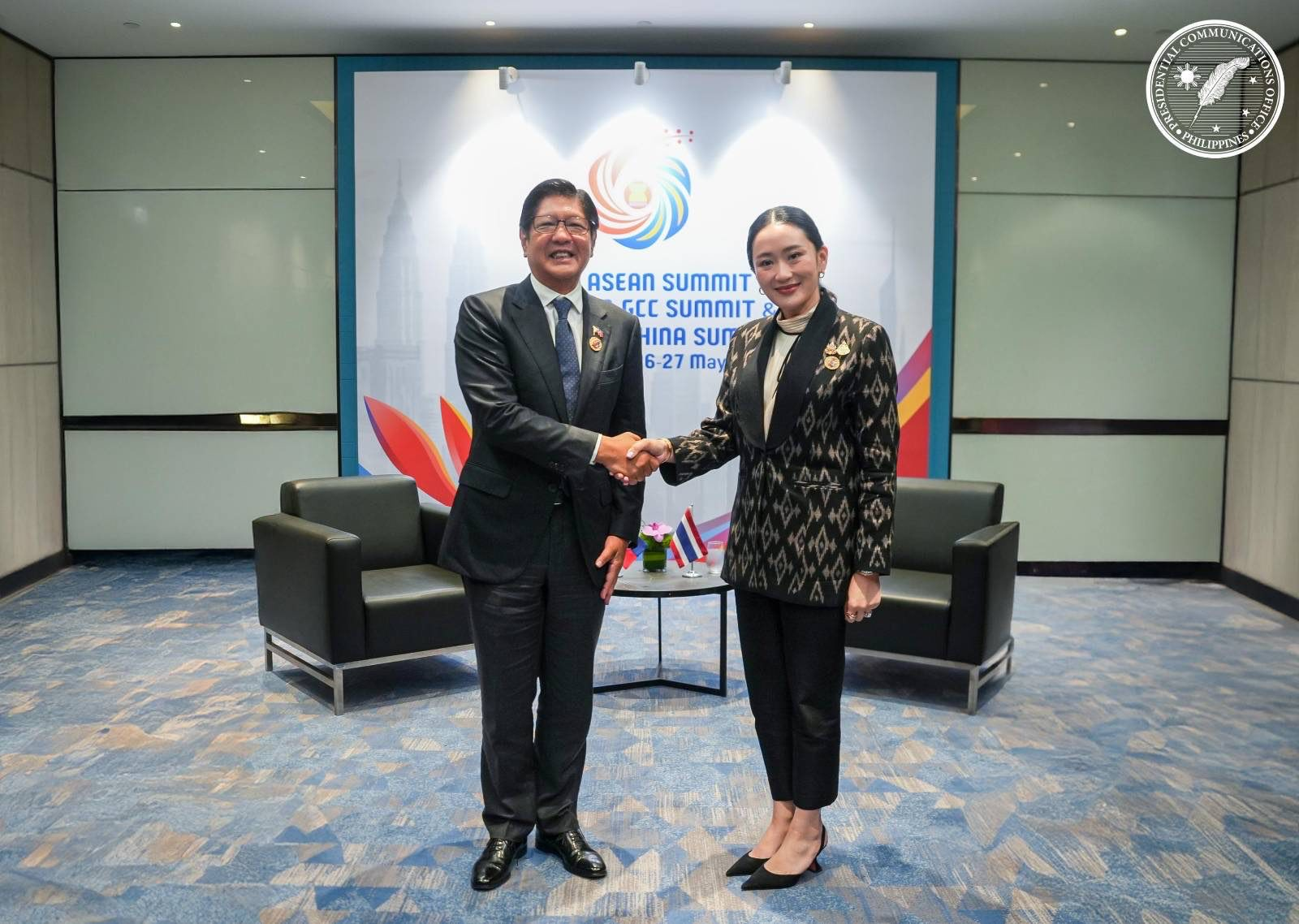
Philippine President Bongbong Marcos and Thai Prime Minister Paetongtarn Shinawatra meet in Kuala Lumpur, Malaysia, in May 2025

The Philippines and Thailand began its relation way-back. Jade artifacts manufactured in the Philippines using raw Jade from Taiwan were exported to the Gulf of Thailand as early as 2000 BC. According to sources from Southern Liang, people from the kingdom of Langkasuka in present-day Thailand have been wearing cotton clothes made in Luzon as early as 516-520 AD. In the 13th century in the context of Southeast Asian maritime trade, archaeological records point not only to commercial and cultural ties but also a recognition of their political stature. Siam with its kingdoms and the Philippines with its harbor states and their datus, rajahs, and sultans. There were also ceramic wares from Sukhothai and Sawankhalok found in Luzon and Visayas region as evidence of early relations. Southeast Asian wares found in the Philippines from the 13th century to 16th century period were mostly from Siam. Portuguese explorers recorded Lucoes (People from Luzon), participating in the Burmese-Siamese wars, working as soldiers for both Siam (Thailand) and Burma (Myanmar), there were even Filipino/Lucoes soldiers during the siege of Ayuthaya. Diogo do Couto wrote in, Décadas da Ásia (Lisbon, 1778) Vol. 5, pp. 95–100 (Década VIII, Livro II, cap. V) Siam (1547); this of them: "Under their chief Balagtas, 300 Luções fought for the King of Siam against Burmese invaders—so effective that the Siamese granted them land." The fact that the Siamese ennobled the Luções by granting them royal land and that Luções military and trade activity reached as far as Sri Lanka in South Asia where Lungshanoid pottery made in Luzon were discovered in burials is proof that the Luções formed a long range geographic network applying soft power among the many nations the Philippines traded and worked with.

During Ferdinand Magellan's circumnavigation of the globe, upon anchoring on the port-kingdom of the Cebu Rajahnate, Antonio Pigafetta, the expedition scribe, noted an embassy carried by a ship from Siam (Thailand), had previously paid tribute to the king, Rajah Humabon. In 1586, two decades after Spain set foot in the Philippines, Siam was mentioned as a possible goal of commercial interests and physical expansion and the first contact was made between Spain and Thailand. Trade relations between the Philippine archipelago and Siam were disrupted as Spain prioritized developing trade between Philippines to the Americas and the Iberian Peninsula. During the American colonial administration in the Philippines, relations remain limited to commercial exchanges, consular contacts and the admission of Thai students to study in the then American colony. During this period, the biggest import of the Philippines to Thailand was rice and Thailand's biggest import from the Philippines was abaca. As early as 1926, Philippine universities and colleges began to accept students from Thailand. And after 1949, specifically during the economic crisis, the Philippines imported Thai agricultural commodities especially rice. In the 1970s, Thailand's Sangha Supreme Council (Mahāthera Samāgama), the most powerful Buddhist sangha in Southeast Asia which governs the Buddhist faith in three nations (Thailand, Cambodia, and Laos), made contacts with the Philippines to re-introduce Theravada Buddhism in the Philippines. However, the contacts were not followed through.

On June 14, 1949, official diplomatic relations were established between the Philippines and Thailand. On December 14, 1949, Envoy Extraordinary and Minister Plenipotentiary Dr. Luang Bhadravadi presented his credentials to President Quirino. It marked the occasion of the first diplomatic mission of Thailand to the Philippines. On January 1, 1956, both countries' diplomatic posts were officially upgraded to embassies.

During the later years of Philippine President Ferdinand Marcos' term and President Corazon Aquino's term, from 1978 to 1992, relations between the Philippines and Thailand remained friendly, but were in some aspects neglected due to economic crisis and the political situation in the Philippines during the Martial law era. The relations were strengthened again after the said period. Bilateral relations were further reinforced during a state visit of the Thai Prime Minister Prayut Chan-o-cha in 2015 to the Philippines.

== Agreements ==
A Treaty of Friendship was signed by both countries on June 14, 1949. Bilateral and trade relations between the two countries continue to be characterized by harmony, dynamism, and warmth and strengthened when they became founding members of the Southeast Asia Treaty Organization in 1954 and ASEAN in 1967. Several bilateral agreements have since been signed on defense, investment, environment, tourism, air services, and scientific, technical, agriculture, and telecommunications exchanges. Thailand and the Philippines signed three agreements on taxation, energy and business cooperation during a high-level Thai delegation's visit to the Philippines in 2013. One of these agreement between the education ministries of the two countries will be signed on exchange of English language teachers to improve language proficiency of the Thai people. In 2015, agreements on the Terms of Reference for the Working Group of the Philippine Army and Royal Thai Army. Both countries also committed each other to the Memorandum of Understanding (MOU) on Cooperation in Combating Illicit Trafficking in Narcotic Drugs and the Memorandum of Agreement (MOA) on the Exchanges of Professional Teachers.

== Economic relations ==
In 2018, the Philippines exported US$2.9 billion worth of goods to Thailand, and importing US$7.79 billion in the same year. 59,973 Thai tourists visited the Philippines, while 432,053 Philippine tourists visited Thailand in 2018.

The Philippines and Thailand had a dispute regarding taxation of the former's cigarette exporter doing business in the latter. The issue has been raised to the World Trade Organization. In 2008, the Philippines has expressed that Thailand violated WTO law on Customs violation by imposing an allegedly discriminatory tax on cigarette exports by Philip Morris Philippines. Thailand alleged that the export's Customs value were under-declared with the allegation declared illegal under the WTO's Customs Valuation Agreement (CVA). Three panel rulings of the WTO has ruled in favor of the Philippines.

== State visits ==
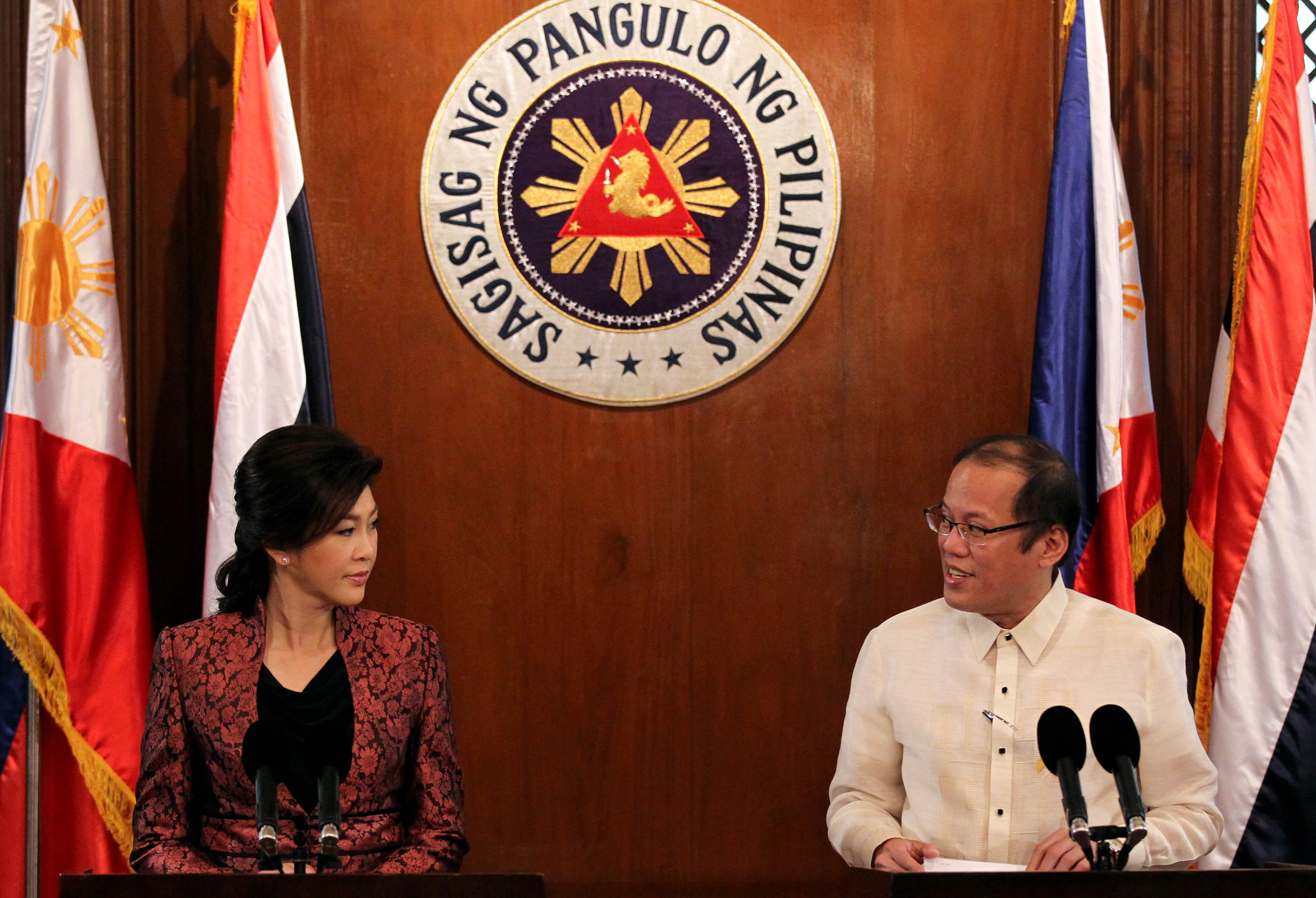
Thai Prime Minister Yingluck Shinawatra and Philippine President Benigno Aquino III during the former's official visit to Manila in January 2012

In 1963, His Majesty King Bhumibol Adulyadej and Queen Sirikit, made a 5-day state visit to the Philippines. Philippine President Fidel V. Ramos visited Thailand in December 1995 followed by President Joseph Estrada in December 1998. Many other high-level visits, people-to-people contact, and cooperation under various frameworks mark the mutually beneficial relations between the two countries.

In 2011, President Benigno Aquino III undertook his first official visit to Thailand. He met with Thai Prime Minister Abhisit Vejjajiva. The visit aimed to further strengthen the Philippines deep and strong bilateral relations with Thailand, as well as cooperation within the Association of Southeast Asian Nations in order to help build a secure and prosperous ASEAN Community in 2015. The Chief Executive will be accorded with ceremonial honors befitting a head of state like an official welcome ceremony at the Government House in Dusit, Bangkok.

In January 2012, Thai Prime Minister Yingluck Shinawatra visited the Philippines to highlight the 63rd anniversary of establishment of diplomatic relations between the Philippines and Thailand.

In 2017, Philippine President Rodrigo Duterte made a state visit to Thailand from 20 to 22 March. President Duterte and Prime Minister Prayut Chan-o-cha met and discussed various topics, such as economic and defense cooperation, security and agriculture.

== Resident diplomatic missions ==
- the Philippines has an embassy in Bangkok.
- Thailand has an embassy in Manila.

== See also ==
- Foreign relations of Philippines
- Foreign relations of Thailand
- Filipinos in Thailand
- Philippines–Thailand Friendship Circle
