= State visit by Bongbong Marcos to Japan =

- Part of Japan–Philippines relations
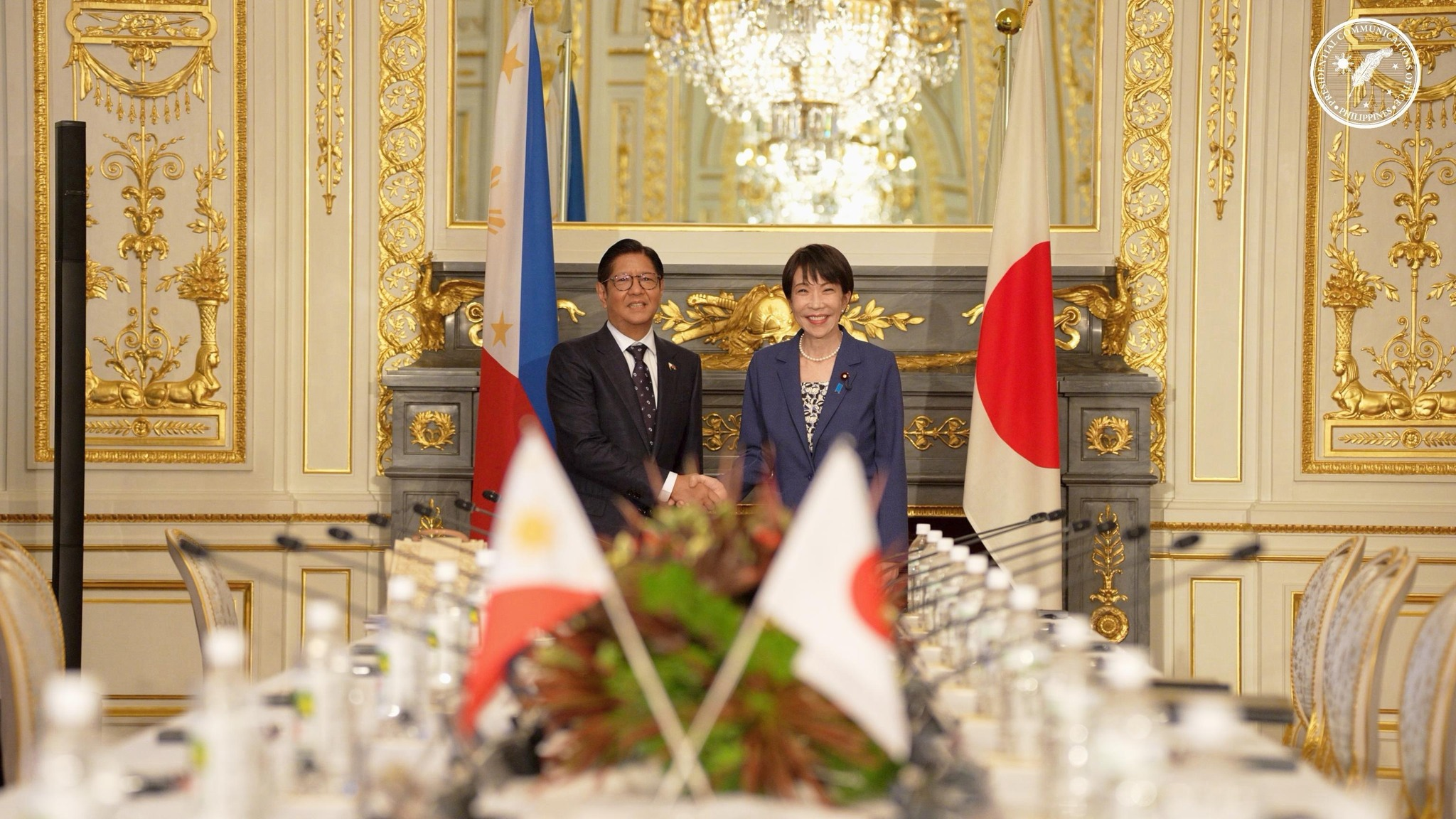
- Philippine President Bongbong Marcos and Japanese Prime Minister Sanae Takaichi in Tokyo, May 28, 2026
- Date: May 26 to 29, 2026
- Location: Tokyo
- Type: State visit
- Participants: His Majesty Emperor Naruhito; Her Majesty Empress Masako; Japanese Prime Minister Sanae Takaichi; Philippine President Bongbong Marcos; First lady Liza Araneta Marcos

From May 26 to 29, 2026, the president of the Philippines, Bongbong Marcos, together with his wife, First Lady Liza Araneta Marcos, made a state visit to Japan. This visit was Marcos' first official state visit to Japan and the first Philippine president in more than a decade. However, looking at his presidency as a whole, it was actually his fourth visit to the country. In February 2023, he made an official working visit to the country, followed by his attendance at the ASEAN–Japan Commemorative Summit held in Tokyo in December of the same year; another official working visit to Tokyo and Osaka in 2025; and lastly, in May 2026, his official state visit. During their state visit, they were received by Their Majesties Emperor Naruhito and Empress Masako at the Imperial Palace. They were also received by Prime Minister Sanae Takaichi at the Akasaka Palace state guest house for a high-level bilateral summit.

== Background ==
Beginning with Philippine President Bongbong Marcos and Japanese Prime Minister Sanae Takaichi's first face-to-face bilateral encounter on the sidelines of the ASEAN Summit in Kuala Lumpur in October 2025, both leaders laid their series of initial diplomatic engagements. The meeting was followed by a telephone meeting in March 2026 and a video conference in April 2026, where both leaders publicly addressed pressing regional matters, including the volatile security landscape of the Indo-Pacific and the global energy crisis. Following these critical discussions, the Japanese government invited President Marcos and first lady Liza Araneta Marcos to undertake a state visit to Japan from May 26 to 29, 2026, marking a historic milestone that coincided with the 70th anniversary of the normalization of diplomatic ties between the two nations, which were formally established on July 23, 1956.

At a pre-departure briefing at Malacañang, Department of Foreign Affairs (DFA) spokesperson, Analyn Rotonel said that "The two countries are expected to announce new agreements on defense, trade and investment and human resources."

Prior to the visit, Philippine and Japanese officials pointed out that discussions would focus on strengthening cooperation in the fields of security, maritime affairs, defense, energy resilience, trade, and investment. The two countries were also expected to discuss the full implementation of the Reciprocal Access Agreement signed in 2024, the Partnership on Wide Energy and Resources Resilience Asia (POWERR Asia), and the reciprocal provision of supplies and services between the Armed Forces of the Philippines and the Japan Self-Defense Forces. A report by Kyodo News on May 21, 2026, likewise stated that the Philippines and Japan were planning to elevate their relations to a Comprehensive Strategic Partnership, the highest level of diplomatic relations between the two countries and to seek closer ties amid regional concerns over an increasingly assertive China.

== Visit ==
=== May 26 ===
The presidential plane carrying Bongbong Marcos and wife Liza Araneta Marcos took off from Villamor Air Base in Pasay City at 1:36 p.m. (PH time).

In his departure statement, Marcos said the state visit comes at a critical time as the Philippines and Japan continue to deepen their strategic partnership amid "increasingly challenging and evolving" regional and global challenges. Marcos said the trip marks his first state visit to Japan since his official and working visits to Tokyo and Osaka in 2023 and 2025.

In afternoon, Marcos and the first lady arrived in Japan. The aircraft carrying the Philippine delegation landed at Haneda Airport at 6:31 p.m. (local time). Shortly after arriving in Japan, President Marcos met with thousands of members of the Filipino community residing and working in the country.

=== May 27 ===
On May 27, 2026, President Bongbong Marcos and First Lady Liza Araneta–Marcos were welcomed by Emperor Naruhito and Empress Masako at the Imperial Palace in Tokyo. A ceremonial welcome was held at the palace's Eastern Court, where the national anthems of the Philippines and Japan were played and Marcos received a guard of honor. The ceremony was attended by Crown Prince Fumihito, Crown Princess Kiko, and Japanese Prime Minister Sanae Takaichi.

Following the ceremonial welcome, the president and his wife held talks with the emperor and the empress for about 20 minutes in the Take no Ma audience room at the palace. After the meeting, the emperor recalled that he stopped at a Philippine airport during a trip to Australia when he was in his third year of junior high school, saying it was the first foreign land he had stepped on. Marcos then invited the emperor and the empress to visit the Philippines, saying that a stopover alone was not enough.

Marcos was also conferred the Grand Cordon of the Supreme Order of the Chrysanthemum, Japan's highest state decoration, while the First Lady received the Grand Cordon of the Order of the Precious Crown. In return, the Philippine government conferred the Order of Lakandula, Rank of Supremo, upon Emperor Naruhito and the Order of Gabriela Silang upon Empress Masako.

In the evening, Emperor Naruhito and Empress Masako hosted a state banquet for the President and the First Lady at the Imperial Palace. The banquet was attended by members of the Japanese Imperial Family, including the daughter of the emperor, Princess Aiko, Crown Prince Fumihito, Crown Princess Kiko, and Prince Hisahito, who made his first appearance at a state banquet welcoming a foreign head of state. Prime Minister Sanae Takaichi and cabinet ministers from both countries were also in attendance.

=== May 28 ===
On May 28, 2026, President Marcos held a bilateral summit meeting with Japanese Prime Minister Sanae Takaichi at the Akasaka Palace state guest house in Tokyo. During the meeting, the two leaders formally announced the elevation of Philippines–Japan relations to a Comprehensive Strategic Partnership, marking the highest level of diplomatic relations between the two countries. They also discussed defense and security cooperation, including the implementation of the Reciprocal Access Agreement, negotiations on a General Security of Military Information Agreement, maritime cooperation, energy security, and economic collaboration.

Marcos also addressed members of the National Diet, becoming one of the few Philippine presidents to speak before the Japanese legislature during an official visit.

On the sidelines of his visit, Marcos met with executives of several Japanese corporations, including officials from Furukawa Electric Co., Ltd., Sumitomo Electric Industries, Ltd., MinebeaMitsumi Inc., and Tsuneishi Group Corporation.

=== May 29 ===
On May 29, 2026, President Marcos and First Lady Liza Araneta–Marcos were given a farewell audience by Emperor Naruhito and Empress Masako at the Imperial Palace. During the meeting, the Emperor and the Empress and the Philippine First Couple reflected on the longstanding friendship between the Philippines and Japan, particularly as the two countries commemorated the 70th anniversary of the normalization of diplomatic relations. The audience lasted approximately 25 minutes and was followed by a personal farewell from the Emperor and Empress.

Before departing Japan, Marcos also held a media briefing in Tokyo, where he described the four-day state visit as "highly productive and constructive." He highlighted the strengthening of bilateral relations, expanded economic cooperation, and the advancement of strategic and security partnerships between the Philippines and Japan. Later that day, Marcos, the First Lady, and the Philippine delegation departed Tokyo and returned to Manila, concluding the state visit.

== Results ==
The state visit resulted in the elevation of Philippines–Japan relations to a Comprehensive Strategic Partnership, the highest level of bilateral diplomatic ties between the two countries.

The agreement expanded cooperation in security and defense, particularly through the implementation of the Reciprocal Access Agreement, which enables the reciprocal deployment, training, and logistical support of armed forces between the Philippines and Japan.

Both sides also reaffirmed cooperation for the Partnership on Wide Energy and Resources Resilience Asia (POWERR Asia), focusing on energy security, critical resources, and supply chain resilience. Japan likewise expressed continued support for Philippine infrastructure development, maritime security capacity-building, and economic investments.

In return, the Philippines committed to strengthening defense interoperability with Japan's Self-Defense Forces, enhancing maritime domain awareness cooperation, and supporting joint initiatives in disaster response and regional security.

The visit also secured approximately ₱56.3 billion in Japanese investment commitments and the creation of around 10,300 jobs in the Philippines, following business meetings with major Japanese firms including Furukawa Electric Co., Sumitomo Electric Industries, MinebeaMitsumi, and the Tsuneishi Group Corporation.

== Analysis and reactions ==
China expressed strong opposition to the decision by Japan and the Philippines to begin formal negotiations on delimiting their maritime boundaries, describing the talks as "illegal and invalid" and asserting what it claims as its own maritime jurisdiction in the affected waters.

In a commentary published by the Communist Party-affiliated newspaper People's Daily, it criticized Japan and the Philippines in relation to their growing security cooperation, stating that both countries have long-standing territorial disputes with Beijing and describing them as a "source of trouble" and a potential risk to regional peace and stability. Following related maritime and boundary discussions between Japan and the Philippines, China conducted coast guard patrol operations east of Taiwan on June 7, 2026, which Chinese sources described as a response to what it characterized as unilateral moves affecting its maritime interests.

== See also ==
- List of international presidential trips made by Bongbong Marcos
