= State visit by Bongbong Marcos to Brunei =

- Part of Brunei–Philippines relations
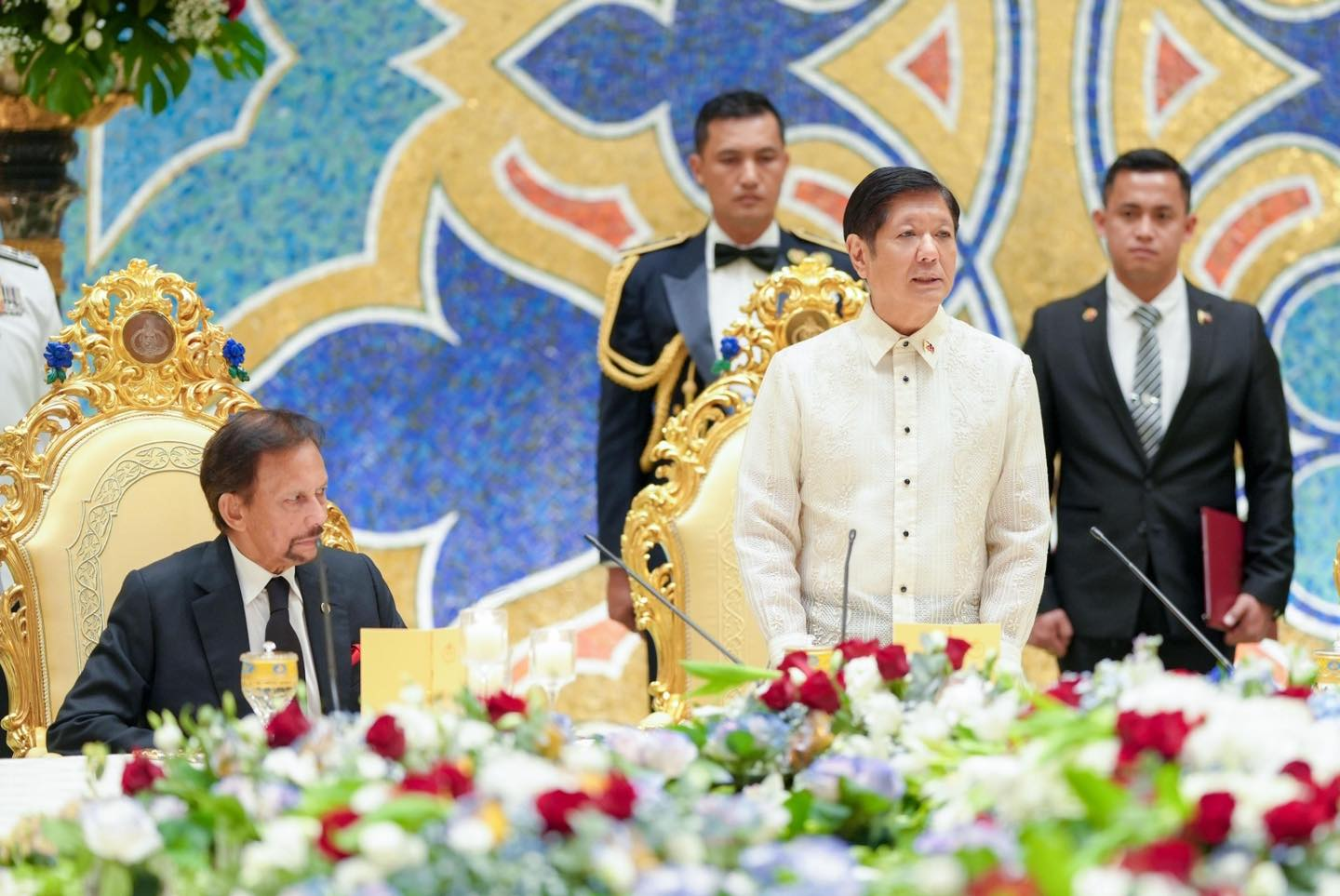
- Sultan Hassanal Bolkiah (left) and Philippine President Bongbong Marcos (right)
- Date: May 28 to 29, 2024
- Location: Bandar Seri Begawan
- Type: State visit
- Participants: His Majesty Sultan Hassanal Bolkiah; Philippine President Bongbong Marcos

From May 28 to 29, 2024, the president of the Philippines, Bongbong Marcos, made a state visit to Brunei with his wife, the first lady of the Philippines, Liza Araneta Marcos. He was received by Sultan Hassanal Bolkiah at Istana Nurul Iman, and later met with local business leaders where they held forums to discuss a range of topics, including agricultural cooperation and investments in the Bangsamoro Autonomous Region.

After the Brunei state visit, Marcos proceeded to Singapore from May 29 to 31 as the first Philippine president to speak at the International Institute for Strategic Studies' (IISS) Shangri-La Dialogue, an annual intergovernmental security forum which is participated in by defense and military officials and experts, as well as business leaders to discuss critical security challenges around the globe.

== Background ==
The state visit was organized to commemorate and reinforce the bilateral relations between the Philippines and Brunei Darussalam, coinciding with the landmark 40th anniversary of the establishment of formal diplomatic relations. President Marcos initiated this trip upon the official invitation of Sultan Hassanal Bolkiah to review the progress of the two nations' bilateral cooperation, seek alignments on regional defense, and cultivate economic partnerships.

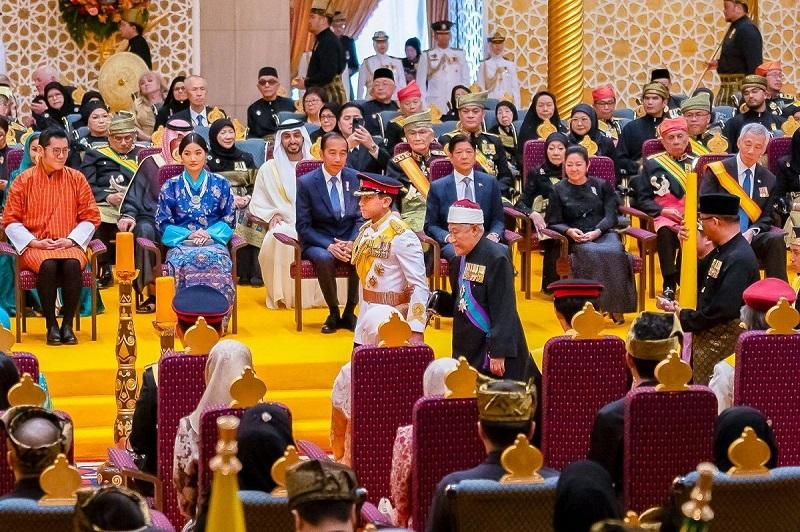
President Marcos and First Lady Liza Araneta Marcos at the wedding reception of Prince Abdul Mateen and Anisha Rosnah, January 2024

While the trip was his state visit to the sultanate, it did not represent his first time visiting the country during his presidency. On January 13 to 14, 2024, Marcos and the First Lady traveled to Bandar Seri Begawan on a working visit to attend the royal wedding of the Sultan's son, Prince Abdul Mateen, at the invitation of Sultan Bolkiah. The trip marked his 27th international visit since assuming office on June 30, 2022.

== Visit ==
=== May 28 ===
The state visit officially commemxed on the morning of May 28, 2024, when President Marcos delivered a departure statement at the Villamor Airbase in Pasay City, pointing out that the mission as a vital step to re-energize bilateral ties and secure regional stability. The presidential aircraft landed at the Bandar Seri Begawan International Airport at 10:01 a.m., where the Philippine delegation was warmly received by Bruneian government officials.

Following their arrival, Marcos and the First Lady proceeded to the Istana Nurul Iman, the official royal residence of the Sultan of Brunei, for an official welcoming ceremony featuring military arrival honors. The President then had a general audience with Sultan Hassanal Bolkiah and Queen Saleha. This was succeeded by a private tête-à-tête and an expanded bilateral meeting where the two leaders discussed regional defense, trade under the Brunei Darussalam-Indonesia-Malaysia-Philippines East ASEAN Growth Area (BIMP-EAGA) framework, and the peaceful resolution of conflicts in the Indo-Pacific. Following their discussions, Marcos and the Sultan witnessed the signing of three Memoranda of Understanding (MOUs) and a Letter of Intent (LOI) focusing on tourism, maritime cooperation, agricultural modernization, and seafarer credentials.

In the afternoon, the President traveled to the BRIDEX International Convention Centre to address the local Filipino community. There are estimated 25,000 Filipinos living and working in Brunei. Marcos encouraged the Filipino community to continue representing the country with distinction and to eventually consider investing back home and "assured them of my administration's tireless endeavors and projects in ensuring their safety and well-being".

The first day of the visit concluded with a formal state banquet hosted by Sultan Bolkiah at the Istana Nurul Iman, during which both leaders delivered speeches honoring their shared history and bilateral achievements.

=== May 29 ===
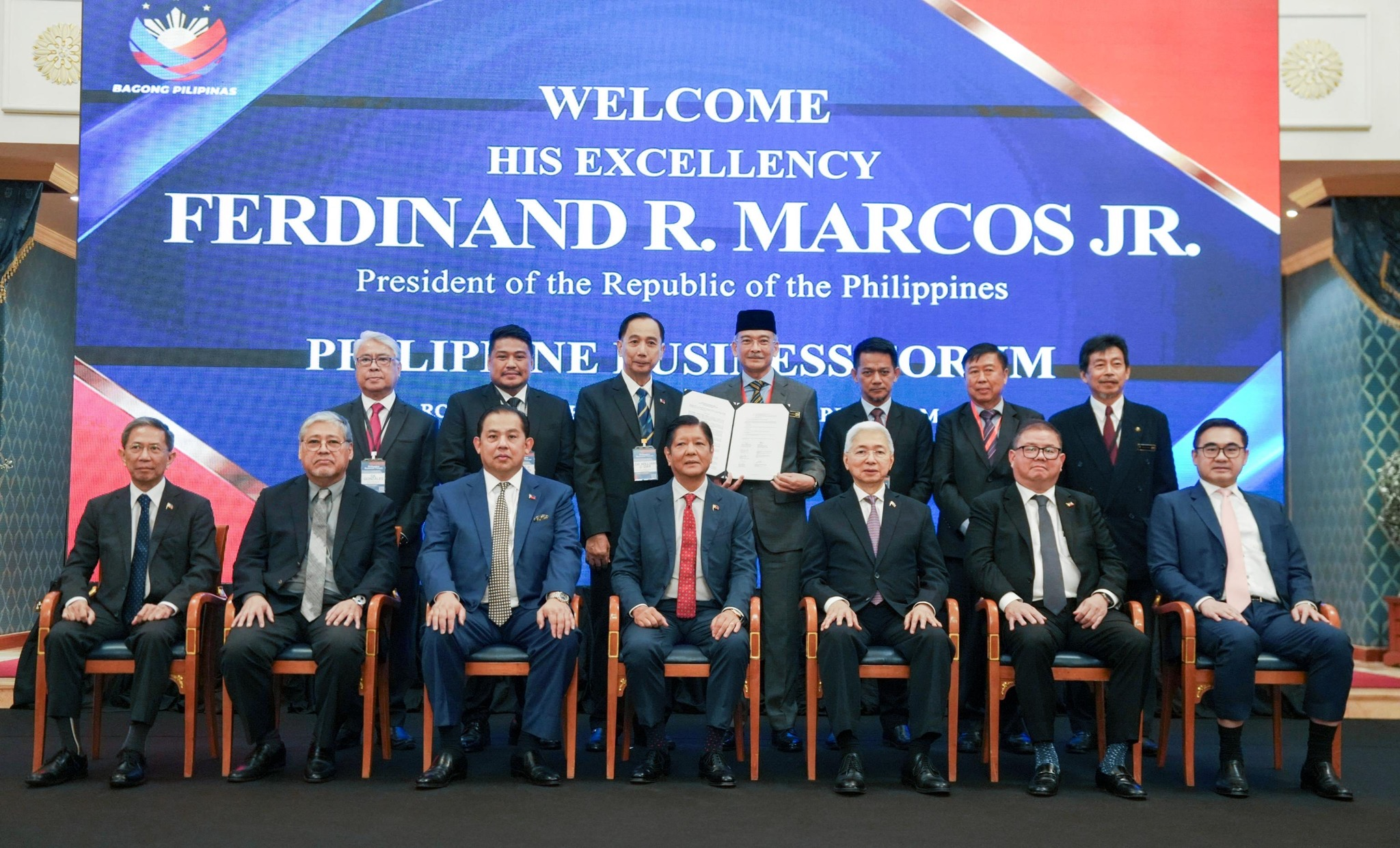
Bongbong Marcos (center) with business delegations after signing two deals to boost the two countries' ties on agriculture, trade

On the second day of the state visit, President Marcos led the Philippine Business Forum in Bandar Seri Begawan, which drew approximately 200 participants from various Bruneian business sectors, chambers of commerce, and investment groups. At the forum, Marcos delivered a keynote speech urging Bruneian commercial entities to take advantage of the Philippines' robust economic growth and favorable investment climate. The President also met with energy sector executives from companies like Brunei Shell Petroleum Company Sendiran Berhad, Brunei LNG Sendiran Berhad, Total Energies in Brunei, Serikandi Oilfield Services Sendiran Berhad and the Adinin Group of Companies. He also urged Bruneian business leaders to invest in the Philippines and consider it as their prime investment destination.

Marcos concluded his visit in Brunei Darussalam with the signing of the two agreements after leading the Philippine business forum. The President and the First Lady then proceeded to Singapore to address the 21st International Institute for Strategic Studies' Shangri-La Dialogue. They arrived at the Changi Airport around 4:52 p.m.

== Results ==
During the state visit, the Philippines and Brunei signed several agreements aimed to strengthening cooperation in tourism, maritime affairs, agriculture, and business. Among these was a memorandum of understanding (MoU) on tourism cooperation, which seeks to promote Halal and Muslim-friendly tourism, develop niche travel markets, and expand collaboration in areas such as training, airline connectivity, and medical tourism.

In the maritime sector, the two governments updated their existing arrangement on the mutual recognition of seafarer certifications, allowing both countries to recognize each other's standards and qualifications for seafarers. The Department of Agriculture of the Philippines and Brunei's Department of Agriculture and Agrifood likewise signed a letter of intent to explore joint projects to improve food security and advancing agricultural and agrifood technologies.

Business groups from both countries agreed to work together in supporting micro, small, and medium-sized enterprises (MSMEs), promoting sustainable agribusiness, and encouraging greater economic integration within the region. Another agreement between the Philippine Chamber of Commerce and Industry and Brunei's National Chamber of Commerce and Industry established mechanisms for trade missions and business cooperation in sectors such as information and communications technology, Halal food, and manufacturing.

Formal agreements signed during the state visit
| Agreement | Signatories / Agency | Objectives of the agreement | Ref. |
|---|---|---|---|
| MOU on Tourism Cooperation | Department of Tourism (DOT, Philippines) and Ministry of Primary Resources and Tourism (Brunei) | Promotes Halal and Muslim-friendly tourism, niche travel development, joint advertising, capacity training, airline cooperation, medical tourism, and more. | |
| MOU on Maritime Cooperation | Government of the Philippines and Government of Brunei | Enhances collaboration in maritime pollution control, skills training, and systematic research and information sharing. | |
| MOU on Mutual Recognition of STCW Certificates | Maritime Industry Authority (MARINA, Philippines) and Ministry of Transport and Infocommunications (Brunei) | Updates a 2001 pact, allowing both nations to recognize each other's national seafarer standards and certifications. | |
| Letter of Intent on Agricultural Cooperation | Department of Agriculture (DA, Philippines) and Department of Agriculture and Agrifood (Brunei) | Explores joint projects to secure food supplies and modernize farming and agrifood technologies. | |
| MOU for Partnership in Agriculture and MSMEs | ASEAN Business Advisory Councils of the Philippines and Brunei | Focuses on MSME development, sustainable agribusiness, and sub-regional economic integration. | |
| MOU on Economic Cooperation | PCCI and National Chamber of Commerce and Industry of Brunei Darussalam | Establishes business councils to facilitate joint trade missions and support sectors like ICT, Halal food, and manufacturing. | |

== Analysis and reactions ==
Prior to the visit, observers noted that the state visit formed part of a broader diplomatic engagement that included President Marcos' participation in the Shangri-La Dialogue in Singapore. Analysts pointed out the importance of the relations of the Philippines with Brunei in supporting regional stability, economic cooperation, and maritime collaboration within Southeast Asia and the wider Indo-Pacific region.

House Speaker Martin Romualdez welcomed the outcomes of the visit, stating that the agreements signed by the Philippines and Brunei would strengthen cooperation in tourism, agriculture, trade, and maritime affairs while creating additional opportunities for economic growth and investment.

Upon his return to the Philippines, President Marcos described the visit as productive, citing the signing of several agreements and the reaffirmation of bilateral ties between the two countries. He also emphasized the importance of continued cooperation in food security, trade, tourism, maritime affairs, and people-to-people exchanges.

=== South China Sea context ===
The state visit took place amid continuing tensions in the South China Sea. Although Brunei has generally maintained a cautious approach to its maritime dispute with China, both the Philippines and Brunei are claimant states in the area. Some observers noted that the signing of a memorandum of understanding on maritime cooperation reflected the two countries' interest in strengthening maritime collaboration and information-sharing.

Analysts stated that Manila could use the maritime cooperation and information sharing with Brunei to push for closer intraregional security cooperation, 'spearhead home-grown solutions' to South China Sea row.

On May 29, during the visit, Marcos also described China's plan to detain alleged foreign "trespassers" in the South China Sea as an "escalation" of tensions and a cause for concern.

== See also ==
- Brunei–Philippines relations
- List of international presidential trips made by Bongbong Marcos
