= ASEAN–European Union relations =

ASEAN – European Union
- European Union: ASEAN

The ASEAN–European Union relations are the bilateral foreign relations between two organisations: the European Union (EU) and the Association of Southeast Asian Nations (ASEAN). EU and ASEAN have been interacting with each other on the economic, trade, and political levels for more than four decades. The partnership between the EU and ASEAN dates back to 1972, when the EU (then known as the European Economic Community (EEC)) established ties with ASEAN. The EU became an ASEAN Dialogue Partner in 1977.

Relations between the two regions are expanding, developing progressively on the economic, political, and cultural fronts. Dialogue between the two regions has been enhanced with numerous technical level meetings and bi-annual ministerial meetings. Whereas in the past, much of the Europe – Southeast Asia relationship has focused on Southeast Asian development, the focus of cooperation has transformed to an emphasis on diplomacy, where the two sides discuss regional and international problems, and finally to a new emphasis on non-traditional risks, and regional integration support.

== Economic relations ==
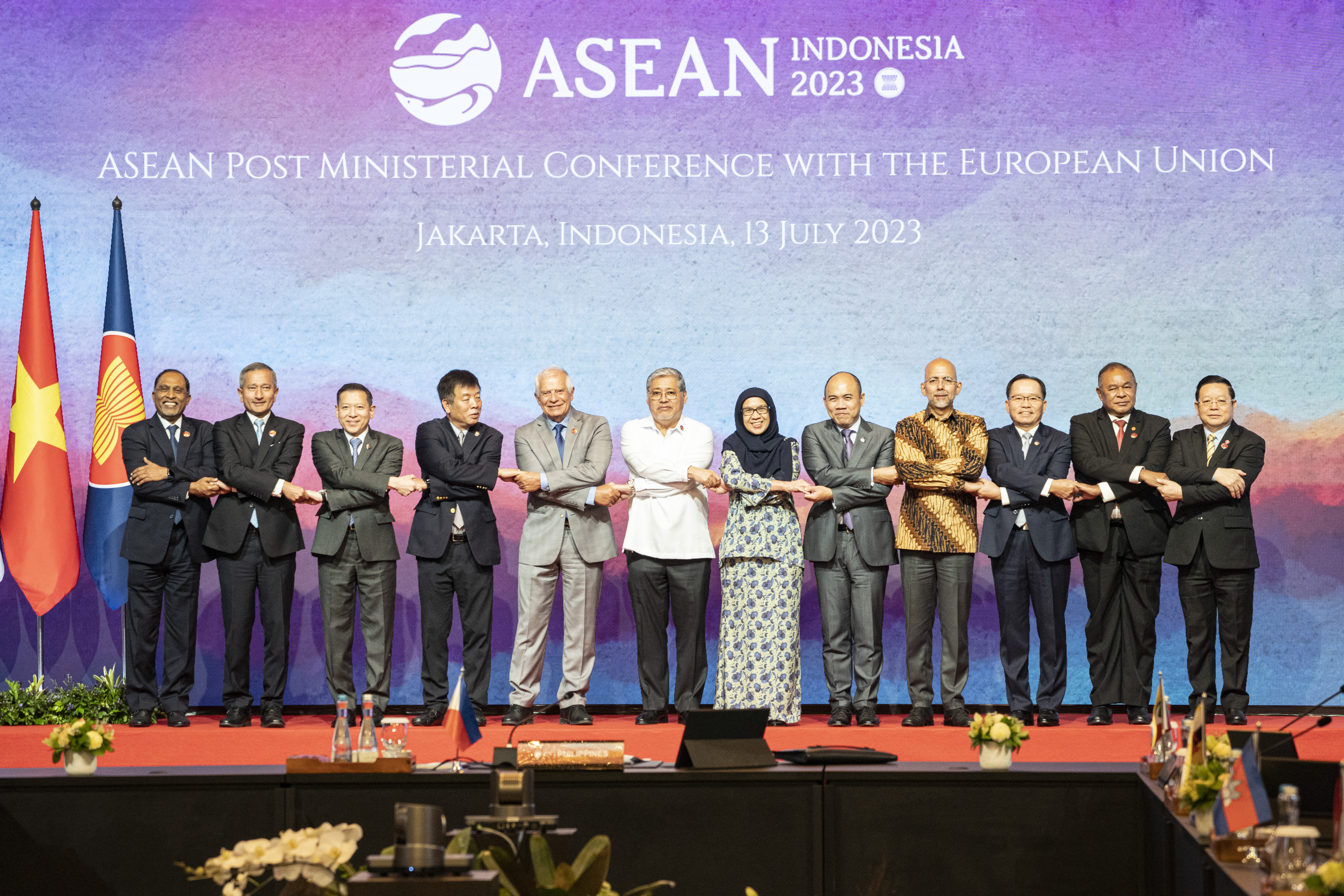
ASEAN-EU family portrait during ASEAN Post Ministerial Conference in Jakarta, Indonesia 2023

The European Union and the Association of Southeast Asian Nations enjoy robust commercial relations. The EU is ASEAN's third largest trading partner, while ASEAN is the EU's fifth largest trading partner. Total trade in 2011 in goods and services amounted to $265 billion. ASEAN had a surplus of $25 billion in its trade with the EU. The EU is the biggest provider of foreign direct investment into ASEAN, 24% of the total.

Trade has increased significantly over the past decades. EU exports to ASEAN were estimated at €45.7 billion in 1997, up from €8.9 billion in 1987. EU imports from ASEAN were valued at €10 billion in 1987, and had already surged to €46 billion by 1997. The structure of EU–ASEAN trade has undergone significant changes. In the past, EU exports to ASEAN have included a higher percentage of manufactured products. As ASEAN transforms from a commodity-producing region to a supplier of manufactured goods, there has been a dramatic shift in ASEAN's exports to the EU, from primary products to manufactures. Hence, ASEAN's exports consisted mostly of raw materials, such as wood, manioc, rubber, and palm oil. Today, electronic equipment, textiles, and clothing account for a larger share of exports. Trade in services between the two regions has also grown in recent years.

In order to further improve trade between the two regions, and to speed up ASEAN's economic integration, there is a regular dialogue at ministerial level and ASEAN–EU Business Summits are held on a regular basis. The first ASEAN–EU Business Summit was organised in Jakarta in May 2011, followed by a second Business Summit in April 2012 in Phnom Penh, and third one in Hanoi in March 2013. These meetings of business leaders, including small and medium-sized enterprises, with ASEAN trade ministers and the EU Trade Commissioner, generate a host of recommendations for both parties to facilitate trade. In 2007, the council authorised the commission to start negotiating a free trade agreement (FTA) with ASEAN. FTA negotiations were launched at the ASEAN–EU Economic Ministers (AEM) Consultations held in Brunei Darussalam in the same year. However, trade talks were moving relatively slowly, and eventually ground to a halt in 2009. The failed ASEAN–EU FTA paved the way for bilateral FTAs and negotiating Partnership and Cooperation Agreements (PCA) with individual ASEAN member states. The EU has concluded a free trade agreement with Singapore in 2012, and is negotiating FTAs with several other ASEAN countries (Vietnam, Thailand, and Malaysia). With Malaysia, negotiations are well advanced. These agreements are stepping stones to an overarching region-to-region agreement between the EU and ASEAN.

== Political relations ==
=== Historical overview ===
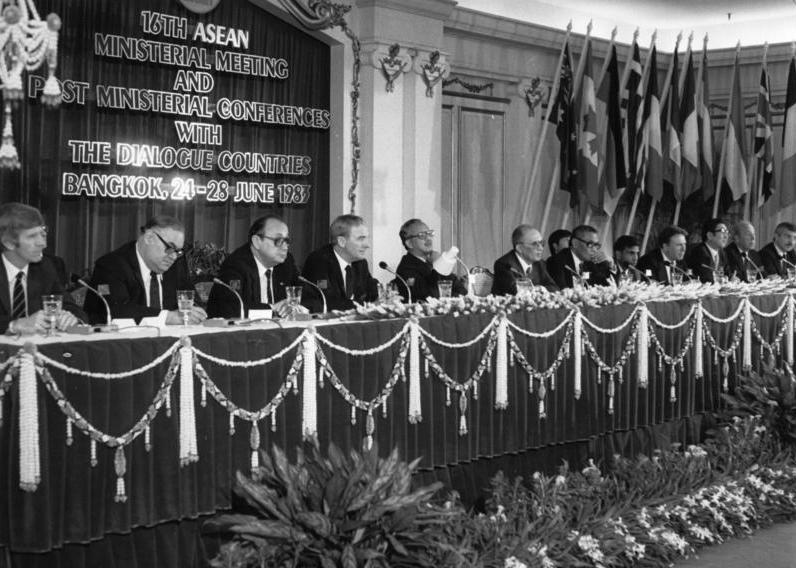
The 16th ASEAN Ministerial Meeting in Bangkok on 24 June 1983, addressed the situation in Kampuchea, was jointly held by the European Community.

Informal relations between the two regions were established in 1972, through the Special Coordinating Committee of ASEAN. In the same year, an ASEAN Brussels Committee (ABC) was set up to discuss commercial issues (the Generalised System of Preferences [GSP]) with the EEC. In 1975, relations were formalised through an ASEAN–EEC Joint Study Group, which was intended to oversee greater cooperation between the two sides.

After the announcement of the establishment of formal ASEAN–EC ties in 1977, a fully-fledged international dialogue began to emerge. The relationship was taken to a new level when the two regions' regular contacts were raised to the ministerial level. The first EEC–ASEAN ministerial meeting was held in Brussels in November 1978. Since then, the meetings have been held at intervals of about eighteen months. They are a key element in the expanding EU–ASEAN dialogue.

In March 1980, a cooperation agreement between the European Community and ASEAN countries was signed at the second EC–ASEAN ministerial meeting held in Kuala Lumpur. This agreement paved the way for closer economic and trade relations between the two sides. This framework agreement sets out objectives for commercial, economic, and development cooperation. It aims at promoting trade, investments, and business between the two regions.

ASEAN–EU relations were characterised by disputes in the 1990s. Human rights were one area of contention. East Timor and Burma were other areas of contention, which were resolved by turning them into bilateral issues between Indonesia and Portugal, and Burma and the EU, respectively, taking them out of any discussion between ASEAN and the EU. With East Timor's independence it ceased to be a burden in ASEAN–EU relations.

The EU–ASEAN dialogue was reinvigorated in 1994. Foreign ministers attending the 11th EU–ASEAN ministerial meeting in Germany created the Eminent Persons Group for a comprehensive approach to ASEAN–EU relations. It was agreed to develop a comprehensive approach to ASEAN–EU political and security, economic, and cultural relations towards the year 2000 and beyond.

In 1996, EU and ASEAN+3 (China, Japan, and South Korea) established the Asia–Europe Meeting (ASEM), and held the first summit in Thailand. The summit established a vast and ambitious programme for future EU–Asia cooperation in a number of areas, and new areas of cooperation were discussed, such as tackling global problems, and strengthening ASEAN's own regional integration initiatives.

In 2003, EU and ASEAN signed a Joint Declaration on Cooperation to Combat Terrorism at the 14th Ministerial Meeting in Brussels. As a consequence, anti-terrorism became high on the agenda.

In 2007, the Nuremberg Declaration on an enhanced EU–ASEAN partnership was signed, and in the same year, a plan of action to implement the declaration was adopted. The EU and its member states started appointing ambassadors as representatives to ASEAN in 2009, once the ASEAN charter was in place. Following the ASEAN charter, the EU and ASEAN set out to further expand cooperation.

In 2011, the first ASEAN–EU Business Summit (AEBS) was held.

=== Recent developments ===
Momentum has been building up over the last years in the EU–ASEAN relationship. Foreign ministers of ASEAN and the EU adopted the Bandar Seri Begawan Plan of Action 2013-2017, defining ASEAN–EU cooperation for this period.

Both 2012 and 2013 have seen an unprecedented number of visits by top-level EU officials to ASEAN and its member states: by Presidents Van Rompuy and Barroso, high representative Ashton, and several commissioners; as well as a marked rise in the visits by EU Member States. In July 2012, high representative Ashton signed the EU's accession to ASEAN's Treaty of Amity and Cooperation.

The EU is an active member of the ASEAN Regional Forum (ARF). The EU and Myanmar co-chaired the ARF Inter-Sessional Support Group on Confidence Building Measures, and the related Defence Officials Dialogue for the year 2013–2014.

In 2012 and 2013, high representative Ashton attended the ASEAN Regional Forum Meeting at ministerial level. The EU and ASEAN have an intensifying dialogue on human rights. In May 2013, EU Special Representative for Human Rights Stavros Lambrinidis met the ASEAN Intergovernmental Commission on Human Rights, while the same commission is expected to visit the EU institutions soon on their second visit. Dialogue and cooperation is also starting in several security-related fields.

== EU–ASEAN development cooperation ==
The EU is a major development partner of ASEAN. ASEAN benefits from programme cooperation funded by a variety of EU sources. Programmes are financed by the EU through a variety of sources, ranging from the regional budgets to specific budgets. Part of the EU–ASEAN cooperation is delivered through EU support programmes. In the period 2007–2013, the EU is providing €70 million at the regional level through the ASEAN secretariat. This amount is likely to increase in the coming period running from 2014 to 2020. The EU is the biggest donor to the ASEAN.

The EU launched its third programme supporting the creation of the ASEAN Community set to be achieved by 2015. It directly supports ASEAN in its efforts to implement the three blueprints for the three Communities (Economic community, Political and Security Community, and the Socio-Cultural Community) in the ASEAN charter.

Facilitating the ASEAN economic community has been a natural focus for EU–ASEAN programmes since the 1990s. For instance, a new EU programme will support the building of the ASEAN 'single market and production base' through the implementation of measures that will facilitate the free movement of goods across the ASEAN region, and, ultimately, enhance ASEAN connectivity (EU ARISE programme, €15 million, 2012 - 2015). There is also an EU–ASEAN Migration and Border Management Programme, aimed at increasing the exchange of information between immigration officials in ASEAN capitals, and supports the easing of visa requirements for ASEAN and non-ASEAN nationals within the region.

Providing support to ASEAN's Socio-Cultural community constitutes a relatively new but growing area of EU–ASEAN cooperation. For instance, there is an increasing exchange of students and scholars between the two regions. Each year, around 250 ASEAN students receive scholarships under the EU Erasmus Mundus programme, and around 25 ASEAN scholars a year benefit from Marie Curie Fellowships. Adding to this the many scholarships provided by EU Member States, more than 4,000 ASEAN students per year travel to Europe on EU scholarships.

ASEAN's political and security community is also supported, for instance, through an EU–ASEAN Migration and Border Management Programme. Improved border management should lead to easier and faster crossing of borders both for persons and goods, while at the same time, ensuring better control of transnational crime, illegal migration, and the trafficking of human beings.

Through a number of world-wide EU programmes, ASEAN and the EU cooperate in the areas of energy and climate change, the protection of biodiversity, and the promotion of good governance. For instance, the Global Climate Change Alliance (GCCA) was created as an EU initiative to step up cooperation and dialogue between the EU and the developing countries that are hit earliest and hardest by climate change and have the least capacity to react.

The EU is also involved in disaster response and disaster preparedness. This work is primarily undertaken by the humanitarian office of the EU – ECHO. ECHO provided €299 million to the ASEAN region, to bring relief to millions of people whose lives were affected by natural disasters, epidemics, and conflicts. Humanitarian aid is provided in a variety of forms, depending on the nature of the crisis. It can range from food, clothes, healthcare, shelter, water and sanitation, to emergency repairs to infrastructure, demining actions, psychological support, and education. To anticipate the consequences of future disasters, the EU also funds disaster preparedness projects in the region.

== Organisations comparison ==
	ASEAN	European Union
flag	ASEAN	European Union
motto	One Vision, One Identity, One Community	In Varietate Concordia
anthem	The ASEAN Way	Anthem of Europe
area	4,479,210 square kilometres (1,729,430 square miles)	4,233,262 square kilometres (1,634,472 square miles)
capital	Jakarta, Indonesia	Brussels, Belgium
Global cities	Singapore, Jakarta, Kuala Lumpur, Bangkok, Manila	Paris, Amsterdam, Milan, Frankfurt, Madrid, Brussels
established	8 August 1967 (declaration); 20 November 2007 (chartered)	25 March 1957 (foundation); 7 February 1992 (integrated)
population	667.3 million	447.7 million
population density	144 per square kilometre (373.0 per square mile)	106 per square kilometre (274.5 per square mile)
working language(s)	English	English, French, German
GDP (PPP)	$10.96 trillion	$20.91 trillion
HDI	0.723 (2018)	0.899 (2018)
