= Filipinos in Thailand =

- (Philippines) (Thailand)

Total population
- 32,950 (as of June 2024)

Regions with significant populations
- Bangkok, Chonburi Province, Chiang Rai Province

Languages
- Tagalog, English, Philippine languages, Thai

Religion
- Predominantly Roman Catholicism; Buddhism, Islam

Related ethnic groups
- Filipino people, Overseas Filipinos

Filipinos in Thailand are either migrants or descendants of migrants from the Philippines. They are most likely married with Thais and settle in Thailand for many years. Nowadays, more Filipinos going to Thailand to work as overseas Filipino workers. Most of them are working as English teachers. There are many Filipino community groups and associations.

== Notable people ==
- Christina Aguilar (born 1966), Thai singer (father is Spanish-Filipino and mother is Franco-Vietnamese)
- Robert Joseph Cespedes (born 1954), also known as Toon Hiranyasap, Thai actor (father is Spanish-Filipino)
- Johnny Anfone (born 1969), Thai actor (father is Filipino and mother is Thai-German)
- Billy Mittakarin Ogan (born 1966), Thai actor and Thai singer (father is Filipino and mother is Thai)
- Milagros Atienza Jimena, also known as Maliwan Jimena, Thai singer (Filipino parents)
- Oranate D. Caballes, Thai actress and Thai badminton players. (father is Filipino and mother is Lahu)
- Wipawee D. Caballes, Thai downhill mountain biker (father is Filipino and mother is Thai)

== See also ==
- Philippines–Thailand relations
- Filipino diaspora
- Ethnic groups in Thailand
