= Eighteenth East Asia Summit =

2023 conference in Jakarta, Indonesia

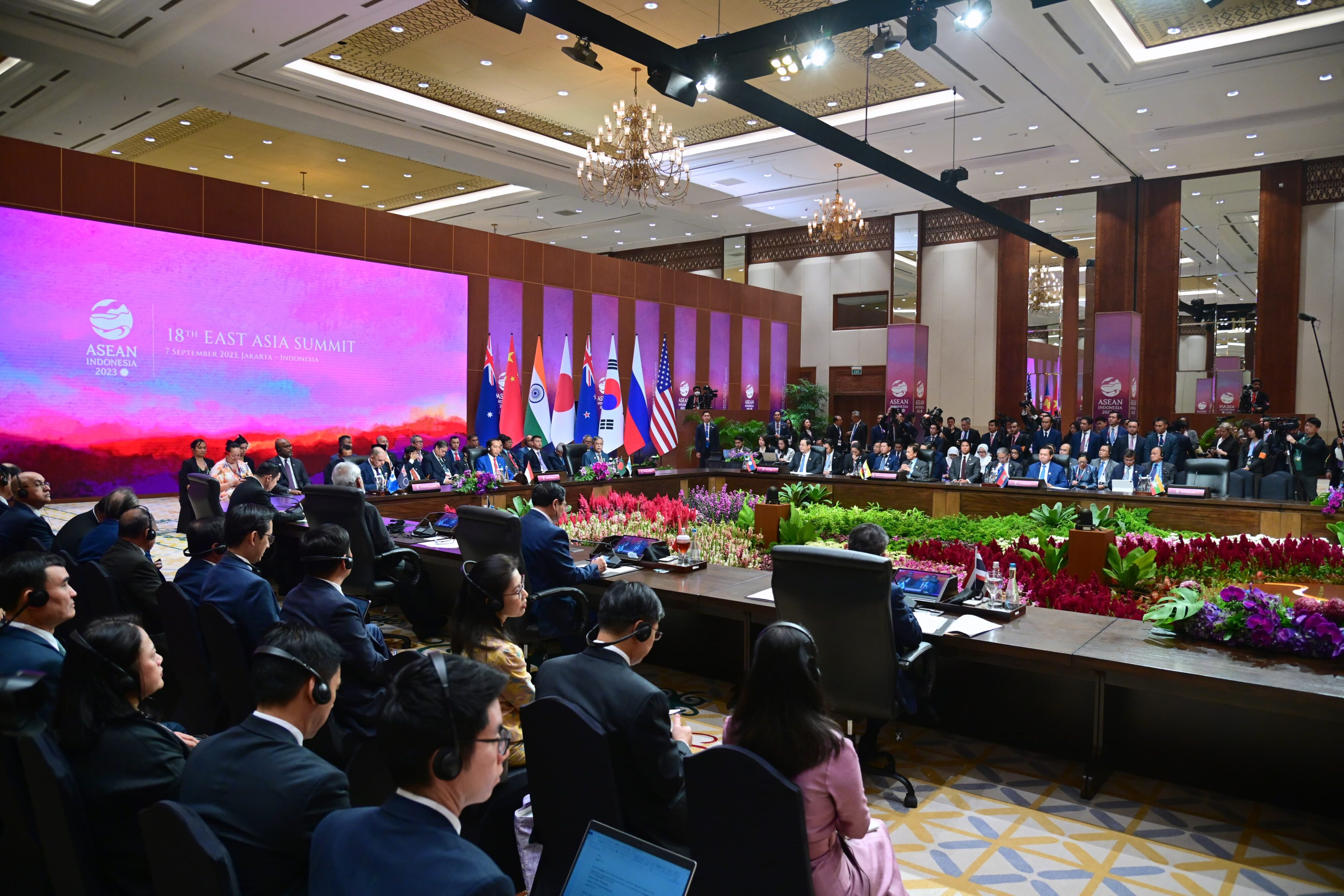
- Host country: Indonesia
- Date: 6–7 September 2023
- Cities: Jakarta
- Venues: Jakarta Convention Center
- Participants: EAS members
- Follows: Seventeenth East Asia Summit
- Precedes: Nineteenth East Asia Summit

The Eighteenth East Asia Summit was held in Jakarta, Indonesia on 6–7 September 2023. The East Asia Summit is an annual meeting of national leaders from the East Asian region and adjoining countries. EAS has evolved as forum for strategic dialogue and cooperation on political, security and economic issues of common regional concern and plays an important role in the regional architecture.

== Attending delegations ==
The heads of state and heads of government of the seventeen countries participated in the summit. The host of the 2023 East Asian Summit is also the Chairperson of ASEAN, the President of Indonesia, Joko Widodo.

=== Gallery ===
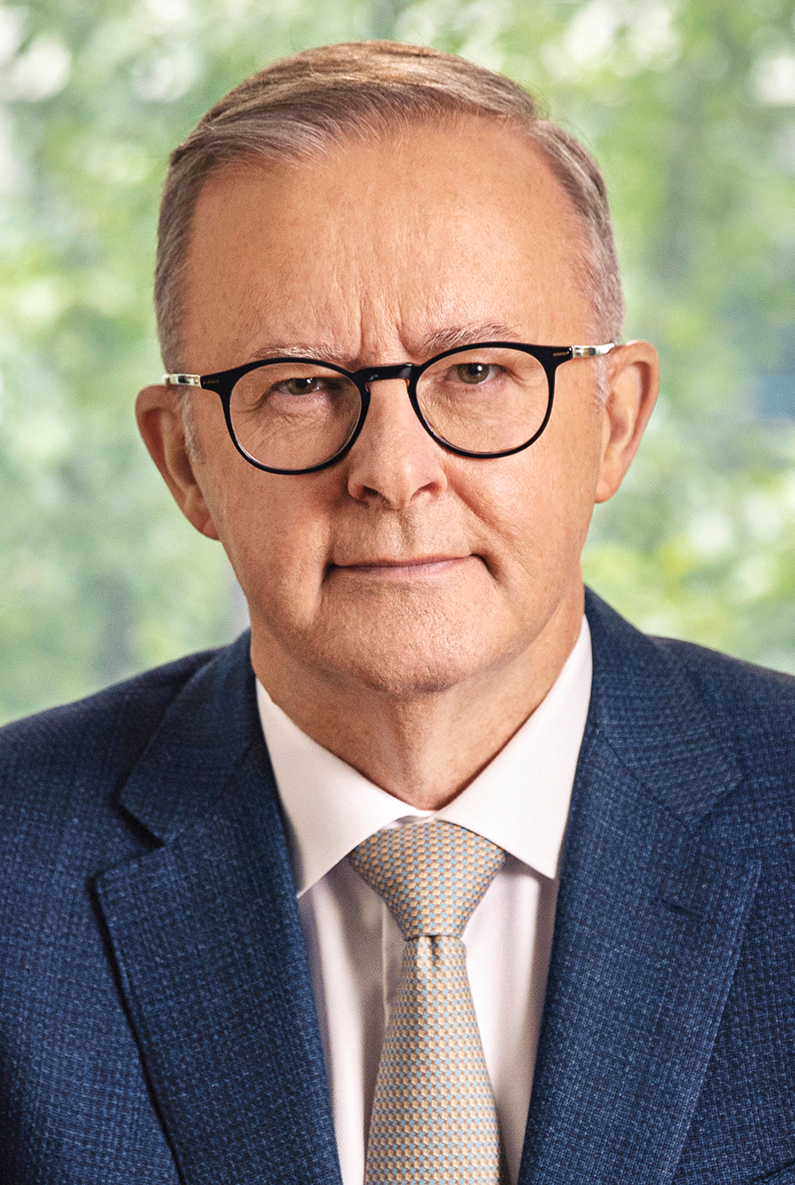
Australia
Prime Minister Anthony Albanese

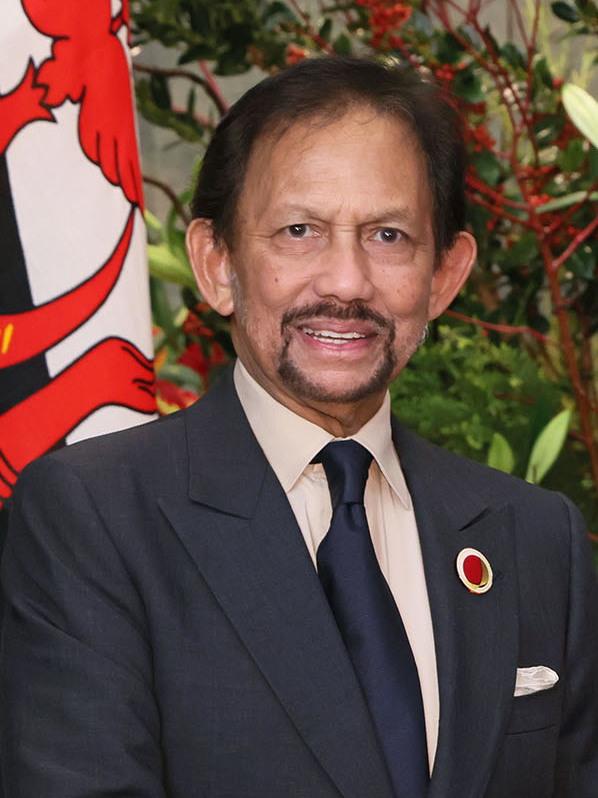
Brunei
Sultan Hassanal Bolkiah

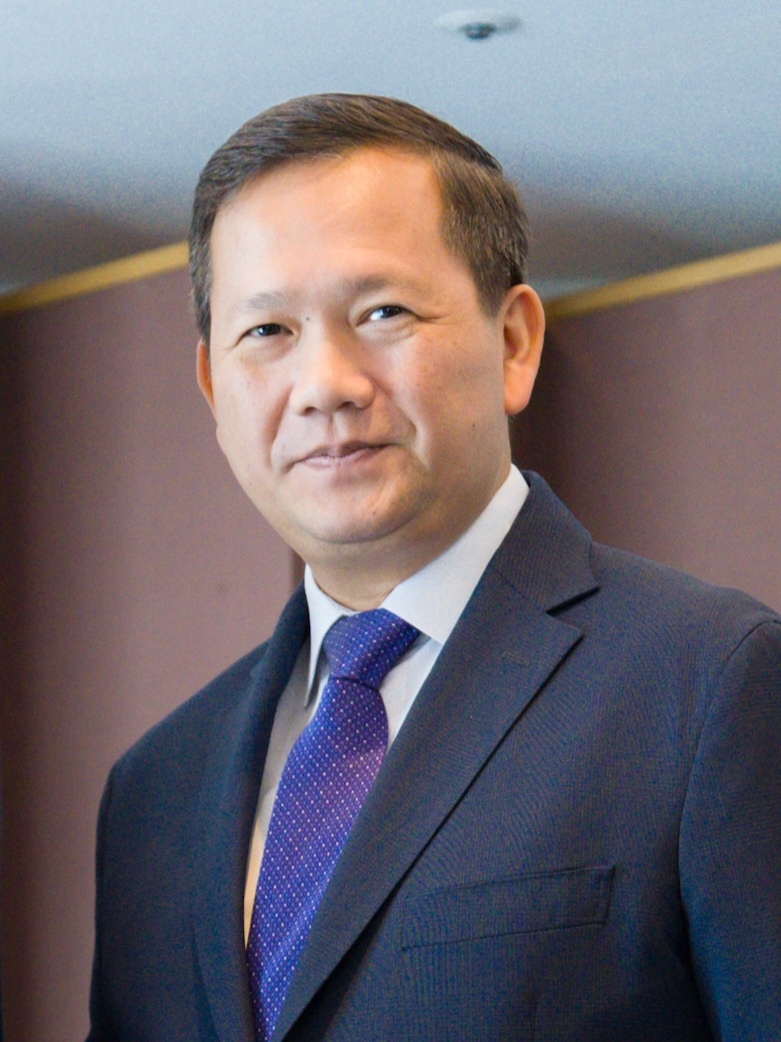
Cambodia
Prime Minister Hun Manet

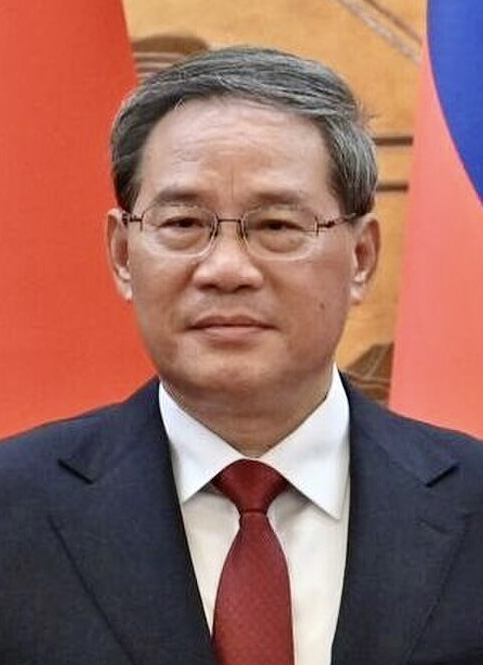
(China) China
Premier Li Qiang

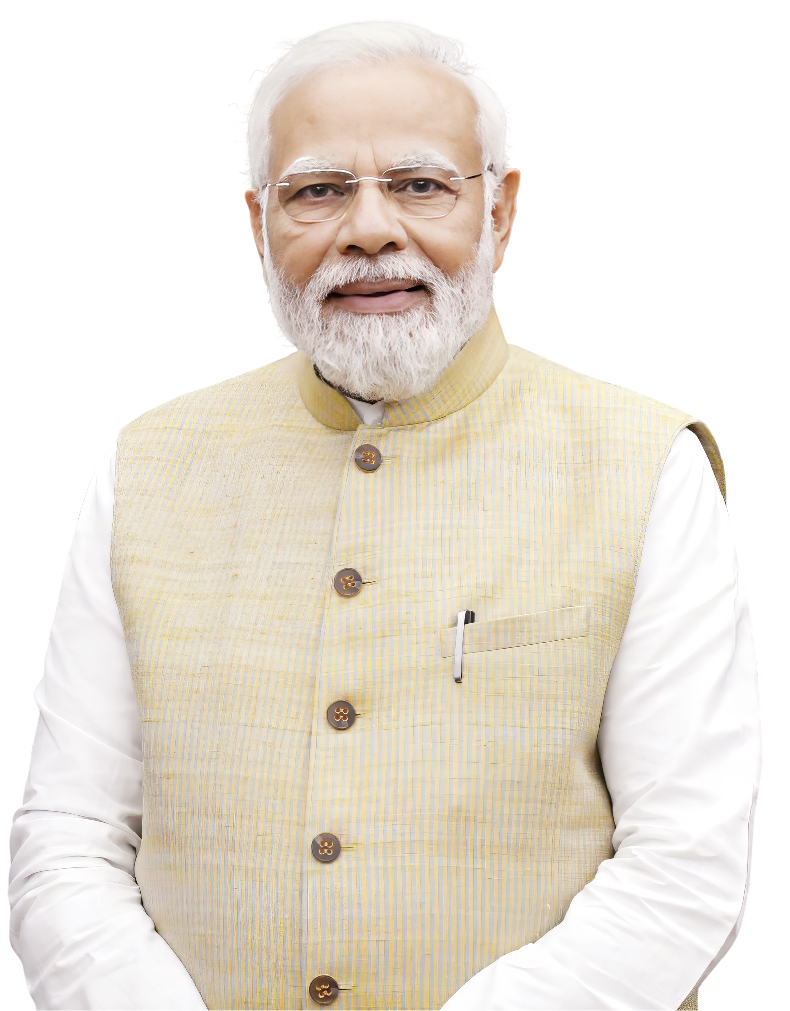
(India) India
Prime Minister Narendra Modi

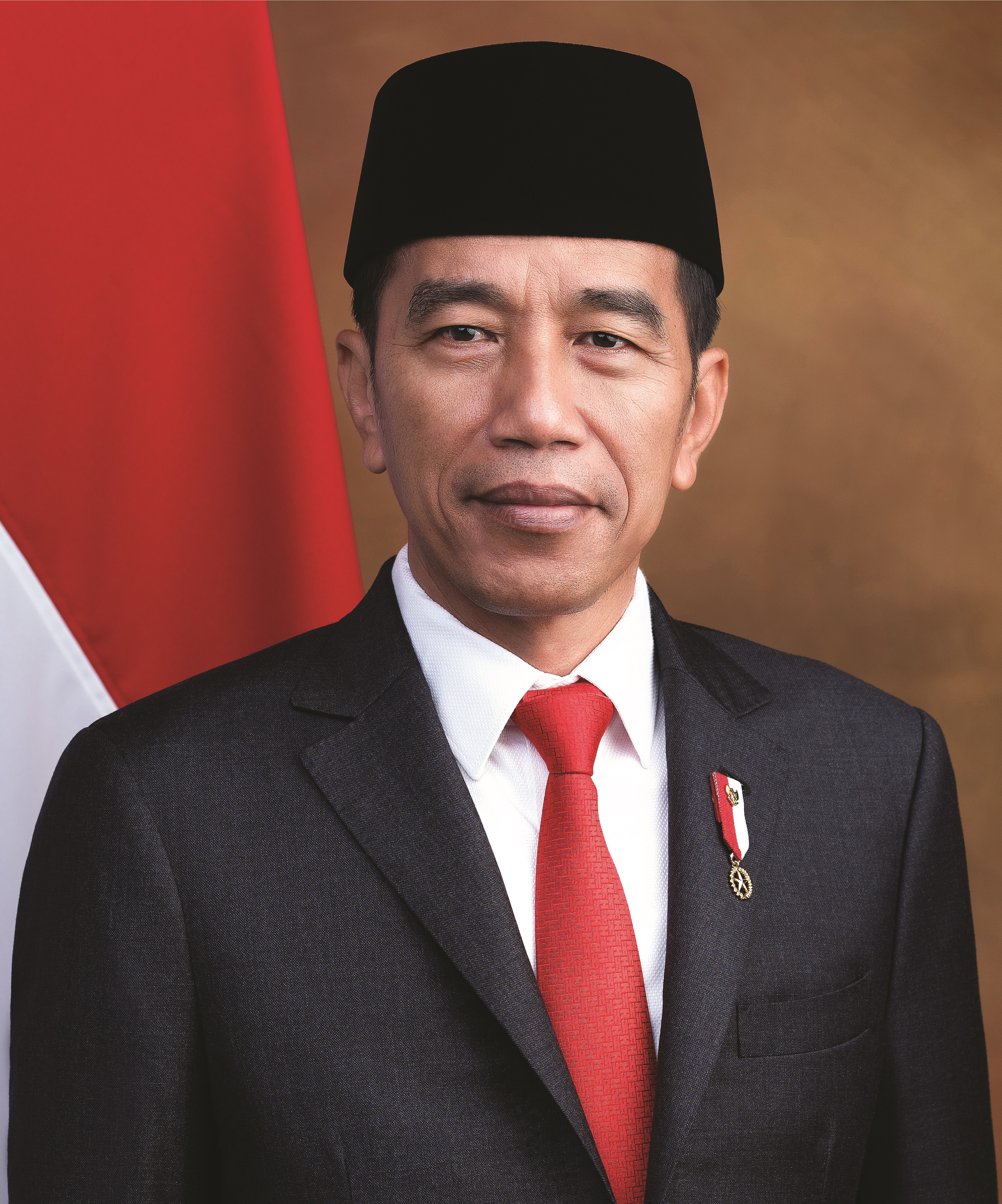
(Indonesia) Indonesia
President Joko Widodo (chairperson)

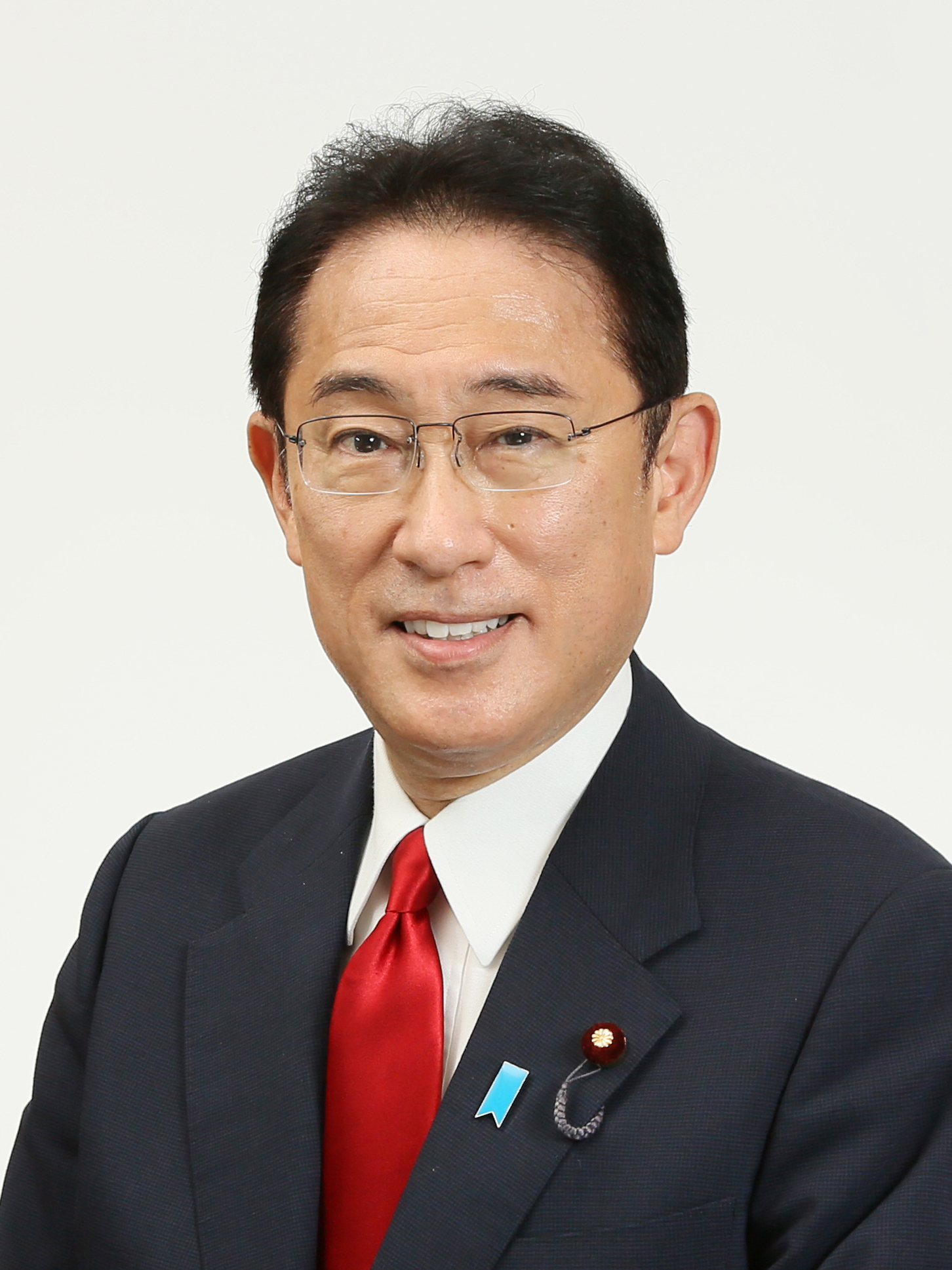
(Japan) Japan
Prime Minister Fumio Kishida

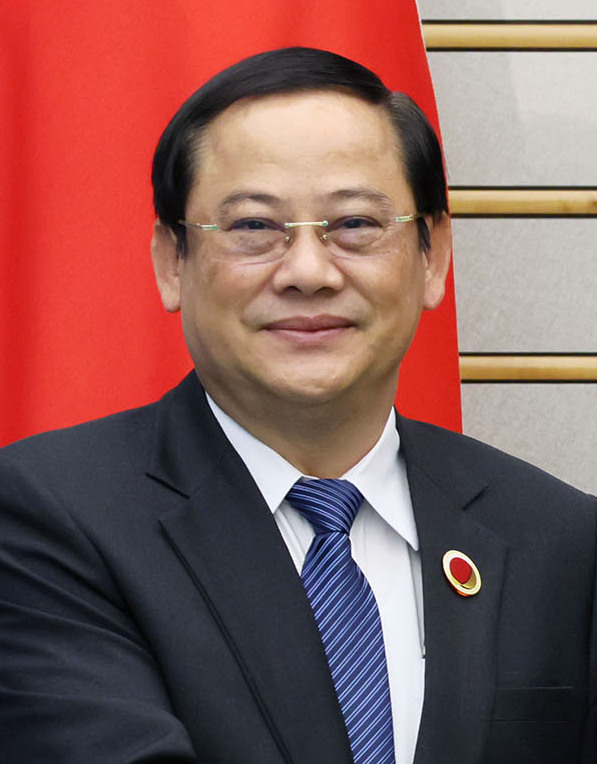
(Laos) Laos
Prime Minister Sonexay Siphandone

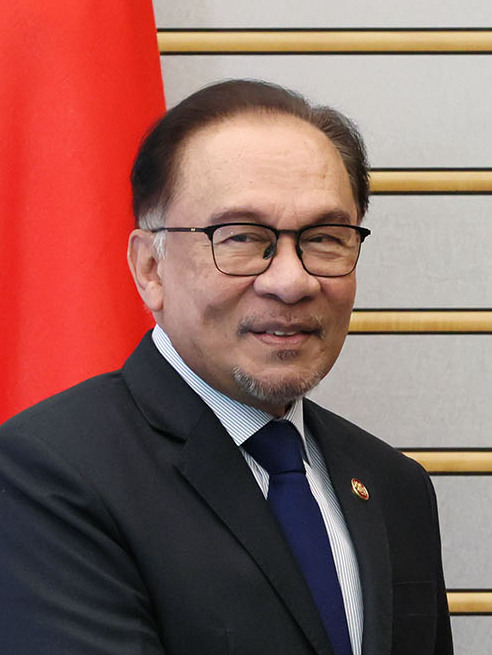
(Malaysia) Malaysia
Prime Minister Anwar Ibrahim

(Myanmar) Myanmar
Prime Minister Min Aung Hlaing was excluded from participating
Seat reserved

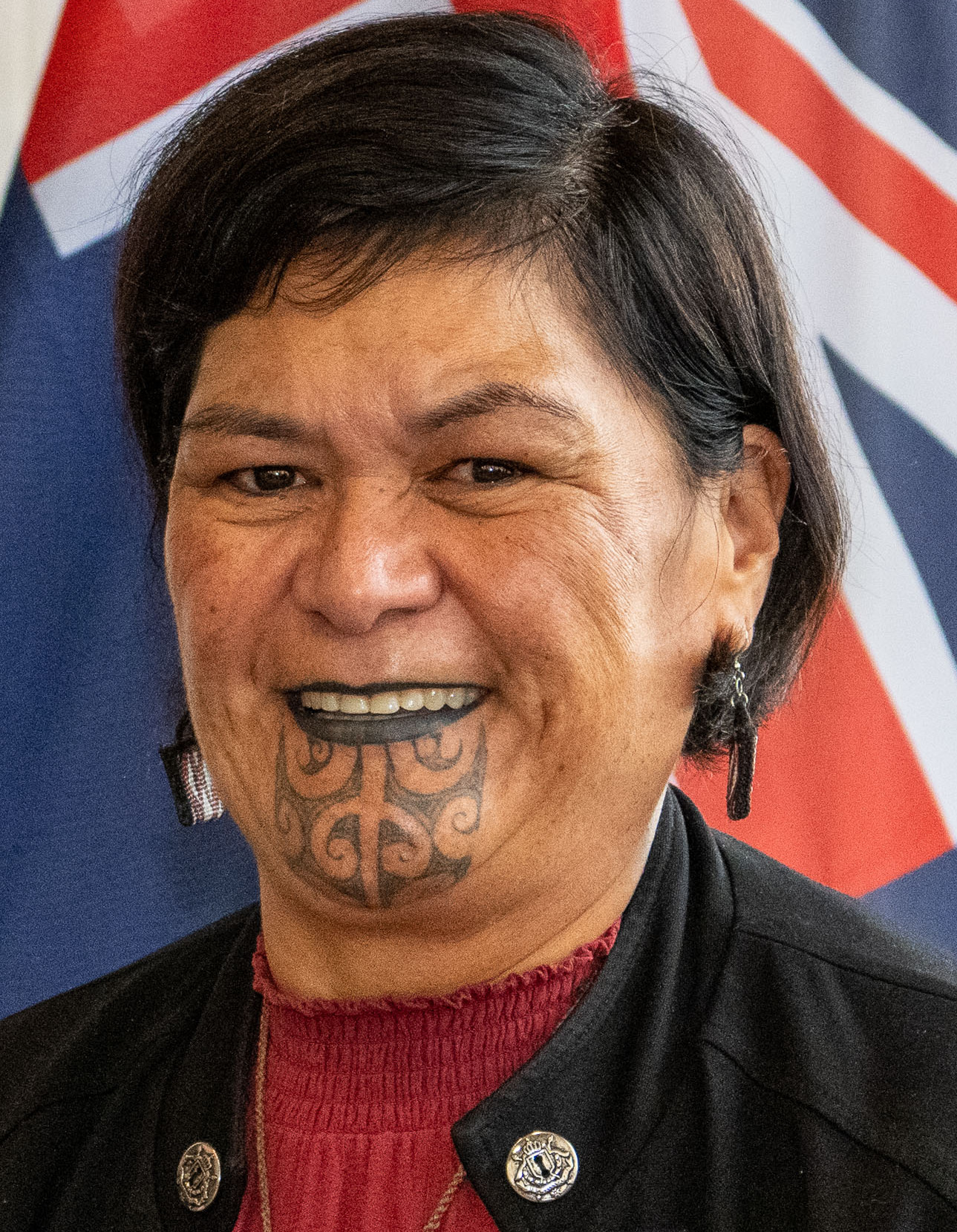
(New Zealand) New Zealand
Foreign Minister Nanaia Mahuta

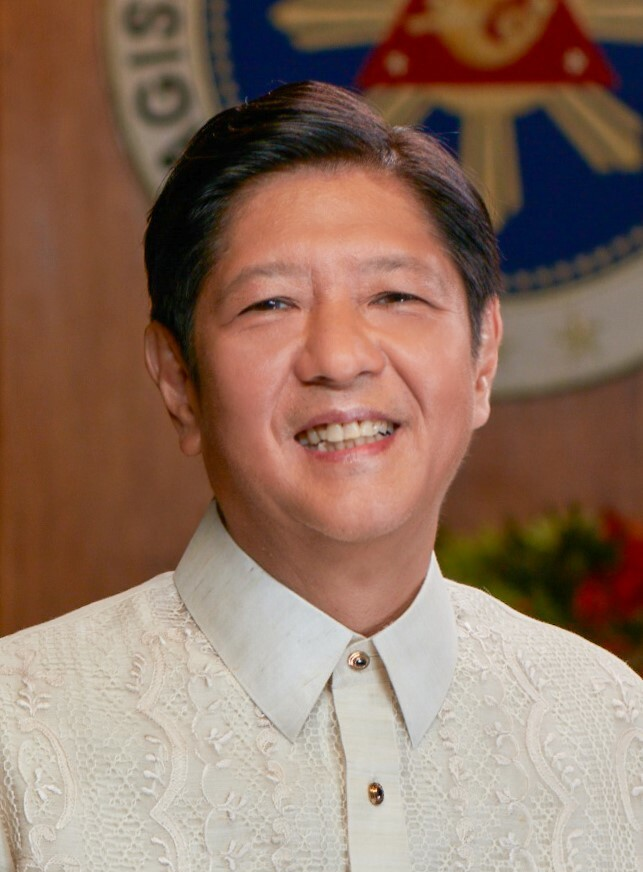
(Philippines) Philippines
President Bongbong Marcos

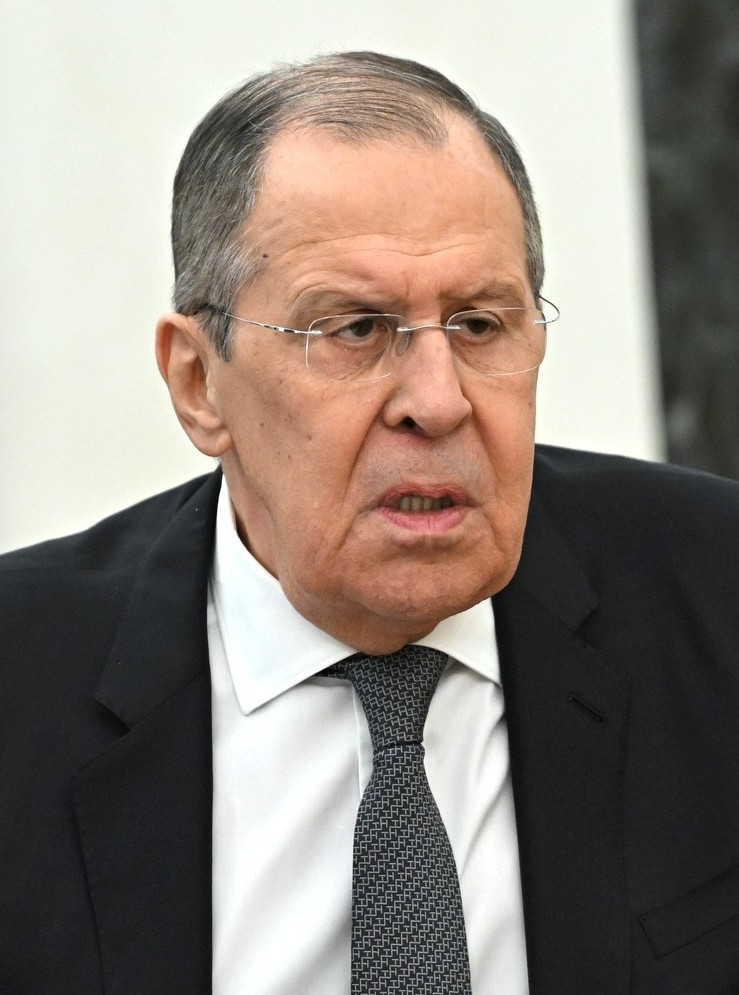
(Russia) Russia
Foreign Minister Sergey Lavrov

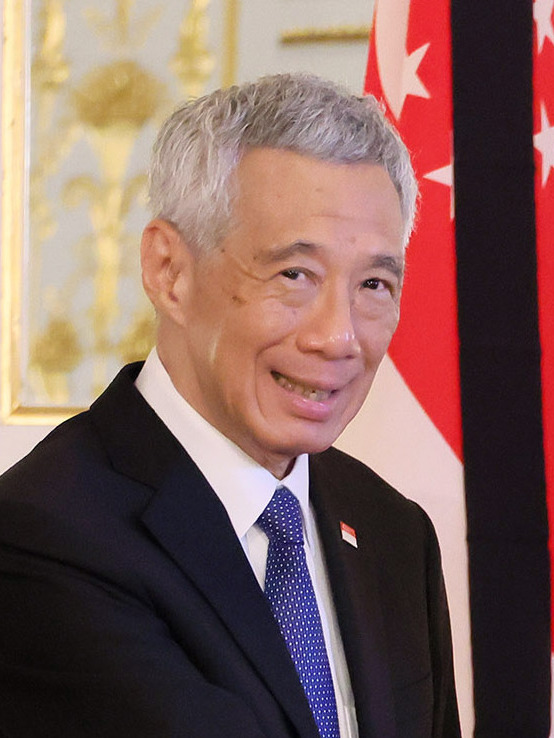
(Singapore) Singapore
Prime Minister Lee Hsien Loong

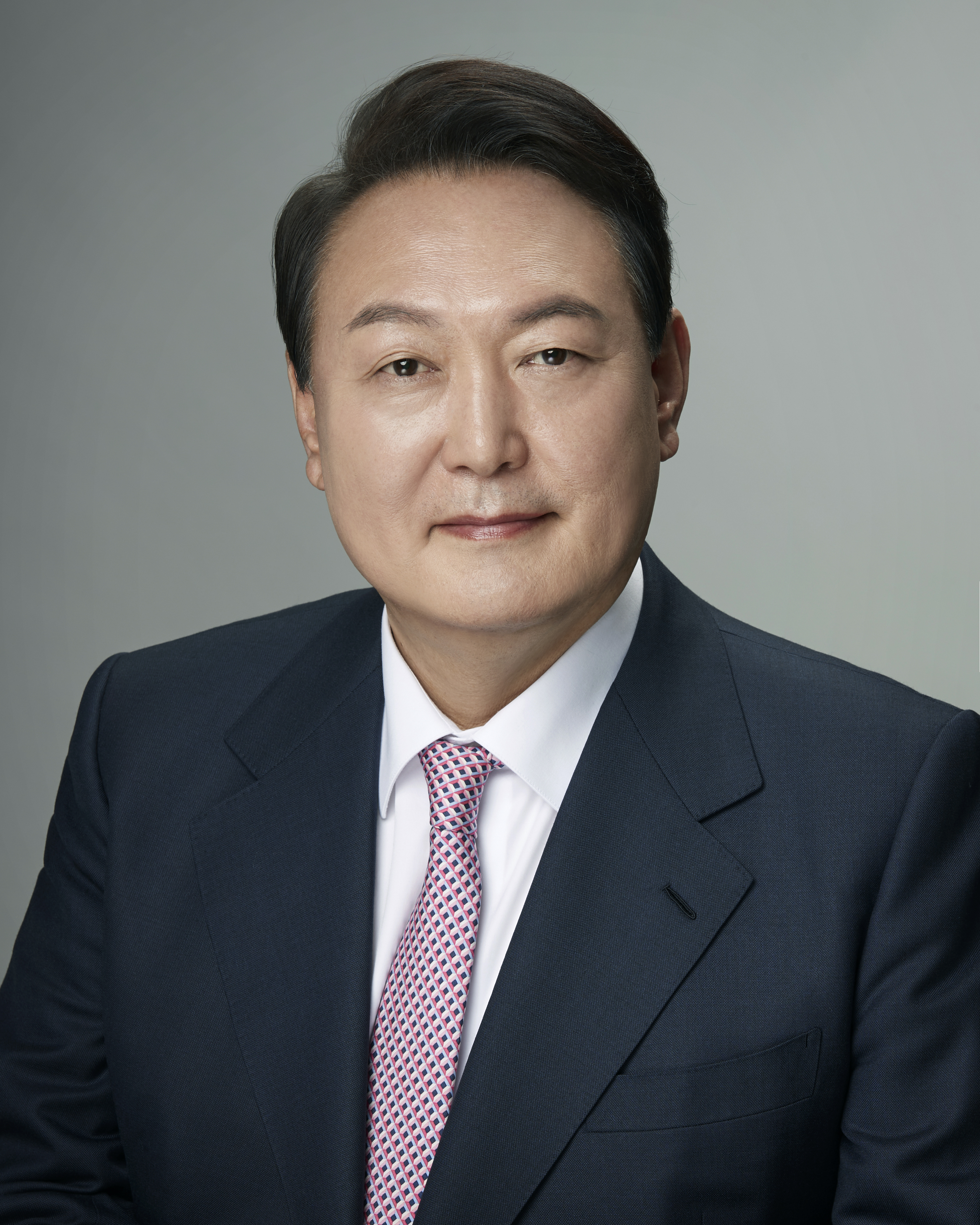
(South Korea) South Korea
President Yoon Suk-yeol

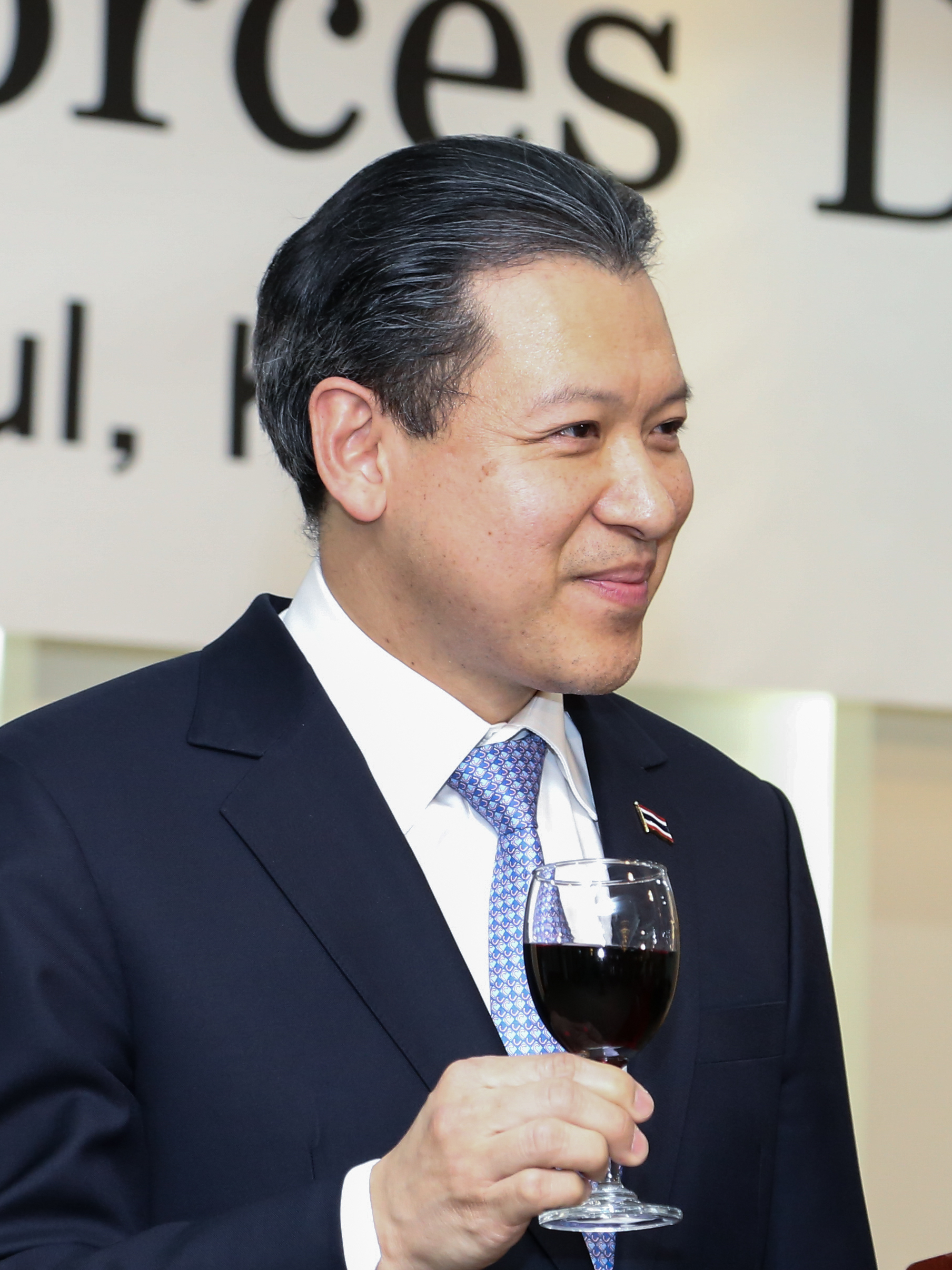
(Thailand) Thailand
Permanent Secretary Sarun Charoensuwan

(United States) United States
Vice President Kamala Harris

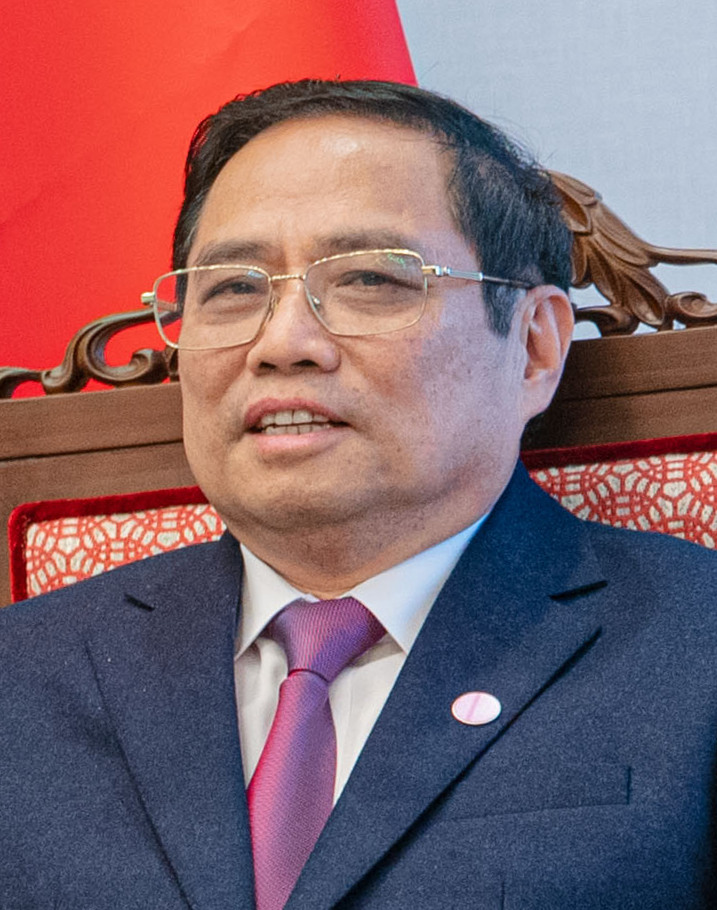
(Vietnam) Vietnam
Prime Minister Phạm Minh Chính

=== Guest invitees ===
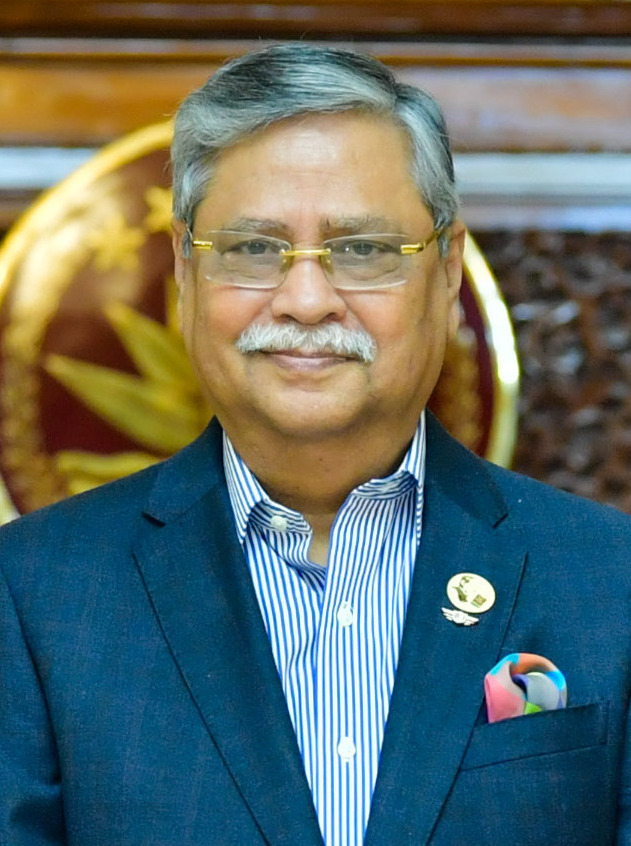
(Bangladesh) Bangladesh
President Mohammed Shahabuddin

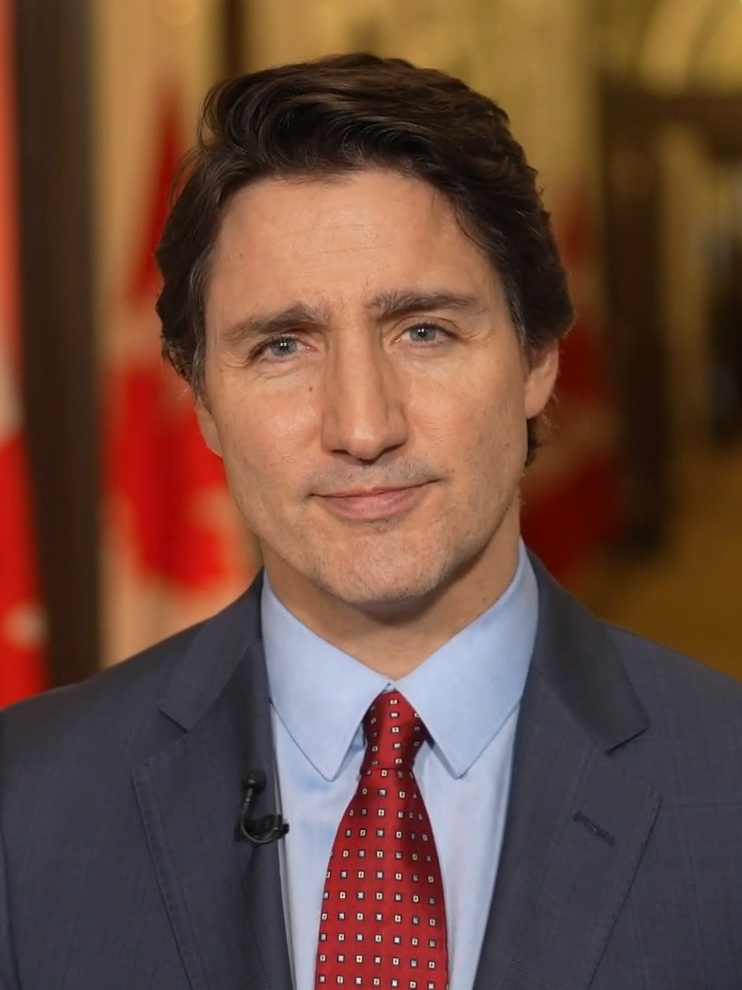
(Canada) Canada
Prime Minister Justin Trudeau

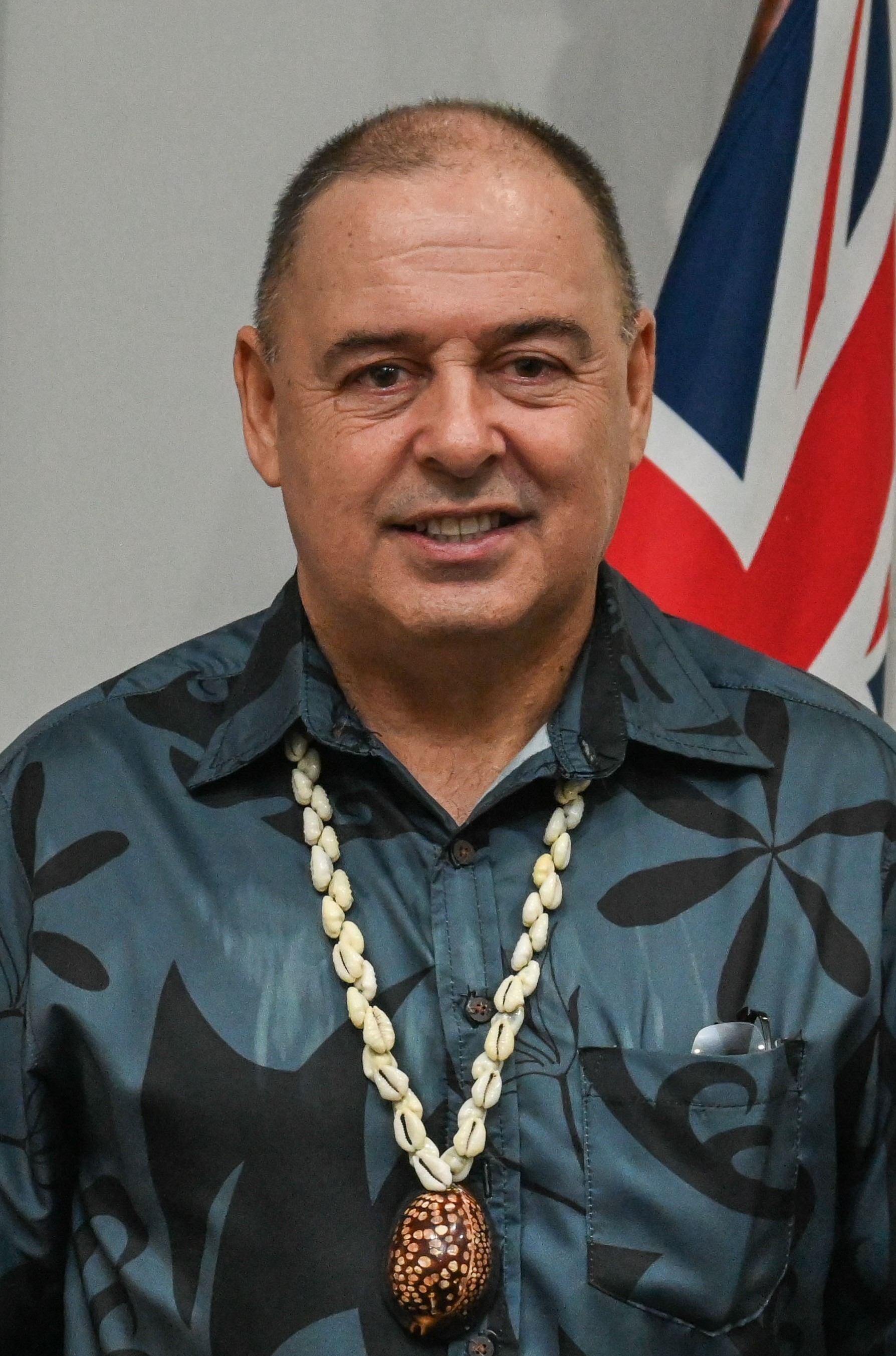
(Cook Islands) Cook Islands
Prime Minister Mark Brown

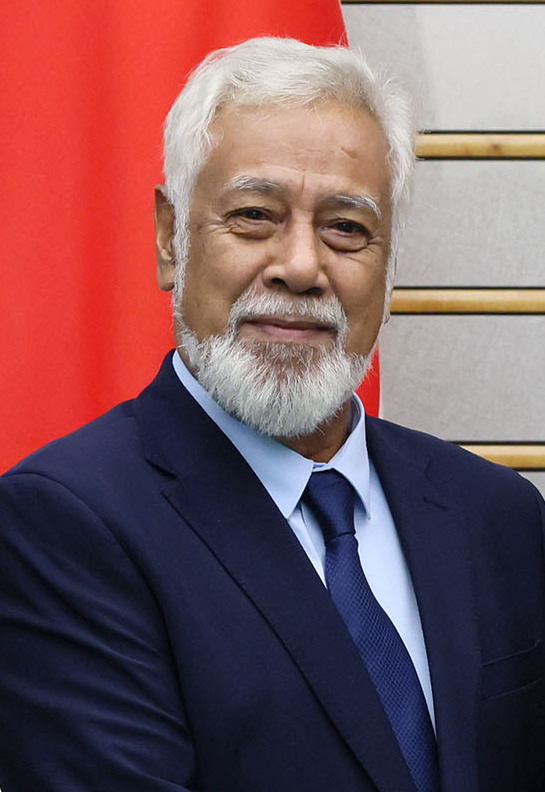
(Timor-Leste) East Timor
Prime Minister Xanana Gusmão
