= List of international presidential trips made by Yoon Suk Yeol =

This is a list of international presidential trips made by Yoon Suk Yeol, the 13th president of South Korea. Yoon Suk Yeol has made 21 international trips to 27 countries during his presidency, which began on 10 May 2022 and ended with his removal from office on 4 April 2025.

On 9 December 2024, South Korea's Ministry of Justice issued an overseas travel ban against Yoon following an investigation into allegations of rebellion linked to his brief imposition of martial law.

== Summary ==
The number of visits per country where President Yoon travelled are:

- One visit to: Brazil, Cambodia, Canada, Czech Republic, India, Kazakhstan, Laos, Lithuania, Netherlands, Peru, Philippines, Poland, Qatar, Saudi Arabia, Singapore, Spain, Switzerland, Turkmenistan, Ukraine, United Arab Emirates, Uzbekistan and Vietnam
- Two visits to: France, Indonesia, Japan and the United Kingdom
- Five visits to: the United States

Map of international trips made by Yoon Suk-yeol as president: South Korea 1 visit 2 visits 5 visits

=== 2022 ===
#	Country	Areas visited	Dates	Details	Image
1	Spain	Madrid	27–30 June	Yoon attended the NATO summit.	
2	United Kingdom	London	18–19 September	Yoon attended the state funeral of Queen Elizabeth II at Westminster Abbey.	
2	United States	New York City	20–21 September	Yoon attended the UN General Assembly and Global Fund's Seventh Replenishment Conference.	
2	Canada	Ottawa	22–23 September	Working visit. Yoon met with Prime Minister Justin Trudeau.	
3	Cambodia	Phnom Penh	11–13 November	Yoon attended the East Asia Summit, ASEAN-Korea Summit, and ASEAN+3 Summit.	
3	Indonesia	Bali	13–16 November	Yoon attended the G20 summit.	

=== 2023 ===
#	Country	Areas visited	Dates	Details	Image
4	United Arab Emirates	Abu Dhabi	14–17 January	State visit. Yoon met with President Mohamed bin Zayed Al Nahyan.	
4	Switzerland	Davos	17–21 January	Yoon attended the World Economic Forum.	
5	Japan	Tokyo	16–17 March	Working visit. Yoon met with Prime Minister Fumio Kishida.	
6	United States	Washington, D.C.	24–29 April	State visit. Yoon met with President Joe Biden.	
7	Japan	Hiroshima	19–21 May	Working visit. Yoon attended the G7 summit.	
8	France	Paris	20–21 June	Working visit. Yoon attended the 172nd general assembly of the Bureau International des Expositions (BIE). Met with President Emmanuel Macron.	
8	Vietnam	Hanoi	22–24 June	State visit. Yoon met with President Võ Văn Thưởng.	
9	Lithuania	Vilnius	10–12 July	Yoon attended the NATO summit.	
9	Poland	Warsaw	12–14 July	Official visit. Yoon met with President Andrzej Duda.	
9	Ukraine	Kyiv	15 July	Main article: 2023 visit by Yoon Suk Yeol to Ukraine Unannounced visit. Yoon met with President Volodymyr Zelenskyy.	
10	United States	Camp David	18 August	Working visit. Yoon attended the United States–Japan–South Korea trilateral summit with President Joe Biden and Japanese Prime Minister Fumio Kishida.	
11	Indonesia	Jakarta	5–7 September	Yoon attended the East Asia Summit, ASEAN-Korea Summit, and ASEAN+3 Summit.	
11	India	New Delhi	9–10 September	Yoon attended the G20 summit.	
12	United States	New York City	18–22 September	Yoon attended the UN General Assembly.	
13	Saudi Arabia	Riyadh	22–24 October	State visit. Yoon met with Crown Prince Mohammed bin Salman.	
13	Qatar	Doha	25–26 October	State visit. Yoon met with Emir Tamim bin Hamad Al Thani.	
14	United States	San Francisco	15–17 November	Yoon attended the APEC summit.	
15	United Kingdom	London	20–23 November	State visit. Yoon met with King Charles III and Prime Minister Rishi Sunak.	
15	France	Paris	23–25 November	Working visit. Yoon met with President Emmanuel Macron.	
16	Netherlands	Amsterdam	11–14 December	State visit. Yoon met with King Willem-Alexander and Prime Minister Mark Rutte.	

=== 2024 ===
#	Country	Areas visited	Dates	Details	Image
17	Turkmenistan	Ashgabat	10–11 June	State visit.	
17	Kazakhstan	Astana	11–13 June	State visit.	
17	Uzbekistan	Tashkent	13–15 June	State visit.	
18	United States	Hawaii, Washington, D.C.	8–12 July	Yoon attended the NATO summit.	
19	Czech Republic	Prague	19–22 September	Official visit. The leaders of the two countries agreed to deepen cooperation in various areas, including the Dukovany Nuclear Power Station and economic cooperation.	
20	Philippines	Manila	6–7 October	State visit. Yoon met with President Bongbong Marcos. Laid a wreath at the Libingan ng mga Bayani to honor Filipino Korean War victims and met surviving veterans of the Philippine Expeditionary Forces to Korea. Hosted to a state luncheon by President Marcos and First Lady Liza Araneta Marcos at the Malacañang Palace. Agreed to upgrade bilateral relations to a "strategic partnership" level as part of the 75th anniversary of diplomatic relations. 20 memoranda of understanding (MOUs) were signed, including a feasibility study on reviving the long-dormant Bataan Nuclear Power Plant. Delivered a keynote speech at the Philippines–Korea Business Forum at the Manila Hotel, where he stayed.	
20	Singapore	Singapore	8–9 October	State visit. Yoon met with President Tharman Shanmugaratnam. Hosted to lunch by Prime Minister Lawrence Wong and to a State Banquet by President Tharman. Met with President Tharman, Prime Minister Wong and Senior Minister Lee Hsien Loong. Agreed to upgrade bilateral relations to a "Strategic Partnership" Level as part of 50th Anniversary of diplomatic relations. 6 MOUs including Treaty of Extradition, Supply Chain Partnership Agreement, MOUs in Cooperation in the Field of Food Safety, Field of Liquified Natural Gas, SME and Start-up cooperation and Technological Cooperation were signed.	
20	Laos	Vientiane	10–11 October	Yoon attended the East Asia Summit, ASEAN-Korea Summit, and ASEAN+3 Summit.	
21	Peru	Lima	14–17 November	Yoon attended the APEC summit.	
21	Brazil	Rio de Janeiro	17–19 November	Yoon attended the G20 summit.	

== Multilateral meetings ==
Yoon Suk-yeol attended the following summits as South Korean President.

Group	Year		
Group	2022	2023	2024
UNGA	20–21 September, (United States) New York City	18–22 September, (United States) New York City	27 September,^{[a]} (United States) New York City
ASEM	None	None	None
EAS (ASEAN+3)	11–13 November, (Cambodia) Phnom Penh	5–7 September, (Indonesia) Jakarta	9–11 October, (Laos) Vientiane
ASEAN–Korea	12 November, (Cambodia) Phnom Penh	6 September, (Indonesia) Jakarta	10 October, (Laos) Vientiane
APEC	18–19 November, (Thailand) Bangkok^{[b]}	15–17 November, (United States) San Francisco	15–16 November, (Peru) Lima
G20	13–16 November, (Indonesia) Bali	9–10 September, (India) New Delhi	18–19 November, (Brazil) Rio de Janeiro
NATO	28–30 June,^{[c]} (Spain) Madrid	11–12 July,^{[c]} (Lithuania) Vilnius	9–11 July,^{[c]} (United States) Washington, D.C.
UNCCC	6–22 November, (Egypt) Sharm el-Sheikh	30 November – 13 December, (United Arab Emirates) Dubai	11–22 November, (Azerbaijan) Baku
China–Japan–Korea	None	None	26–27 May, (South Korea) Seoul
Others	None	Coronation of King Charles III and Queen Camilla; 5–6 May, (United Kingdom) London^{[b]}	South Korea–Africa Summit; 4–5 June, Ilsan, Seoul
Others	None	G7; 19–21 May, (Japan) Hiroshima	Global Peace Summit; 15–16 June, (Switzerland) Lucerne
Others	None	Korea–Pacific Islands Summit; 29–30 May (South Korea) Seoul	Global Peace Summit; 15–16 June, (Switzerland) Lucerne
Others	None	JAROKUS; 18 August, (United States) Camp David	Global Peace Summit; 15–16 June, (Switzerland) Lucerne
██ = Future event ██ = Did not attend^aCho Tae-yul attended in the president's place.^bHan Duck-soo attended in the president's place.^cSouth Korea was not a full member.

== See also ==
- List of international trips made by presidents of South Korea
