= List of international presidential trips made by Park Geun-hye =

This is a list of international presidential trips made by Park Geun-hye, the 11th President of South Korea. Park Geun-hye has made 49 presidential trips to 38 countries during her presidency, which began on 25 February 2013 and ended with her removal from office on 10 March 2017.

== Summary of presidential visits ==
The number of visits per country where she travelled are:

- One visit to: Australia, Belgium, Brazil, Brunei, Canada, Chile, Colombia, Czech Republic, Ethiopia, Germany, India, Indonesia, Iran, Italy, Kazakhstan, Kenya, Kuwait, Laos, Malaysia, Mexico, Mongolia, Myanmar, Netherlands, Peru, Philippines, Qatar, Saudi Arabia, Singapore, Switzerland, Turkey, Turkmenistan, Uganda, United Kingdom, Uzbekistan, Vatican City and Vietnam
- Two visits to: Russia and United Arab Emirates
- Three visits to: France
- Four visits to: China
- Five visits to: United States

Map of international trips made by Park Geun-hye as president: One visit Two visits Three visits Four visits 5 visits 6 visits 7 or more visits South Korea

=== 2013 ===
#	Country	Locations	Dates	Details	Image
1	United States	Washington, D.C., New York City, and Los Angeles	5–9 May	She traveled to Washington, D.C., New York City, and Los Angeles. During summit talks at the White House, she and U.S. President Barack Obama adopted a joint declaration for the American-South Korean alliance and discussed ways to further develop the bilateral relations in a future-forward manner. Also, the two leaders discussed ways to promote cooperation in building peace in the Northeast Asian region and strengthen the partnership between Seoul and Washington. The two leaders of South Korea and the United States agreed to adopt a joint statement on comprehensive energy cooperation to build a foundation for a future growth engine, and establish a policy cooperation committee on information and communication technology. In addition, Park urged her U.S. counterpart to expand the annual U.S. visa quota for South Korean professionals in order to promote co-development of both economies.	

== See also ==
- List of international trips made by presidents of South Korea
