= 2023 visit by Yoon Suk Yeol to Ukraine =

2023 visit by South Korean President to Kyiv

- Date: 15 July 2023
- Location: Kyiv, Irpin and Bucha, Ukraine
- Type: Diplomatic visit
- Participants: Yoon Suk Yeol; Volodymyr Zelenskyy
- Outcome: The two countries agreed to jointly pursue the Ukraine Peace Solidarity Initiative.; The two countries agreed to expand cooperation to establish an online and offline education system of Ukraine.; South Korea has agreed to provide $150 million in humanitarian aid for Ukraine.; South Korea has decided to build infrastructure in Ukraine through the $100 million project fund.

On 15 July 2023, President Yoon Suk Yeol visited Ukraine after visiting Lithuania and Poland for the NATO summit. He visited Bucha and Irpin, small cities near the capital city of Kyiv. He laid flowers on the monument.

== Background ==
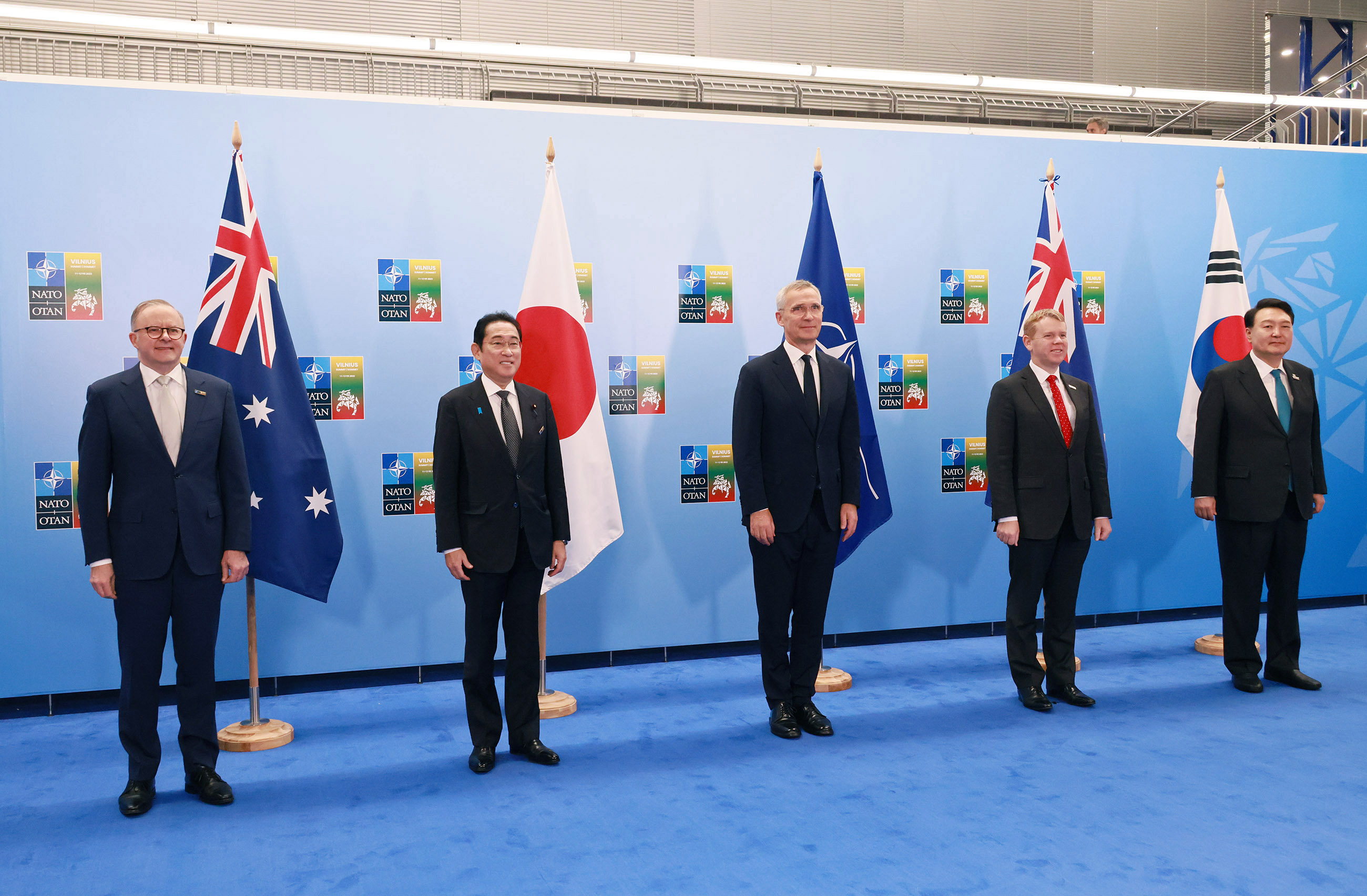
Yoon with leaders of NATO global partners at NATO Vilnius summit

South Korea, a key United States ally in Asia, has actively participated in international sanctions against Russia and provided Ukraine with humanitarian and financial support. However, South Korea, the world's ninth largest arms exporter, was not supplying Ukraine with weapons in accordance with an old policy of not supplying arms to conflict zones.

Invited to the summit amid China's support for Russia and geopolitical concerns in the region, President Yoon Suk Yeol attended the NATO AP4 summit in Lithuania. He then visited Poland, held a summit with President Andrzej Duda, and expressed his solidarity with Ukraine against Russia's invasion.

All of the G7 leaders had already visited Ukraine and had a summit with President Volodymyr Zelenskyy. He decides to visit Ukraine because he values diplomacy as a global pivot state.

== Result of the meeting ==
After the summit, Yoon announced plans to expand aid to Ukraine in a joint press conference with Zelenskyy, but did not mention arms supplies. Zelenskyy thanked to Yoon for his "firm support of Ukraine's sovereignty and territorial integrity" and the "significant political, security, economic and humanitarian aid" it has supplied since the start of Russia's invasion.

=== Assistance to Ukraine ===
Yoon said South Korea will also provide $150 million worth of humanitarian aid this year (2023), up from $100 million last year (2022). He also said South Korea and Zelenskyy agreed to cooperate in efforts to rebuild Ukraine after the war. Seoul and Zelenskyy said they will set up a scholarship fund to expand aid to Ukrainian students.

== International reactions ==
=== United States ===
At a press conference on 17 July 2023, United States State Department Press Secretary Matthew Miller said "We welcome the visit. We welcomed the president's expression of support."
