= Seventeenth East Asia Summit =

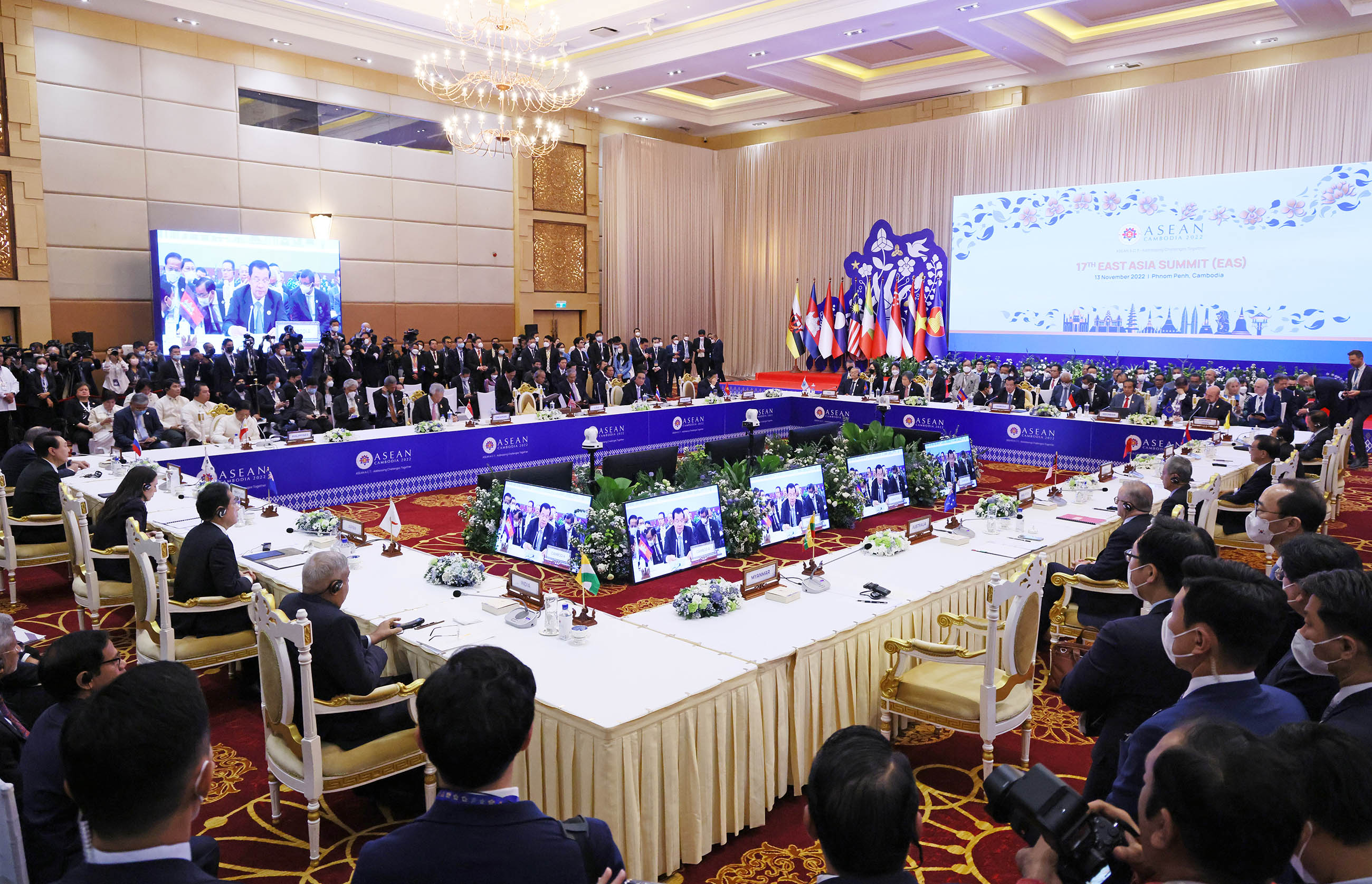
- Host country: Cambodia
- Date: 12–13 November 2022
- Cities: Phnom Penh
- Participants: EAS members
- Follows: Sixteenth East Asia Summit
- Precedes: Eighteenth East Asia Summit

The Seventeenth East Asia Summit was held in Phnom Penh, Cambodia on 12–13 November 2022. The East Asia Summit is an annual meeting of national leaders from the East Asian region and adjoining countries. EAS has evolved as forum for strategic dialogue and cooperation on political, security and economic issues of common regional concern and plays an important role in the regional architecture.

== Attending delegations ==
The heads of state and heads of government of the seventeen countries participated in the summit. The host of the 2022 East Asian Summit is also the Chairperson of ASEAN, the Prime Minister of Cambodia, Hun Sen.

During the summit, US President Joe Biden pledged to work with ASEAN members, saying the bloc is central to the United States strategy in the Indo-Pacific. Russia and the United States failed to agree on language for a joint statement following the summit.

=== Gallery ===
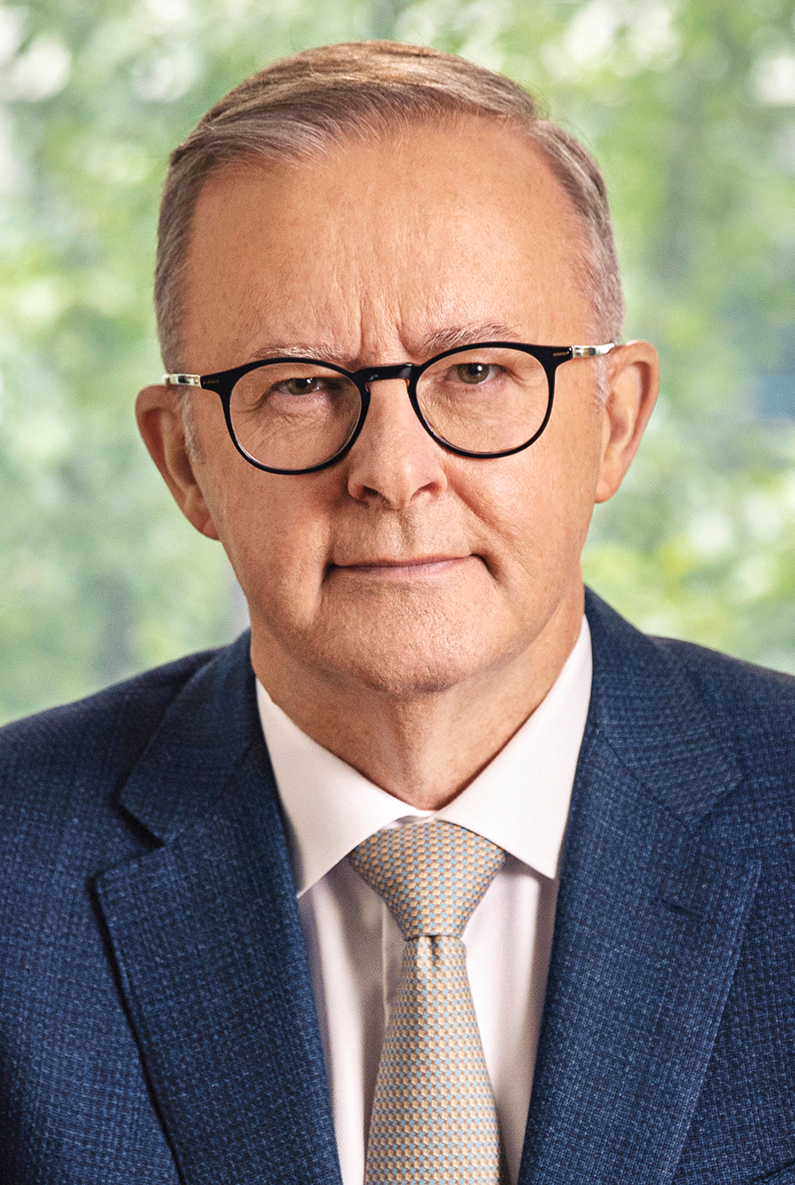
Australia
Prime Minister Anthony Albanese

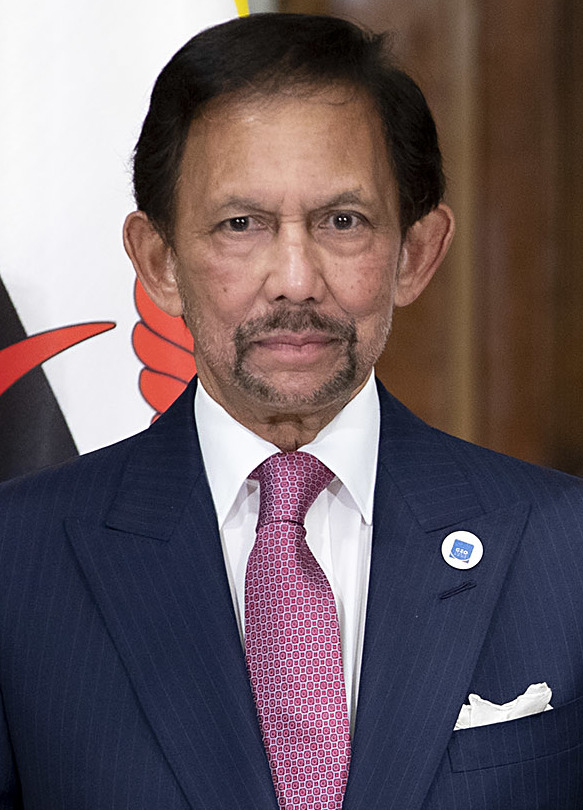
Brunei
Sultan Hassanal Bolkiah

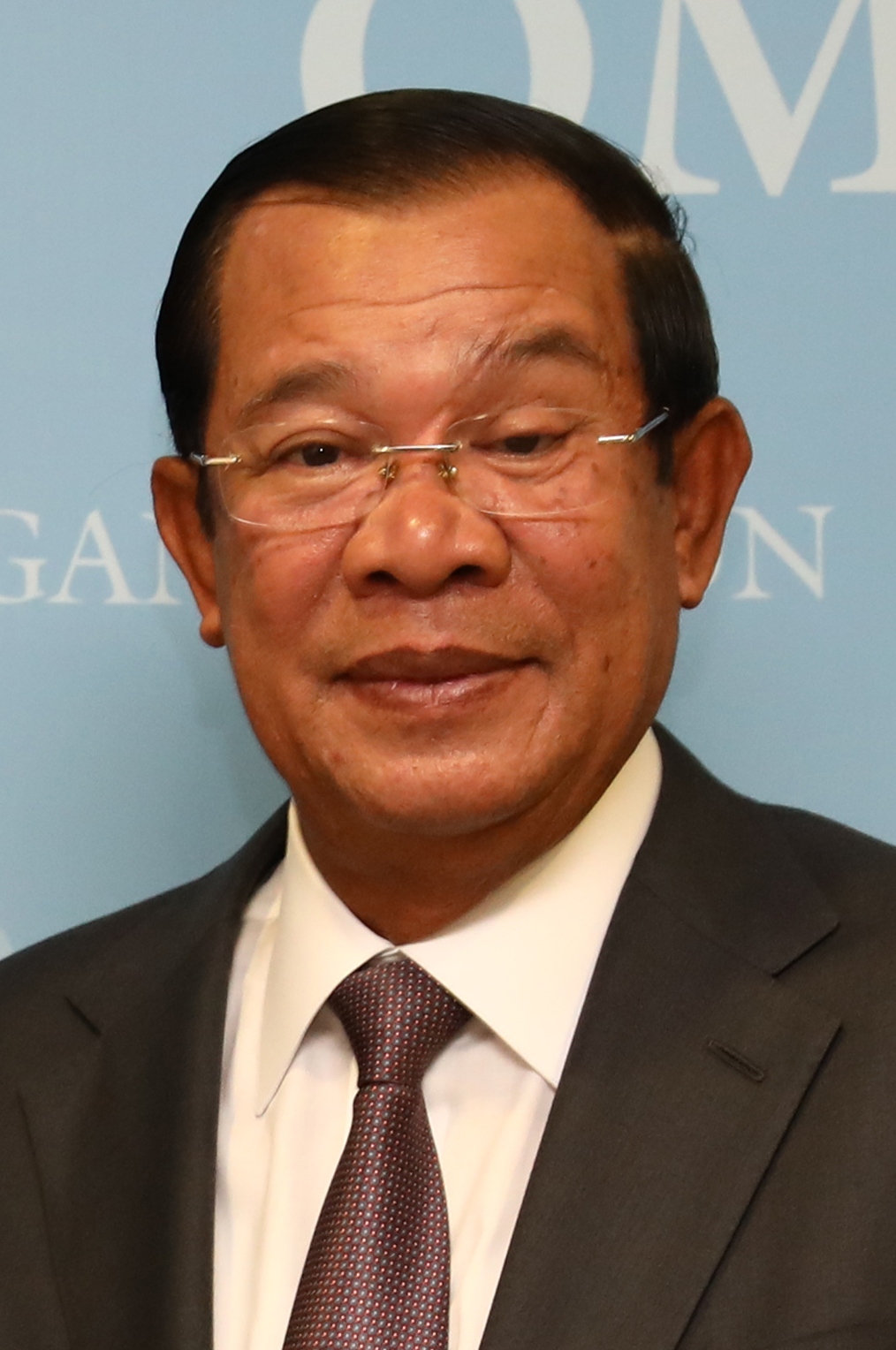
Cambodia
Prime Minister Hun Sen (Chairperson)

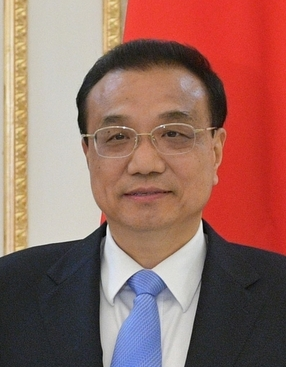
(China) China
Premier Li Keqiang

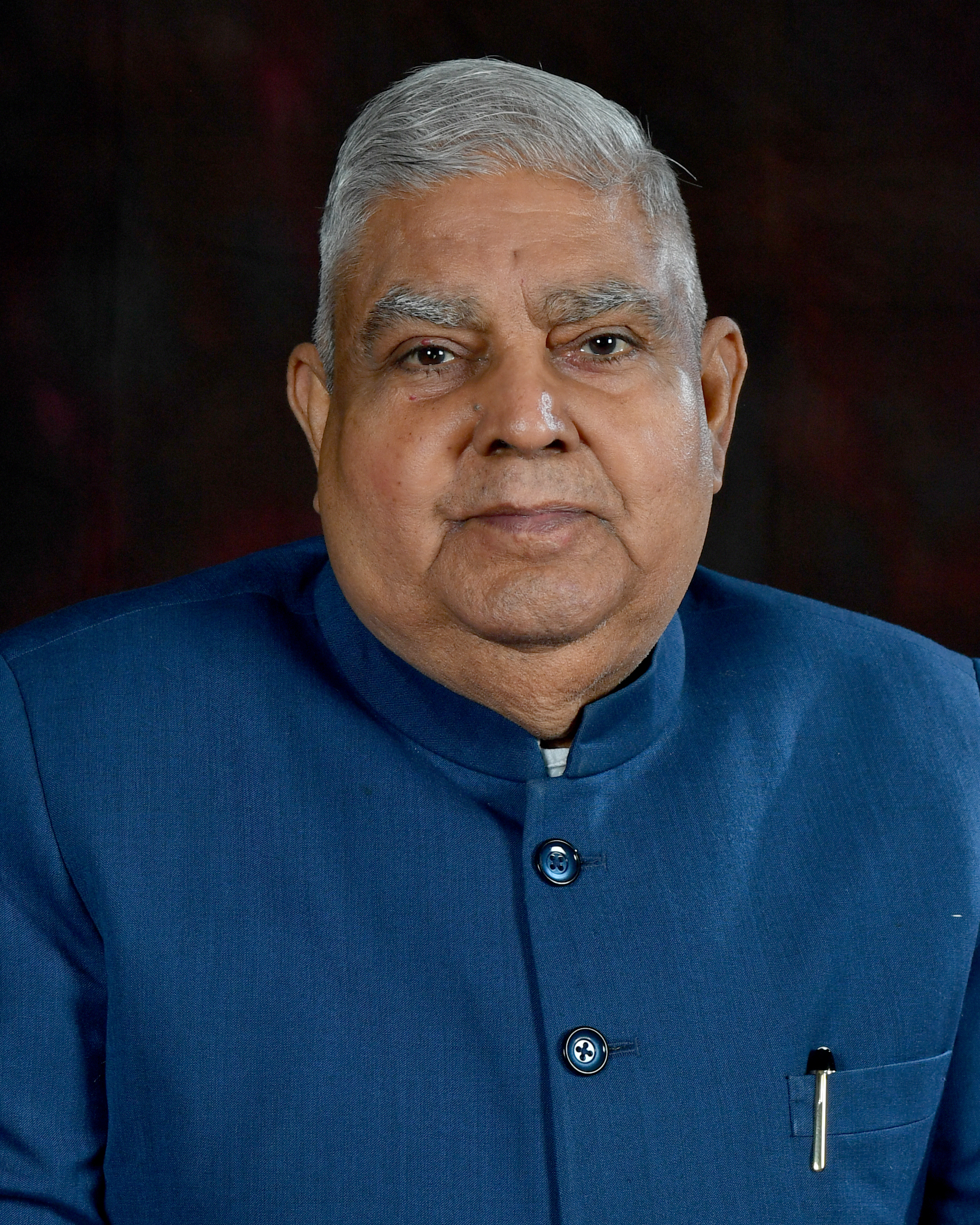
(India) India
Vice President Jagdeep Dhankhar

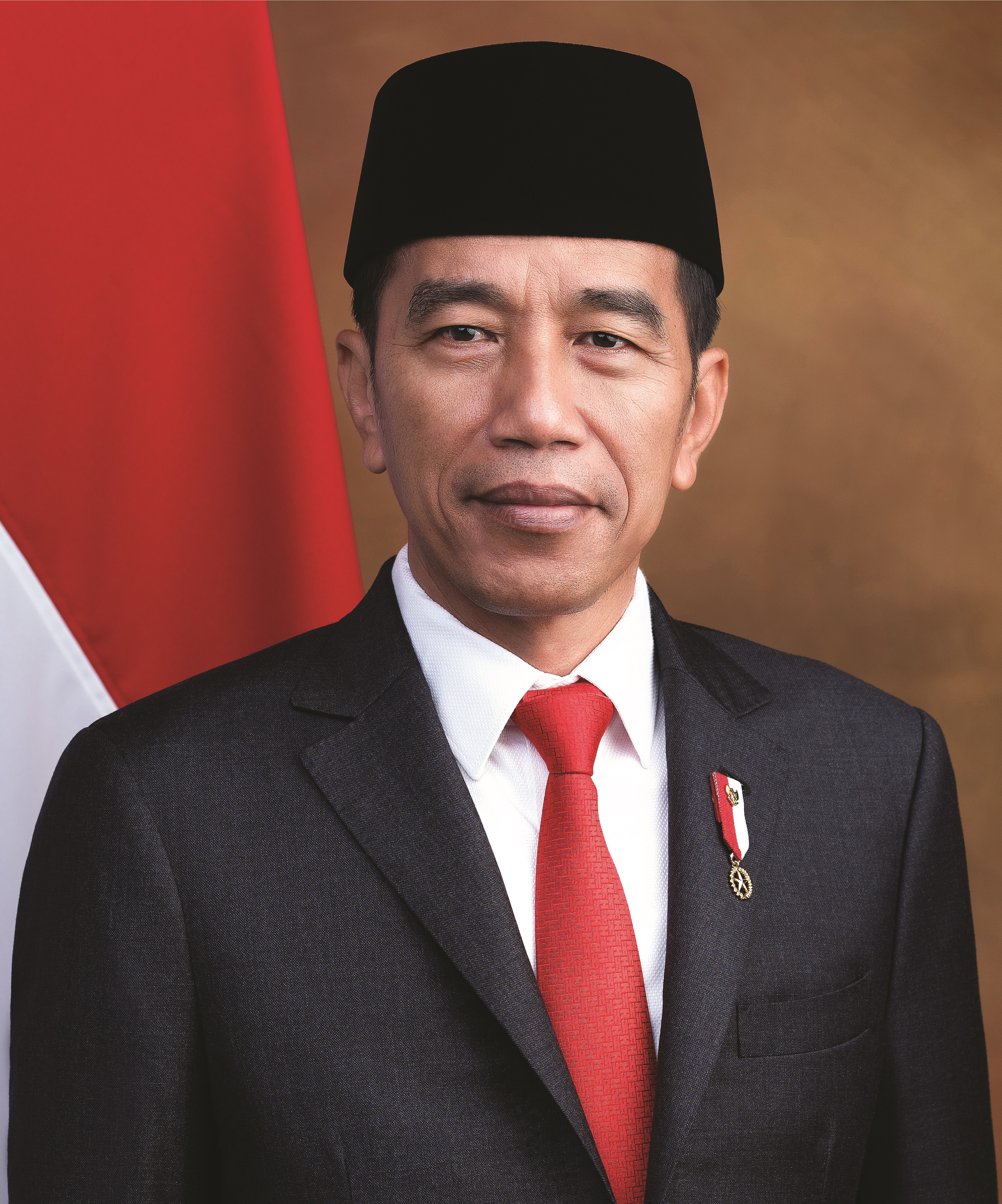
(Indonesia) Indonesia
President Joko Widodo

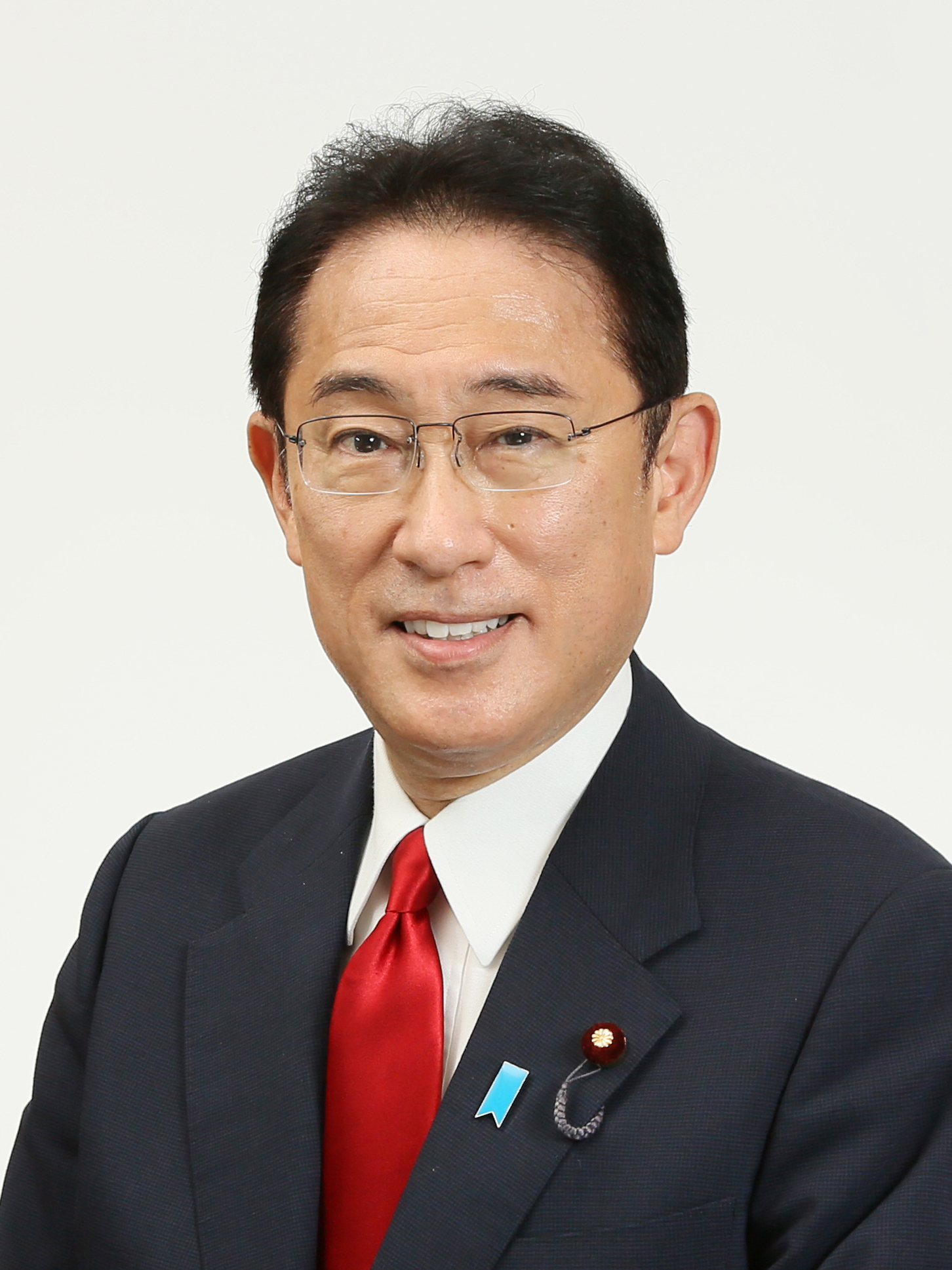
(Japan) Japan
Prime Minister Fumio Kishida

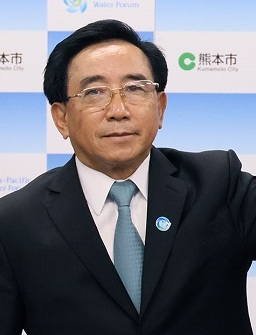
(Laos) Laos
Prime Minister Phankham Viphavanh

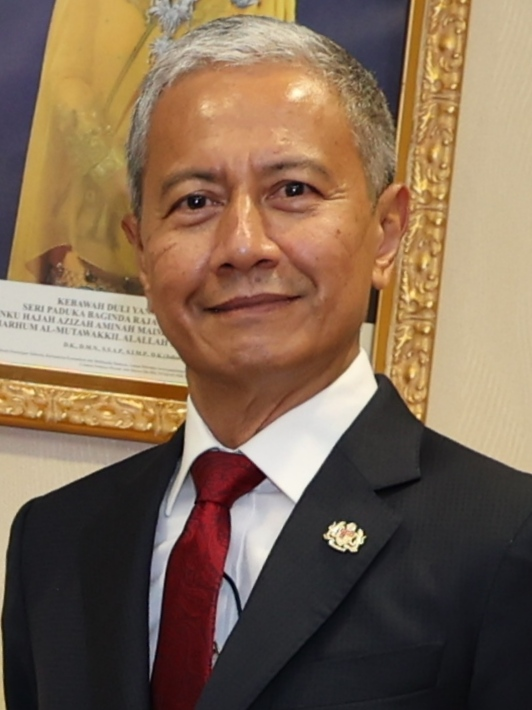
(Malaysia) Malaysia
Speaker of the Dewan Rakyat Azhar Azizan Harun

(Myanmar) Myanmar
Prime Minister Min Aung Hlaing was excluded from participating
Seat reserved

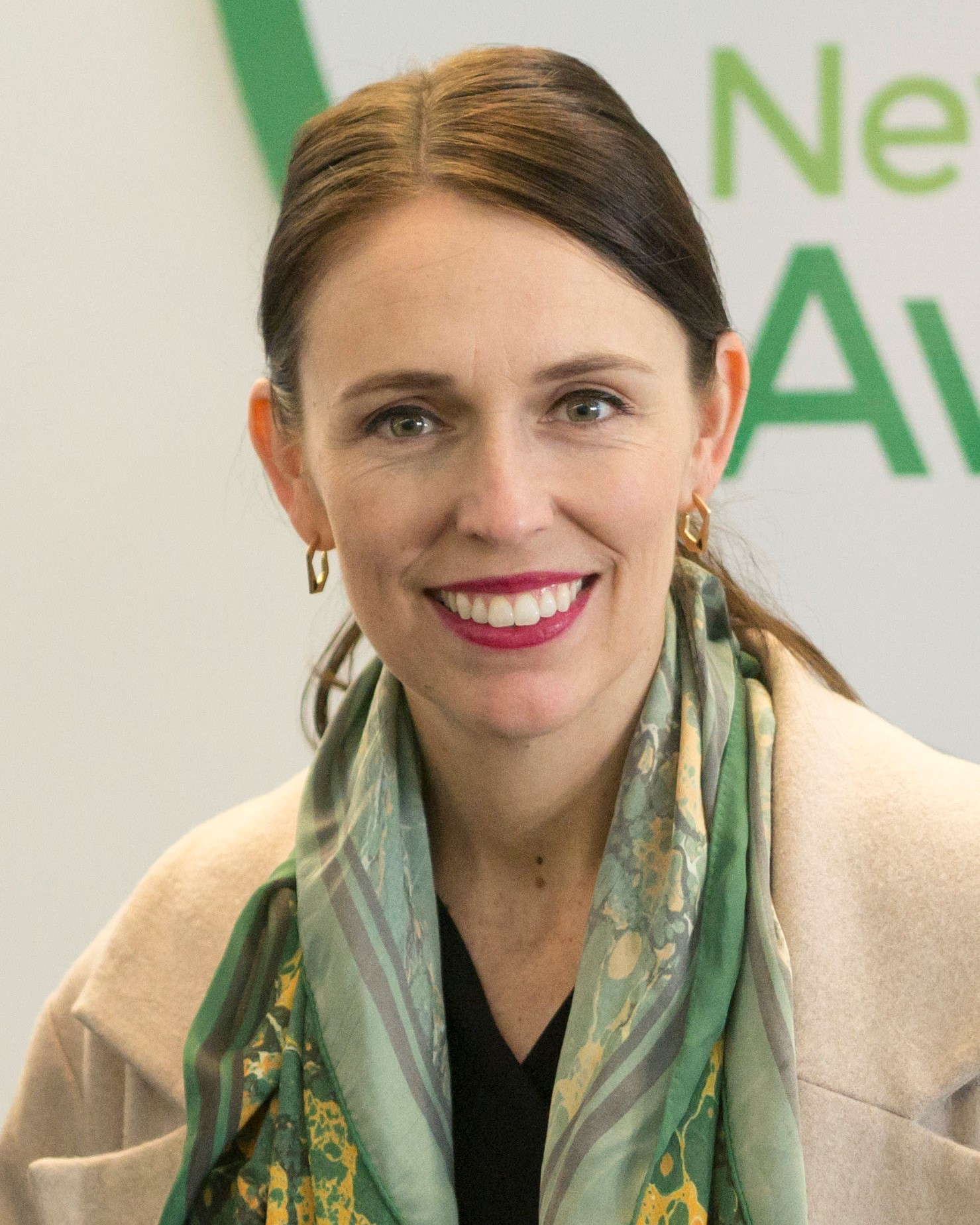
(New Zealand) New Zealand
Prime Minister Jacinda Ardern

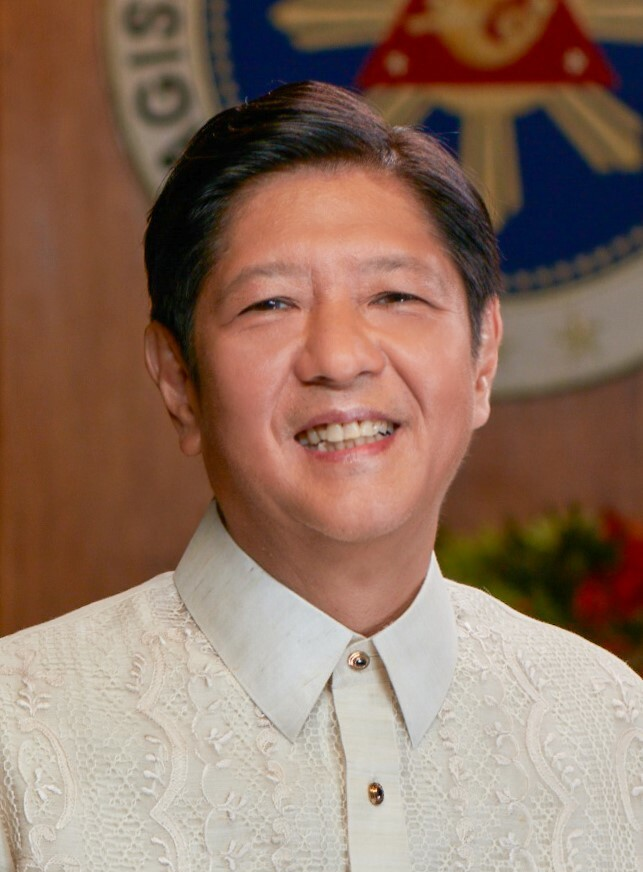
(Philippines) Philippines
President Bongbong Marcos

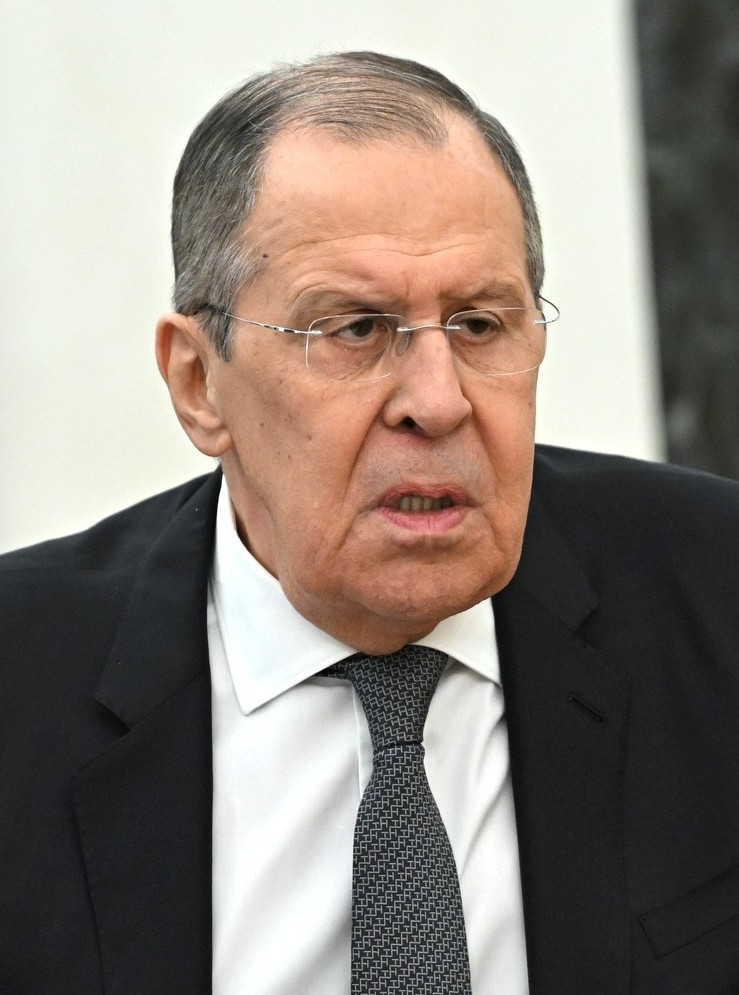
(Russia) Russia
Foreign Minister Sergey Lavrov

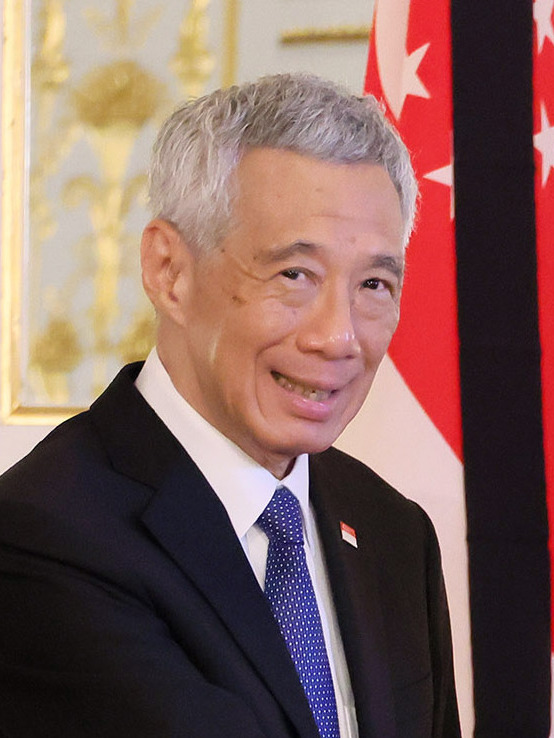
(Singapore) Singapore
Prime Minister Lee Hsien Loong

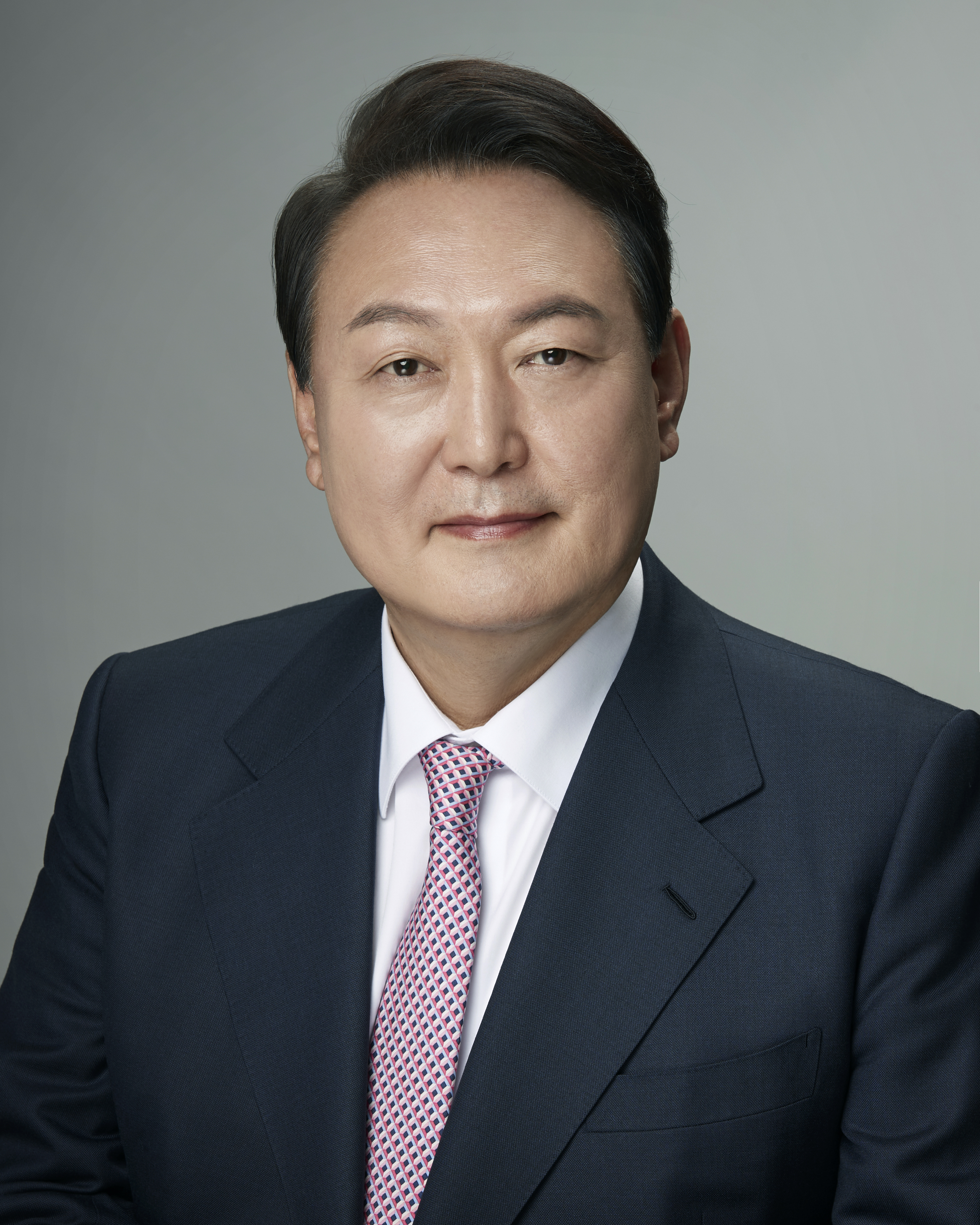
(South Korea) South Korea
President Yoon Suk-yeol

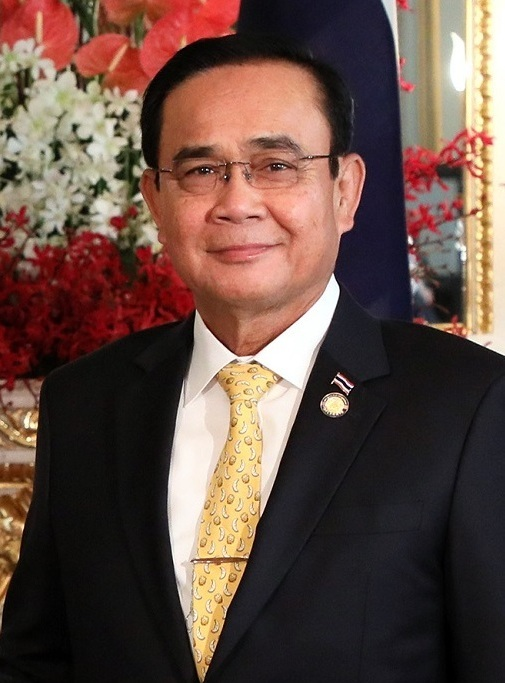
(Thailand) Thailand
Prime Minister Prayuth Chan-ocha

(United States) United States
President Joe Biden

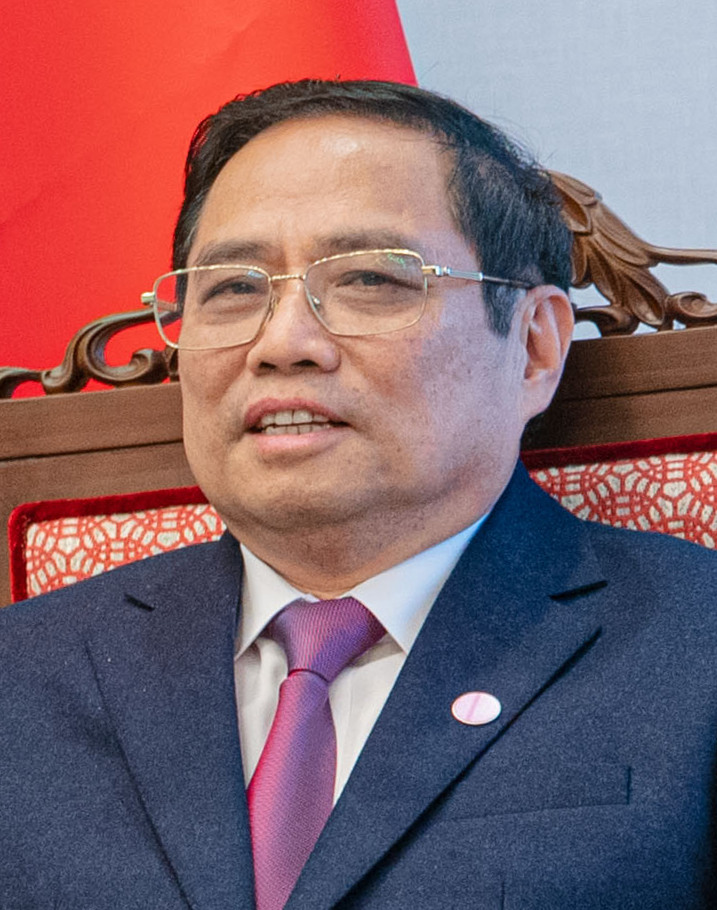
(Vietnam) Vietnam
Prime Minister Phạm Minh Chính

=== Guest invitees ===
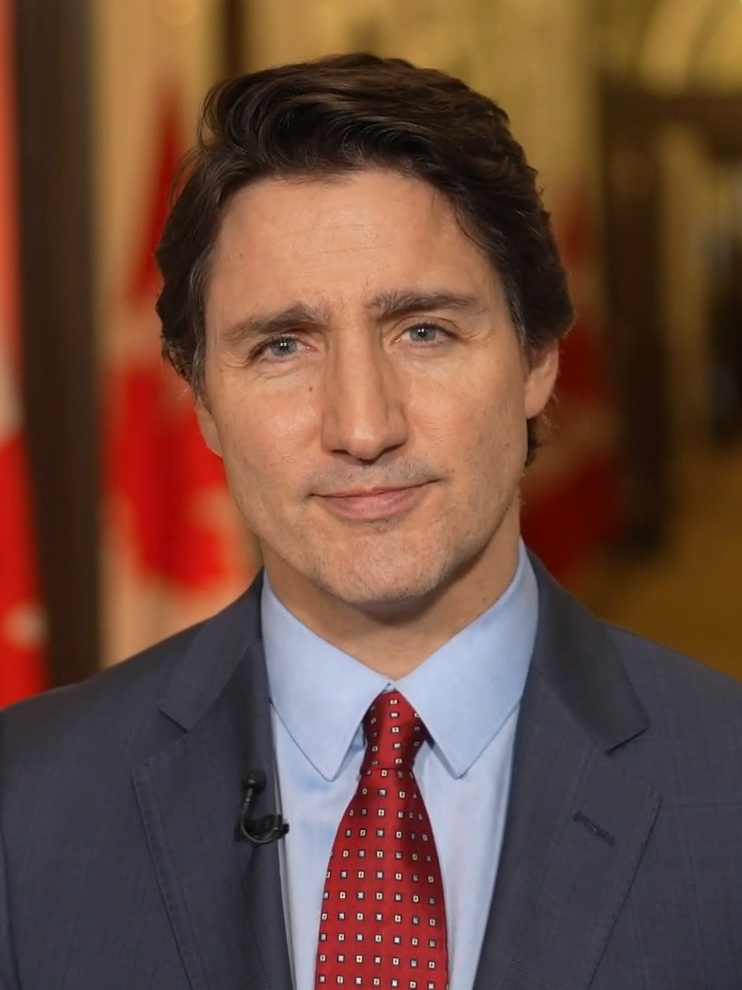
(Canada) Canada
Prime Minister Justin Trudeau

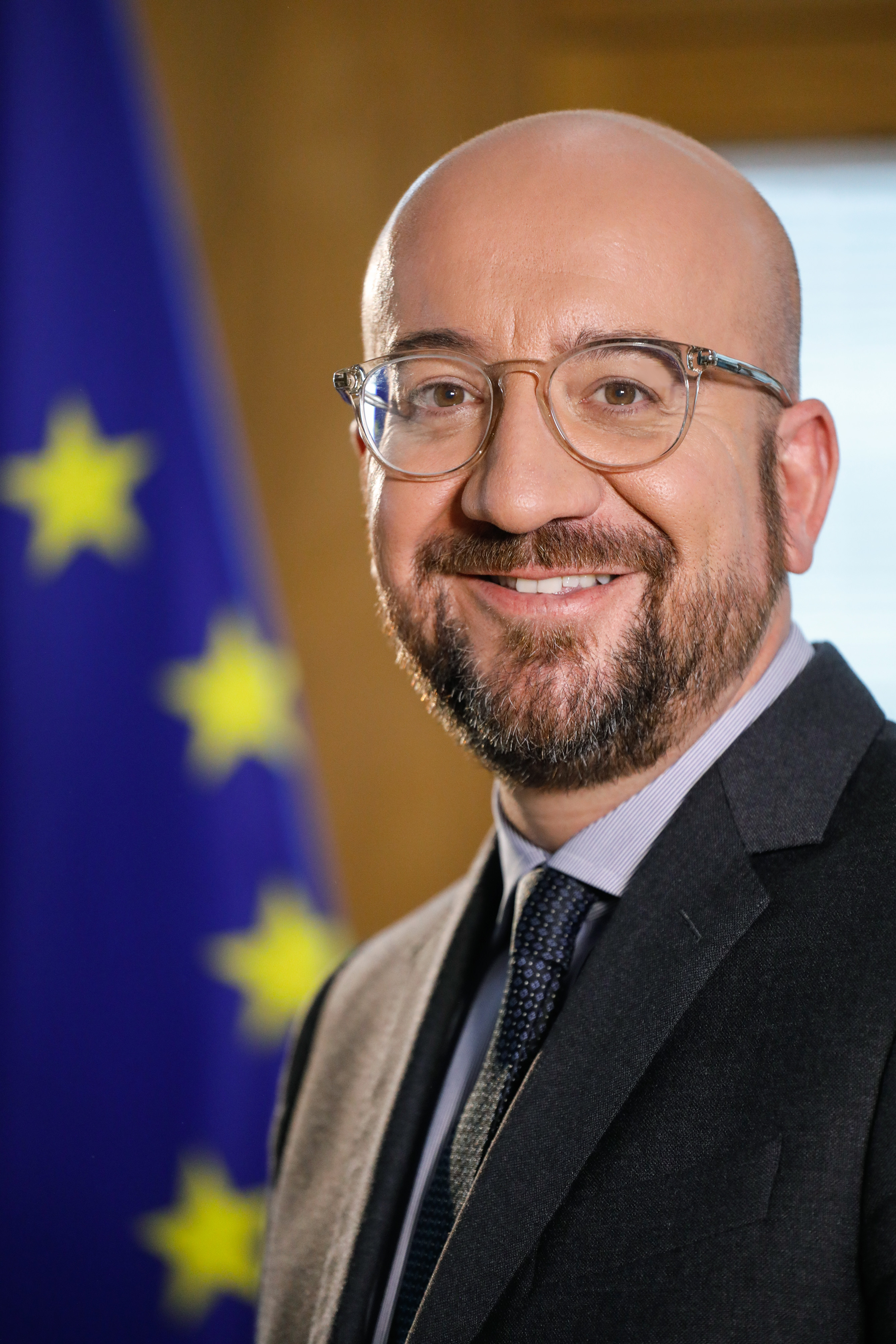
(Europe) European Union
President Charles Michel

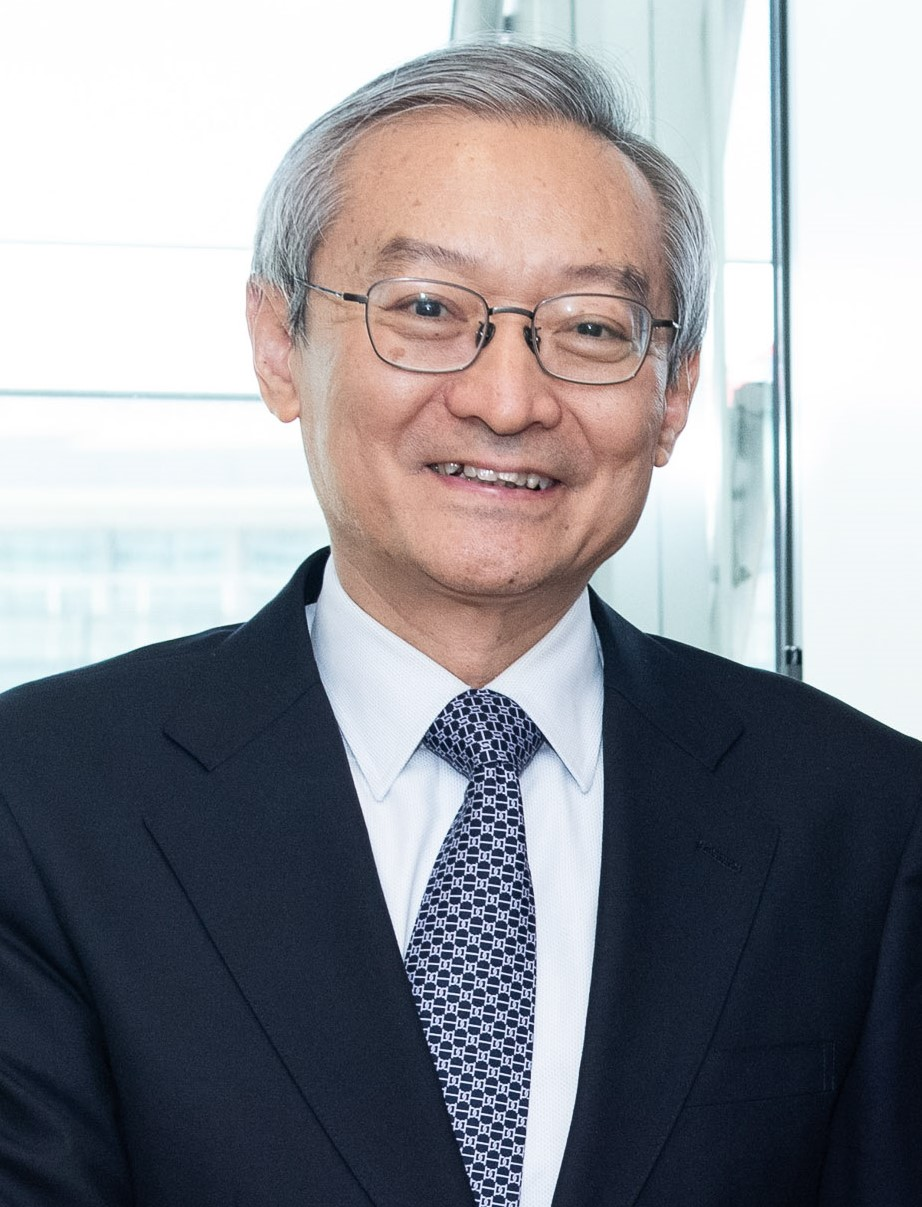
Shanghai Cooperation Organization
Secretary General Zhang Ming
