= Nineteenth East Asia Summit =

2024 conference in Vientiane, Laos

- Host country: Laos
- Date: 10–11 October 2024
- Cities: Vientiane
- Participants: EAS members
- Follows: Eighteenth East Asia Summit
- Precedes: Twentieth East Asia Summit

The Nineteenth East Asia Summit was held in Vientiane, Laos on 10–11 October 2024. The East Asia Summit is an annual meeting of national leaders from the East Asian region and adjoining countries. EAS has evolved as forum for strategic dialogue and cooperation on political, security and economic issues of common regional concern and plays an important role in the regional architecture.

== Attending delegations ==
The heads of state and heads of government of the seventeen countries participated in the summit. The host of the 2024 East Asian Summit is also the chairperson of ASEAN, the Prime Minister of Laos, Sonexay Siphandone.

=== Gallery ===
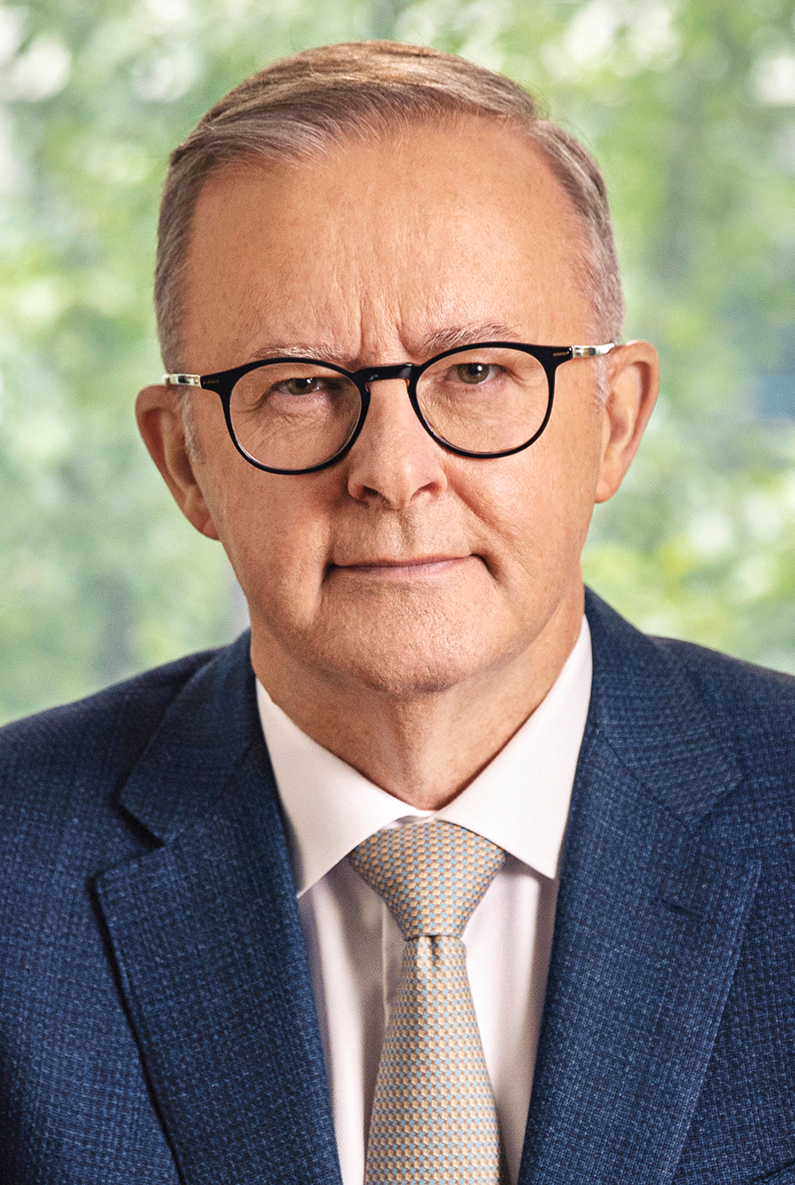
Australia
Prime Minister Anthony Albanese

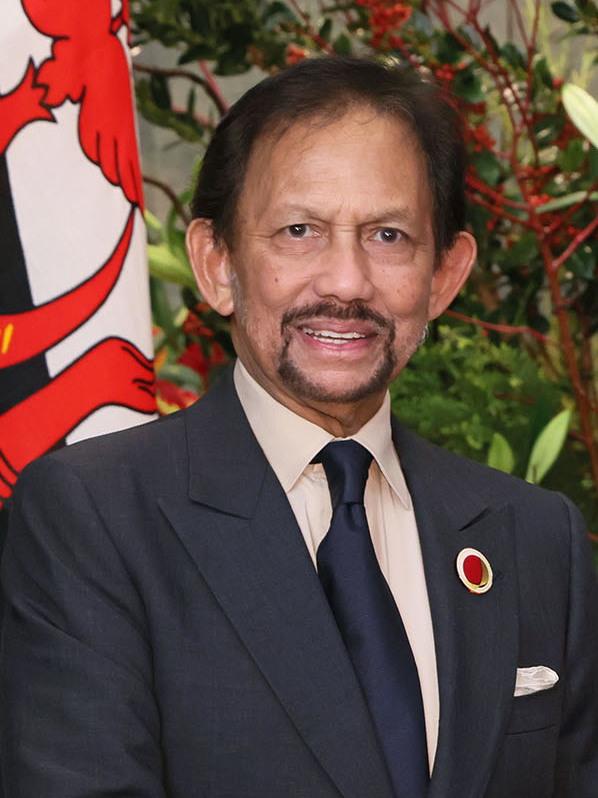
Brunei
Sultan Hassanal Bolkiah

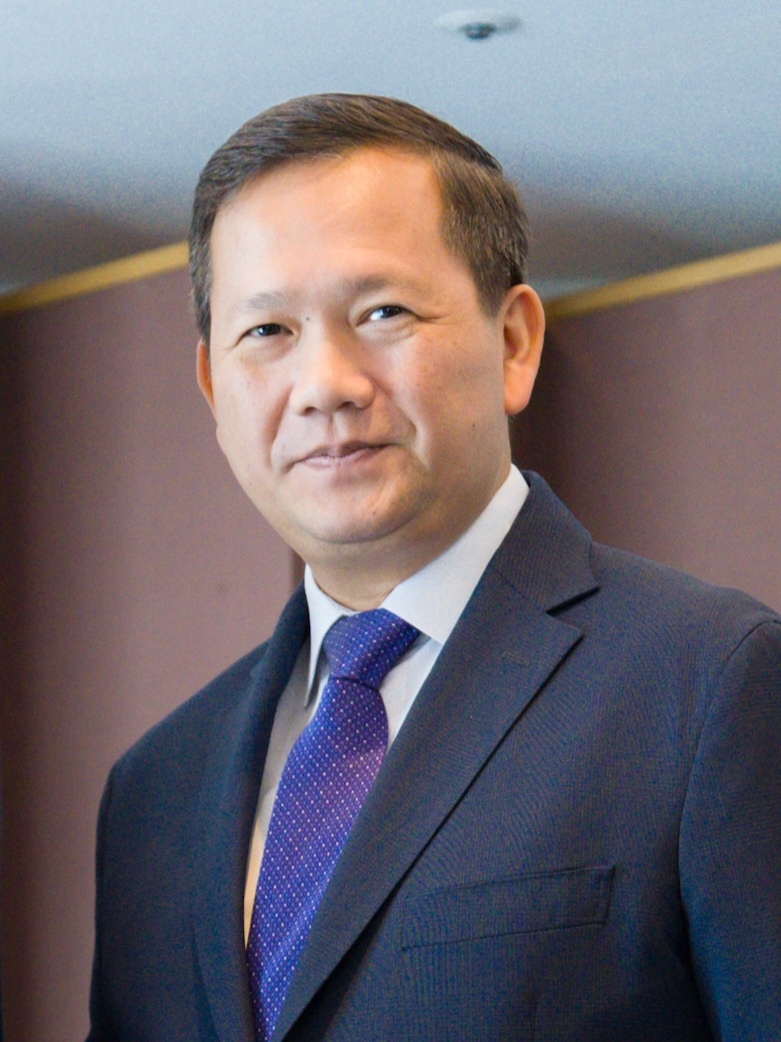
Cambodia
Prime Minister Hun Manet

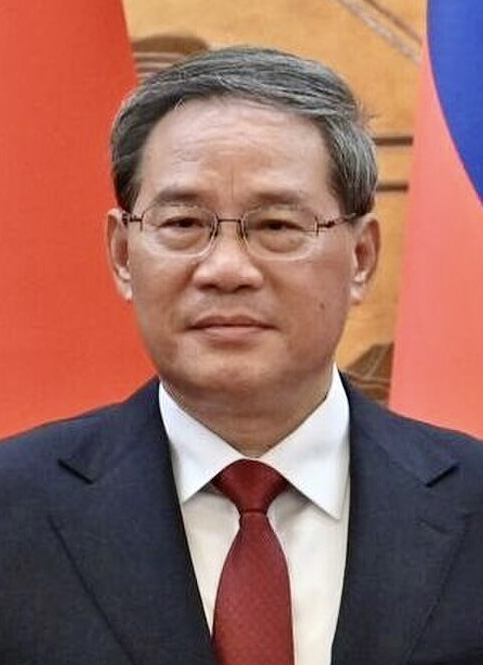
(China) China
Premier Li Qiang

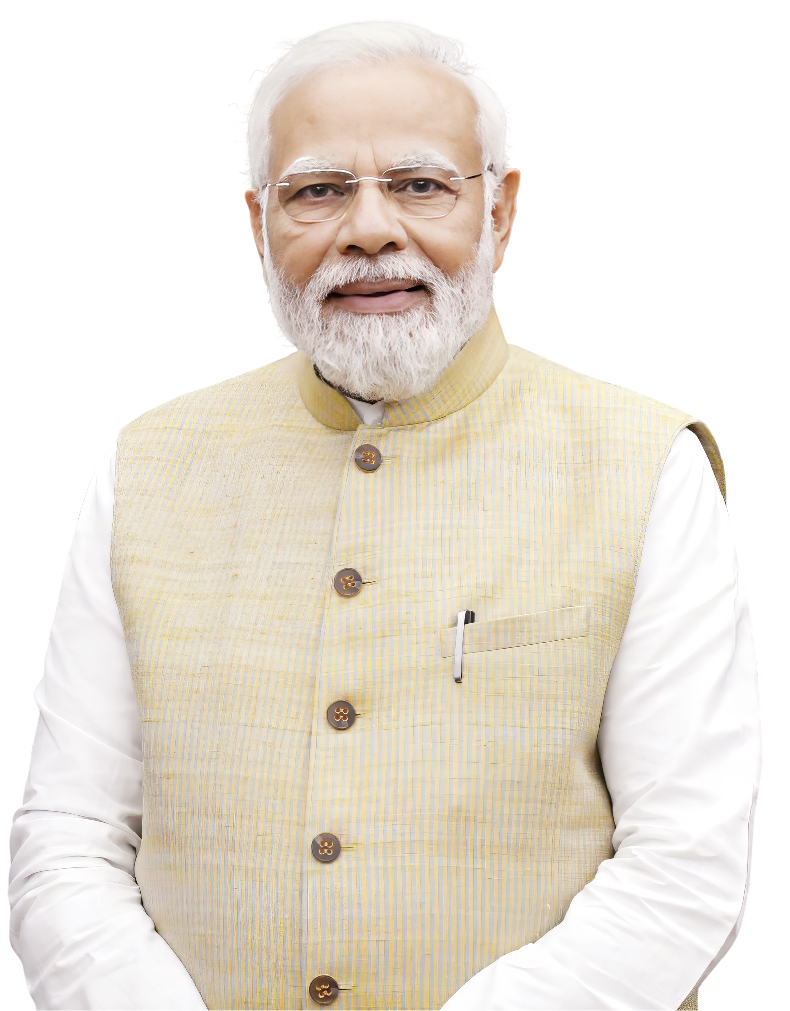
(India) India
Prime Minister Narendra Modi

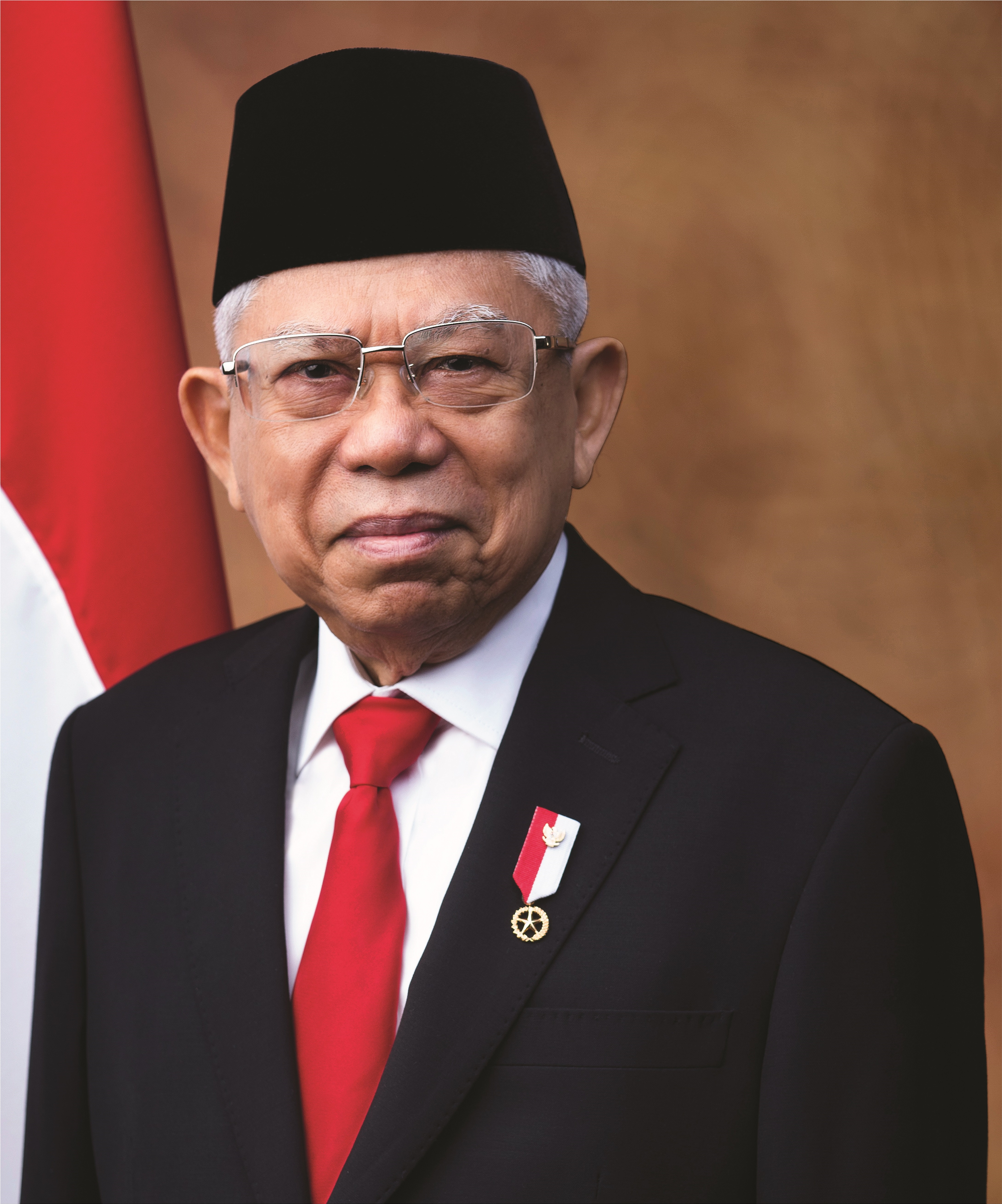
(Indonesia) Indonesia
Vice President Ma'ruf Amin

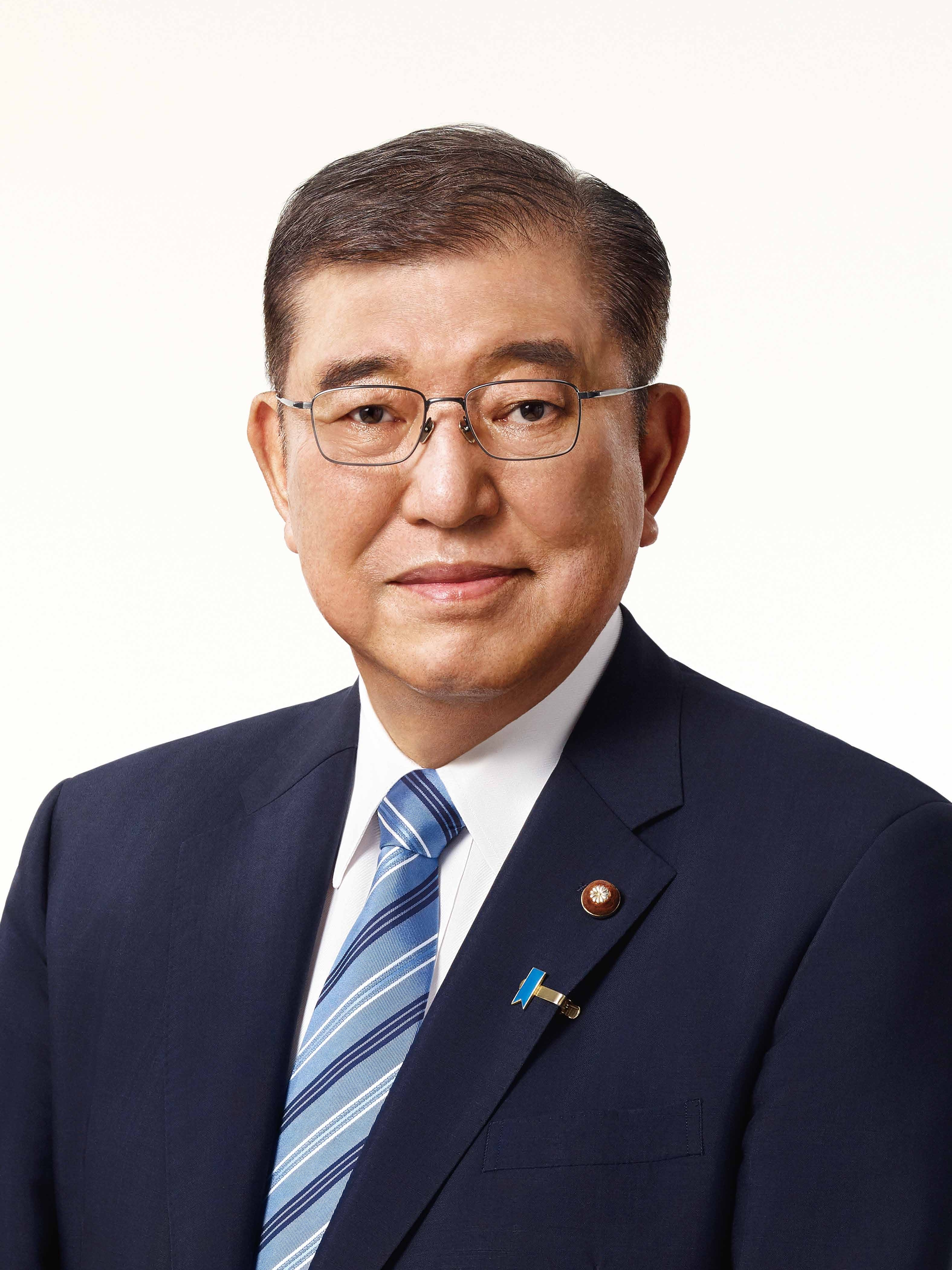
(Japan) Japan
Prime Minister Shigeru Ishiba

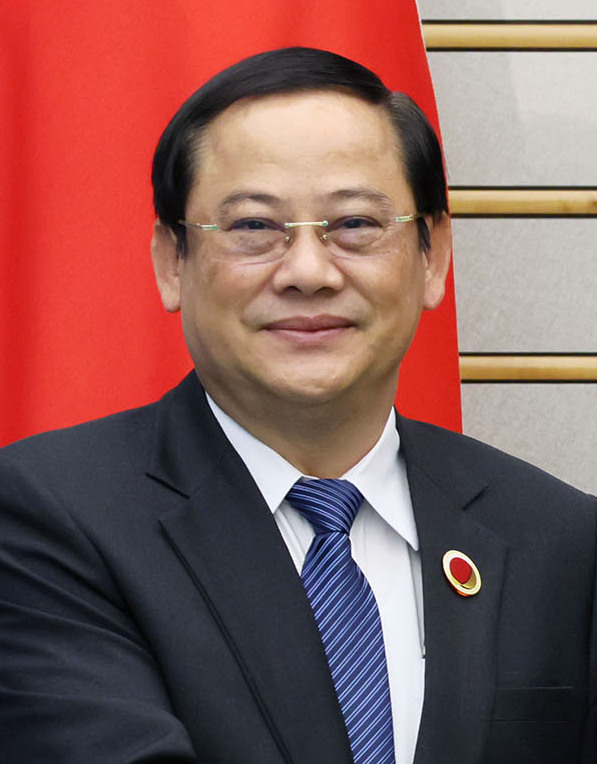
(Laos) Laos
Prime Minister Sonexay Siphandone (chairperson)

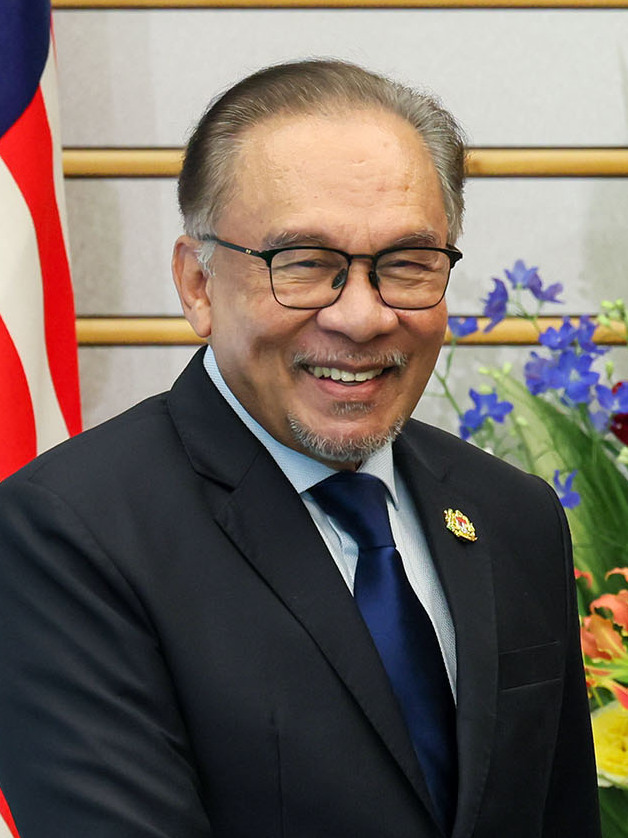
(Malaysia) Malaysia
Prime Minister Anwar Ibrahim

(Myanmar) Myanmar
Permanent Secretary Aung Kyaw Moe

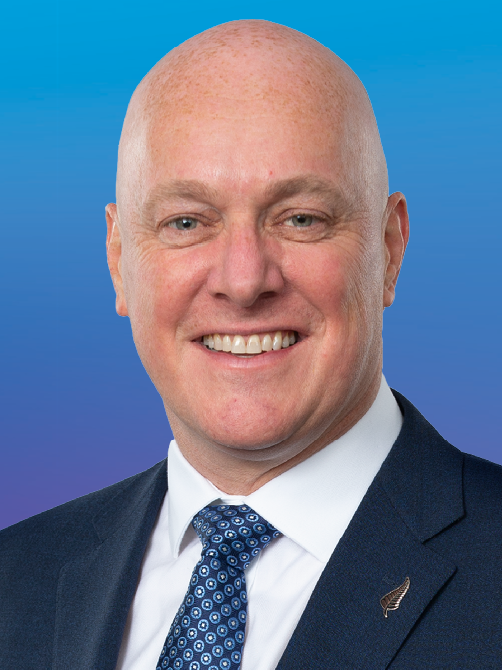
(New Zealand) New Zealand
Prime Minister Christopher Luxon

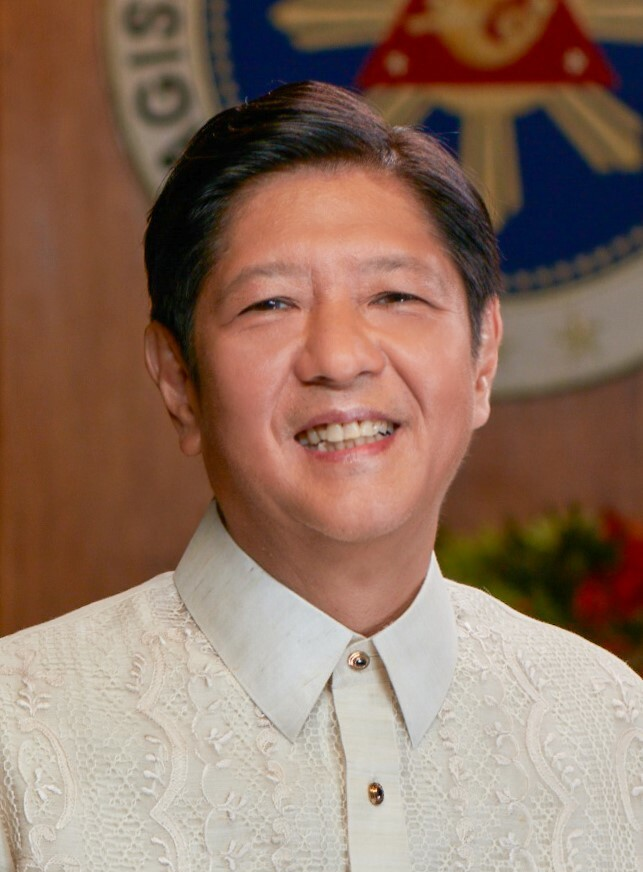
(Philippines) Philippines
President Bongbong Marcos

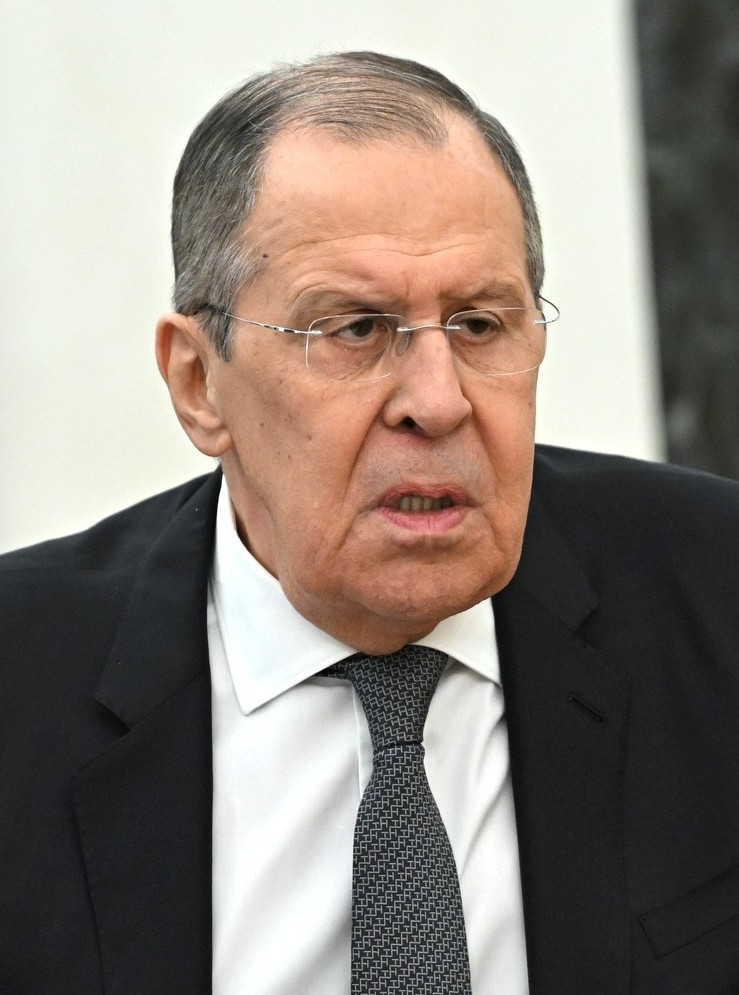
(Russia) Russia
Foreign Minister Sergey Lavrov

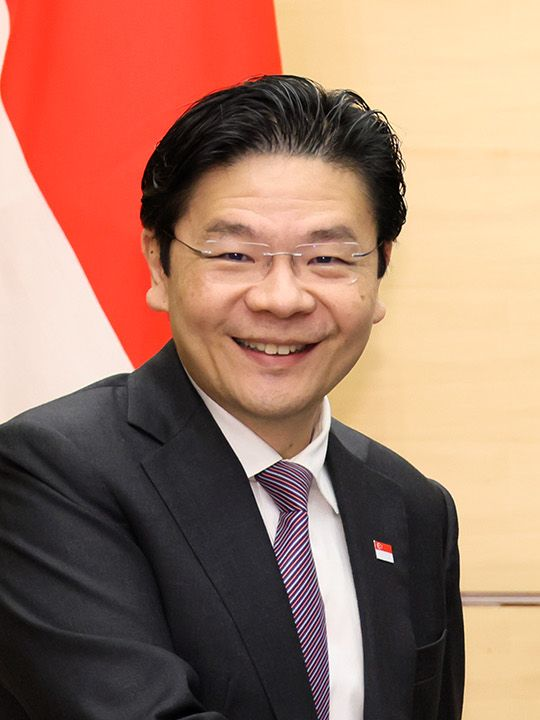
(Singapore) Singapore
Prime Minister Lawrence Wong

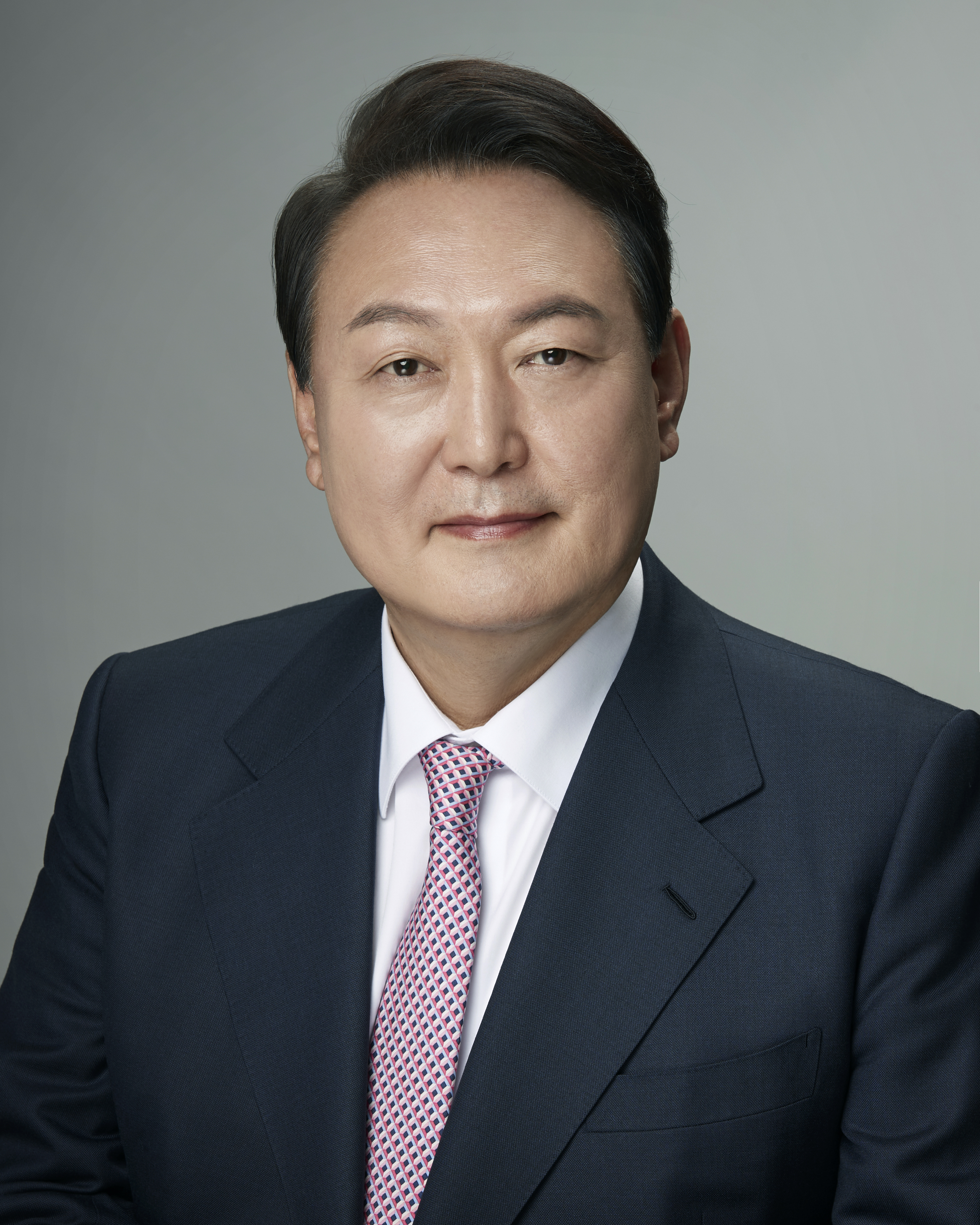
(South Korea) South Korea
President Yoon Suk-yeol

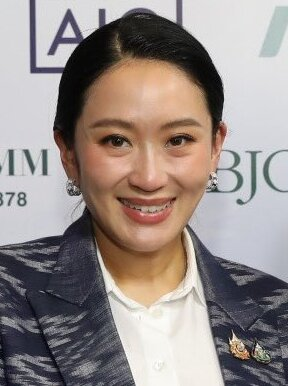
(Thailand) Thailand
Prime Minister Paetongtarn Shinawatra

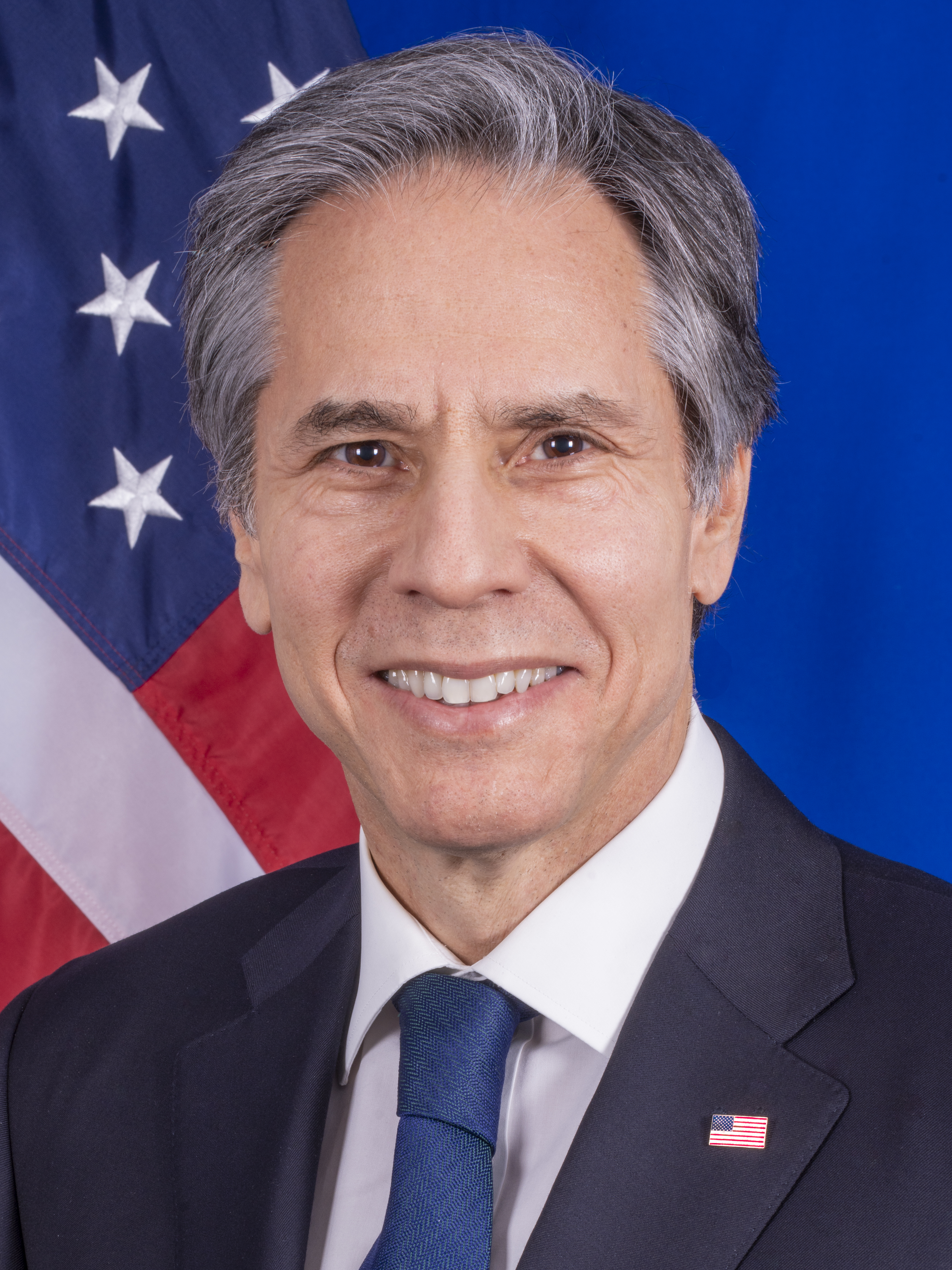
(United States) United States
Secretary of State Antony Blinken

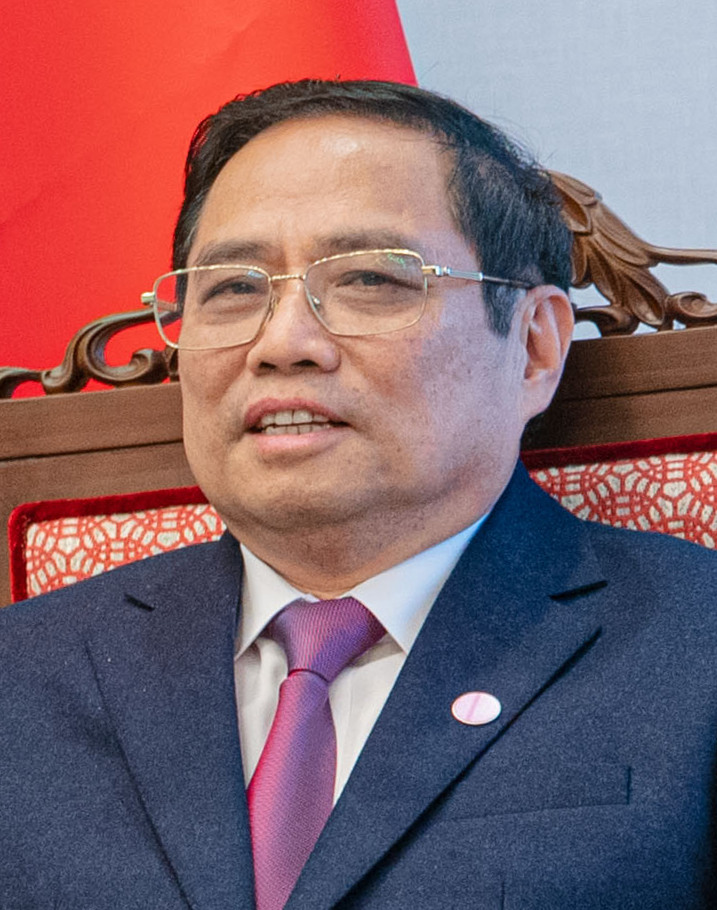
(Vietnam) Vietnam
Prime Minister Phạm Minh Chính

=== Guest invitees ===
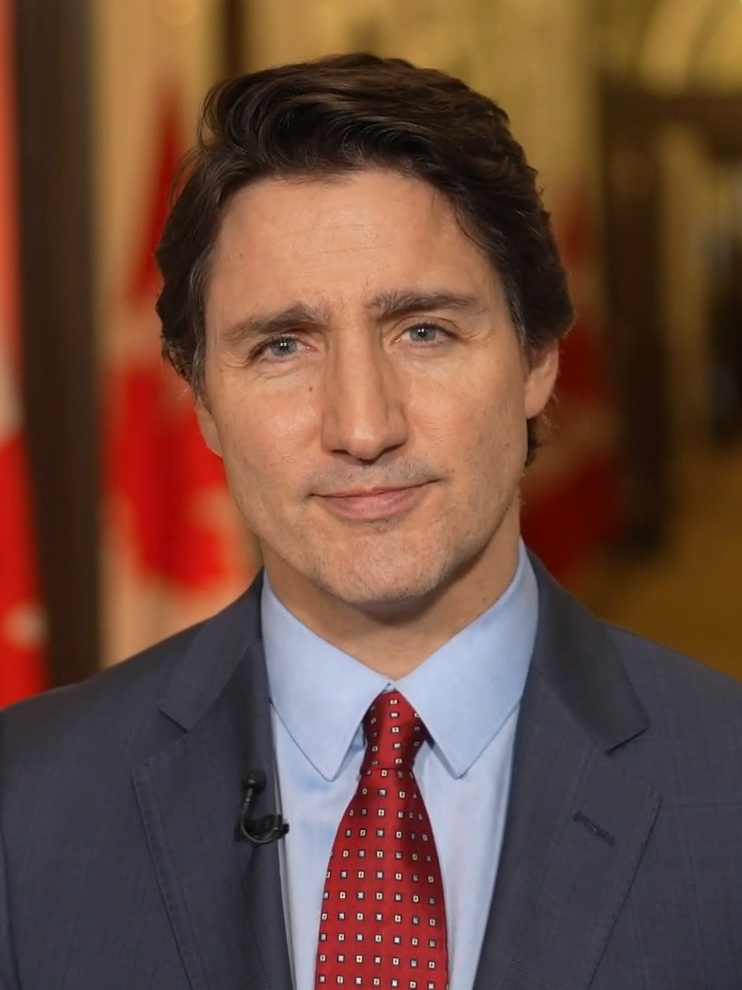
(Canada) Canada
Prime Minister Justin Trudeau

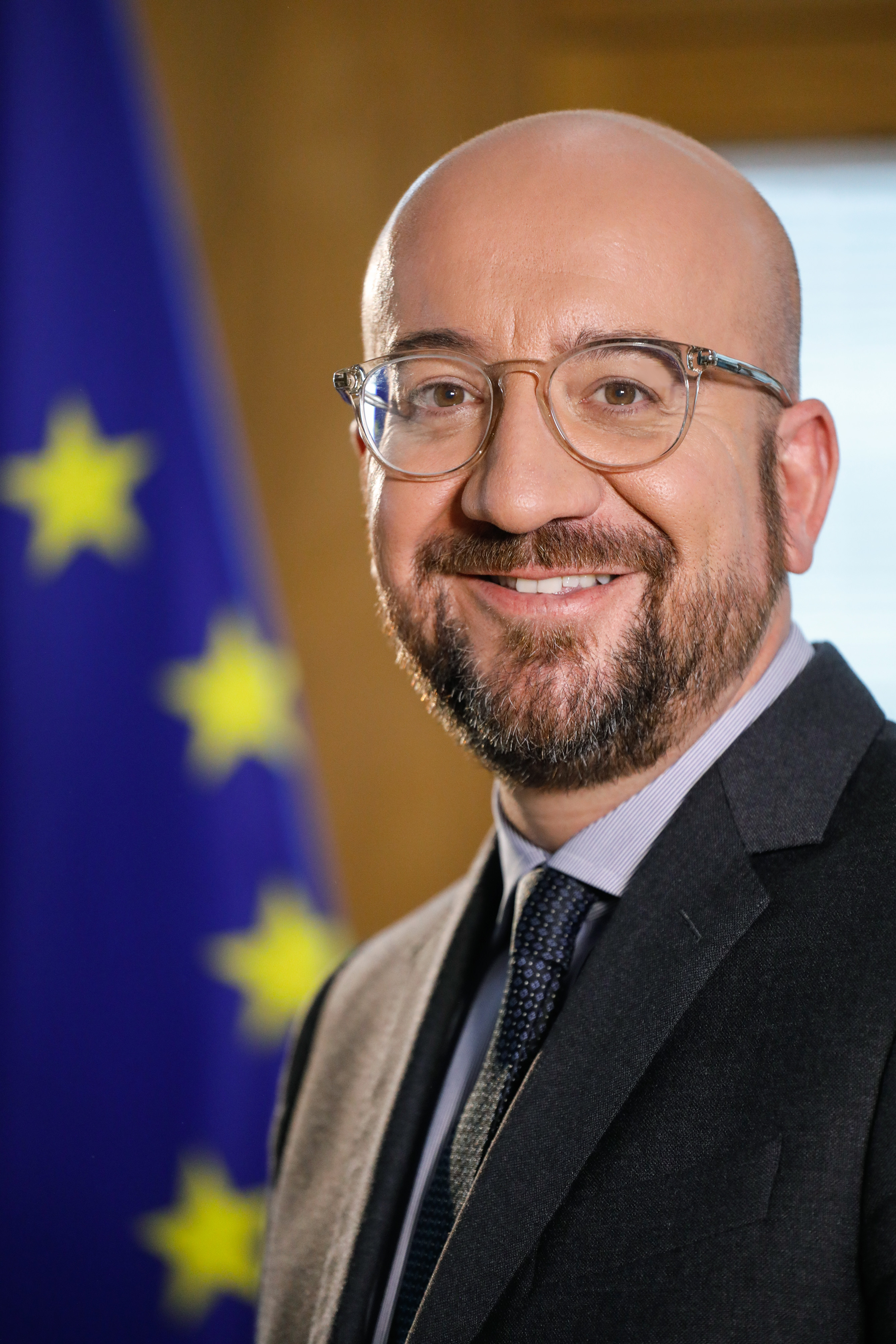
(Europe) European Union
President Charles Michel

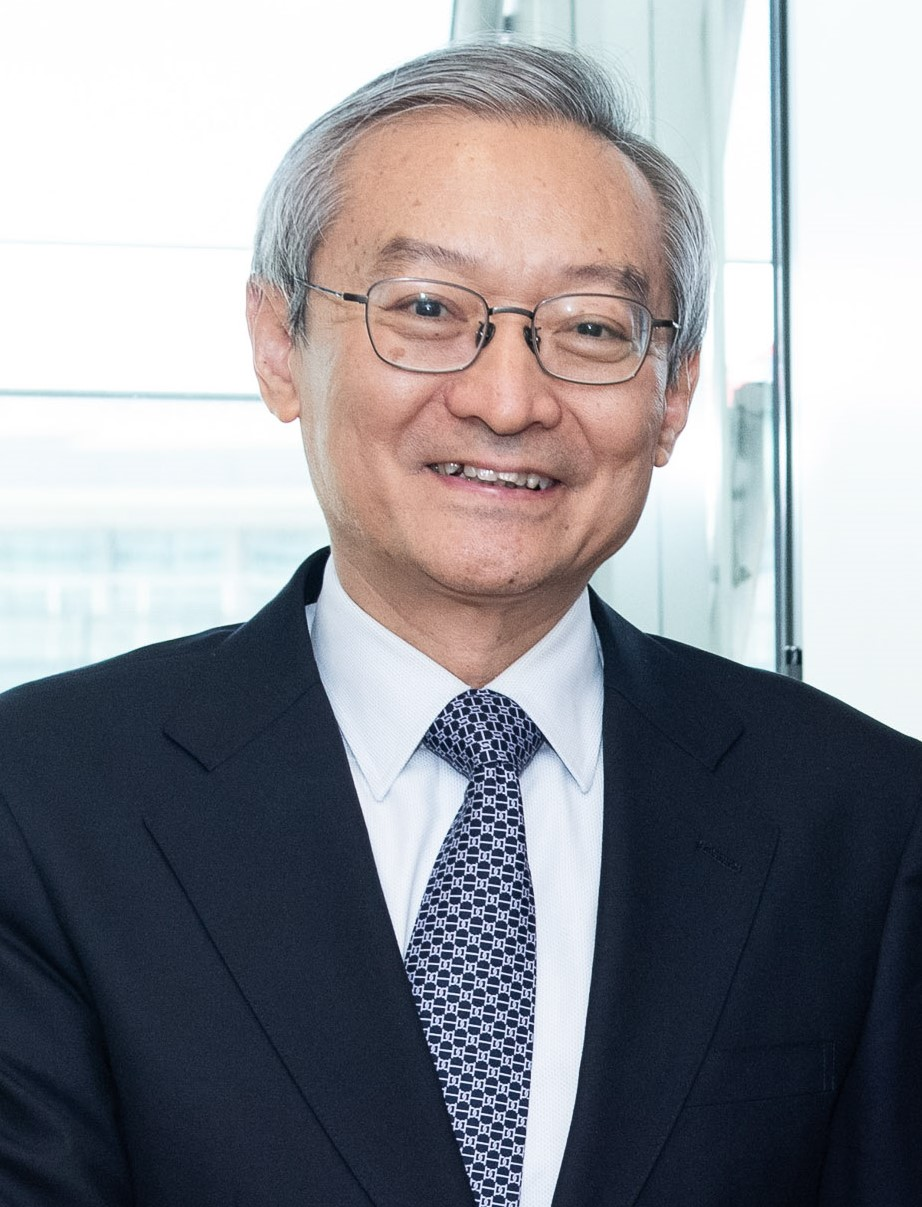
Shanghai Cooperation Organization
Secretary General Zhang Ming

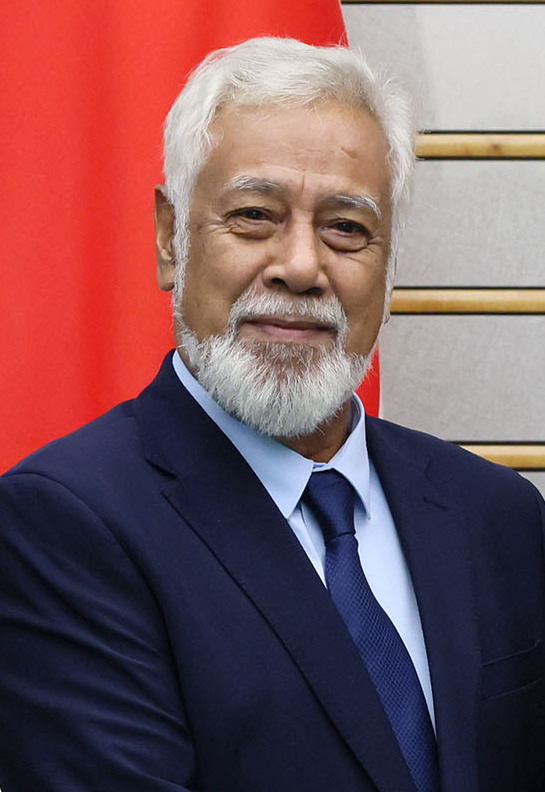
(Timor-Leste) Timor-Leste
Prime Minister Xanana Gusmão
