= List of international trips made by presidents of South Korea =

Map of countries by the number of visits made by a president of South Korea, as of October 2025.: South Korea; 30 or more visits; 20–29 visits; 15–19 visits; 10–14 visits; 5–9 visits; 2–4 visits; 1 visit; No known visits

Altogether, 12 presidents of South Korea have traveled to 73 countries or territories while in office.

== Lee Myung-bak (2008–2013) ==
Countries visited by Lee Myung-bak during his presidency

Lee Myung-bak has made presidential trips to 42 states internationally since his inauguration on 25 February 2008.

== Park Geun-hye (2013–2017) ==
Countries visited by Park Geun-hye during her presidency

Park Geun-hye has made 49 presidential trips to 38 states internationally since her inauguration on 25 February 2013.

== Moon Jae-in (2017–2022) ==
Countries visited by Moon Jae-in during his presidency

Moon Jae-in has made 32 presidential trips to 40 states internationally since his inauguration on 10 May 2017.

== Yoon Suk Yeol (2022–2025) ==
Countries visited by Yoon Suk Yeol during his presidency

Yoon Suk Yeol has made 21 presidential trips to 27 states internationally since his inauguration on 10 May 2022.

== Lee Jae Myung (2025–present) ==
Countries visited by Lee Jae Myung during his presidency

== Table of destinations ==
Region	Country or territory	NV	President and year of visit (Note: column sorts by year of first visit, not by president's name.)
Northeast Asia	China	18	Kim Young-sam 1994 • Kim Dae-jung 1998, 2001 • Roh Moo-hyun 2003, 2006 • Lee Myung-bak 2008(3), 2009, 2010, 2012 • Park Geun-hye 2013, 2014, 2015, 2016 • Moon Jae-in 2017, 2019 • Lee Jae Myung 2026
Northeast Asia	Japan	25	Syngman Rhee 1948, 1953 • Chun Doo-hwan 1984 • Roh Tae-woo 1990 • Kim Young-sam 1994, 1995, 1997 • Kim Dae-jung 1998, 2000, 2002 • Roh Moo-hyun 2003, 2004 • Lee Myung-bak 2008(3), 2009, 2010, 2011, 2012 • Moon Jae-in 2018, 2019 • Yoon Suk Yeol 2023(2) • Lee Jae Myung 2025, 2026
Northeast Asia	Mongolia	5	Kim Dae-jung 1999 • Roh Moo-hyun 2006 • Lee Myung-bak 2011 • Park Geun-hye 2016 • Lee Jae Myung 2026
Northeast Asia	North Korea	5	Kim Dae-jung 2000 • Roh Moo-hyun 2007 • Moon Jae-in 2018(3)
Northeast Asia	Taiwan	2	Syngman Rhee 1953 • Park Chung Hee 1966
Southeast Asia	Brunei	4	Roh Tae-woo 1988 • Kim Dae-jung 2000 • Park Geun-hye 2013 • Moon Jae-in 2019
Southeast Asia	Cambodia	5	Roh Moo-hyun 2006 • Lee Myung-bak 2009, 2012 • Moon Jae-in 2019 • Yoon Suk Yeol 2022
Southeast Asia	Indonesia	14	Chun Doo-hwan 1981 • Roh Tae-woo 1988 • Kim Young-sam 1994 • Kim Dae-jung 2000 • Roh Moo-hyun 2003, 2006 • Lee Myung-bak 2009, 2010, 2011, 2012 • Park Geun-hye 2013 • Moon Jae-in 2017 • Yoon Suk Yeol 2022, 2023
Southeast Asia	Laos	4	Roh Moo-hyun 2004 • Park Geun-hye 2016 • Moon Jae-in 2019 • Yoon Suk Yeol 2024
Southeast Asia	Malaysia	10	Park Chung Hee 1966 • Chun Doo-hwan 1981 • Roh Tae-woo 1988 • Kim Young-sam 1996 • Kim Dae-jung 1998 • Roh Moo-hyun 2005 • Lee Myung-bak 2010 • Park Geun-hye 2015 • Moon Jae-in 2019 • Lee Jae Myung 2025
Southeast Asia	Myanmar	4	Chun Doo-hwan 1983 • Lee Myung-bak 2012 • Park Geun-hye 2014 • Moon Jae-in 2019
Southeast Asia	Philippines	11	Park Chung Hee 1966 • Chun Doo-hwan 1981 • Kim Young-sam 1994, 1996 • Kim Dae-jung 1999 • Roh Moo-hyun 2005 • Lee Myung-bak 2011 • Park Geun-hye 2015 • Moon Jae-in 2017 • Yoon Suk Yeol 2024 • Lee Jae Myung 2026
Southeast Asia	Singapore	11	Chun Doo-hwan 1981 • Kim Young-sam 1996 • Kim Dae-jung 2000 • Roh Moo-hyun 2007 • Lee Myung-bak 2009, 2010 • Park Geun-hye 2015 • Moon Jae-in 2018(2) • Yoon Suk Yeol 2024 • Lee Jae Myung 2026
Southeast Asia	Thailand	7	Park Chung Hee 1966 • Chun Doo-hwan 1981 • Roh Moo-hyun 2003 • Lee Myung-bak 2009(2), 2012 • Moon Jae-in 2019(2)
Southeast Asia	Vietnam	12	Syngman Rhee 1958 • Kim Young-sam 1996 • Kim Dae-jung 1998 • Roh Moo-hyun 2004, 2006 • Lee Myung-bak 2009, 2010 • Park Geun-hye 2013 • Moon Jae-in 2017, 2018 • Yoon Suk Yeol 2023 • Lee Jae Myung 2026
Southwest Asia and Pacific	Australia	9	Park Chung Hee 1968 (2) • Roh Tae-woo 1988 • Kim Young-sam 1994 • Kim Dae-jung 1999 • Roh Moo-hyun 2006 • Lee Myung-bak 2009 • Park Geun-hye 2014 • Moon Jae-in 2021
Southwest Asia and Pacific	India	7	Kim Young-sam 1996 • Roh Moo-hyun 2004 • Lee Myung-bak 2010 • Park Geun-hye 2014 • Moon Jae-in 2018 • Yoon Suk Yeol 2023 • Lee Jae Myung 2026
Southwest Asia and Pacific	New Zealand	5	Park Chung Hee 1968 • Kim Dae-jung 1999 • Roh Moo-hyun 2006 • Lee Myung-bak 2009 • Moon Jae-in 2018
Southwest Asia and Pacific	Papua New Guinea	1	Moon Jae-in 2018
North America	Canada	8	Chun Doo-hwan 1982 • Roh Tae-woo 1991 • Kim Young-sam 1997 • Kim Dae-jung 1999 • Lee Myung-bak 2010 • Park Geun-hye 2014 • Yoon Suk Yeol 2022 • Lee Jae Myung 2025
North America	United States	56	Syngman Rhee 1954 • Park Chung Hee 1965, 1968, 1969 • Chun Doo-hwan 1981, 1985 • Roh Tae-woo 1988, 1989, 1990, 1991(2), 1992 • Kim Young-sam 1993, 1995, 1997 • Kim Dae-jung 1998, 1999, 2000, 2001 • Roh Moo-hyun 2003, 2004, 2005(2), 2006 • Lee Myung-bak 2008(2), 2009(2), 2010, 2011(3), 2012 • Park Geun-hye 2013, 2014, 2015(2), 2016 • Moon Jae-in 2017(2), 2018(2), 2019(2), 2021(2) • Yoon Suk Yeol 2022, 2023(4), 2024 • Lee Jae Myung 2025(2), 2026(2)
Latin America and Caribbean	Argentina	3	Kim Young-sam 1996 • Moon Jae-in 2018 • Lee Jae Myung 2026
Latin America and Caribbean	Brazil	7	Kim Young-sam 1996 • Roh Moo-hyun 2004 • Lee Myung-bak 2008, 2012 • Park Geun-hye 2015 • Yoon Suk Yeol 2024 • Lee Jae Myung 2026
Latin America and Caribbean	Chile	5	Kim Young-sam 1996 • Roh Moo-hyun 2004 • Lee Myung-bak 2012 • Park Geun-hye 2015 • Lee Jae Myung 2026
Latin America and Caribbean	Colombia	2	Lee Myung-bak 2012 • Park Geun-hye 2015
Latin America and Caribbean	Costa Rica	1	Roh Moo-hyun 2005
Latin America and Caribbean	Guatemala	2	Kim Young-sam 1996 • Roh Moo-hyun 2007
Latin America and Caribbean	Mexico	7	Kim Young-sam 1997 • Kim Dae-jung 2002 • Roh Moo-hyun 2005 • Lee Myung-bak 2010, 2012 • Park Geun-hye 2016 • Lee Jae Myung 2026
Latin America and Caribbean	Panama	1	Lee Myung-bak 2010
Latin America and Caribbean	Peru	4	Kim Young-sam 1996 • Lee Myung-bak 2008 • Park Geun-hye 2015 • Yoon Suk Yeol 2024
Europe	Austria	1	Moon Jae-in 2021
Europe	Azerbaijan	1	Roh Moo-hyun 2006
Europe	Belgium	6	Chun Doo-hwan 1986 • Kim Young-sam 1995 • Lee Myung-bak 2010 • Park Geun-hye 2013 • Moon Jae-in 2018 • Lee Jae Myung 2026
Europe	Czech Republic	4	Kim Young-sam 1995 • Park Geun-hye 2015 • Moon Jae-in 2018 • Yoon Suk Yeol 2024
Europe	Denmark	6	Kim Young-sam 1995 • Kim Dae-jung 2002 • Lee Myung-bak 2009, 2011, 2012(Greenland) • Moon Jae-in 2018
Europe	Finland	2	Roh Moo-hyun 2006 • Moon Jae-in 2019
Europe	France	16	Chun Doo-hwan 1986 • Roh Tae-woo 1989 • Kim Young-sam 1995 • Kim Dae-jung 2000, 2001 • Roh Moo-hyun 2004 • Lee Myung-bak 2011(2) • Park Geun-hye 2013, 2015, 2016 • Moon Jae-in 2018 • Yoon Suk Yeol 2023(2) • Lee Jae Myung 2026(2)
Europe	Germany (Note: All subsequent visits by South Korean presidents have been made to the Federal Republic of Germany, which was known colloquially as "West Germany" from 1949 to 1990 during the post World War II West–East division of Germany. No incumbent South Korean president ever visited the German Democratic Republic ("East Germany") during its existence in the same time frame.)	10	Park Chung Hee 1964 • Chun Doo-hwan 1986 • Roh Tae-woo 1989 • Kim Young-sam 1995 • Kim Dae-jung 2000 • Roh Moo-hyun 2005 • Lee Myung-bak 2011 • Park Geun-hye 2014 • Moon Jae-in 2017 • Lee Jae Myung 2026
Europe	Greece	1	Roh Moo-hyun 2006
Europe	Hungary	3	Roh Tae-woo 1989 • Kim Dae-jung 2001 • Moon Jae-in 2021
Europe	Italy	7	Kim Dae-jung 2000 • Roh Moo-hyun 2007 • Lee Myung-bak 2009 • Park Geun-hye 2014 • Moon Jae-in 2018, 2021 • Lee Jae Myung 2026
Europe	Lithuania	1	Yoon Suk Yeol 2023
Europe	Netherlands	3	Kim Dae-jung 2002 • Park Geun-hye 2014 • Yoon Suk Yeol 2023
Europe	Norway	3	Kim Dae-jung 2001 • Lee Myung-bak 2012 • Moon Jae-in 2019
Europe	Poland	2	Roh Moo-hyun 2004 • Yoon Suk Yeol 2023
Europe	Romania	1	Roh Moo-hyun 2006
Europe	Spain	3	Roh Moo-hyun 2007 • Moon Jae-in 2021 • Yoon Suk Yeol 2022
Europe	Sweden	3	Kim Dae-jung 2000 • Lee Myung-bak 2009 • Moon Jae-in 2019
Europe	Switzerland	4	Roh Tae-woo 1989 • Lee Myung-bak 2010 • Park Geun-hye 2014 • Yoon Suk Yeol 2023
Europe	Turkey	5	Roh Moo-hyun 2005 • Lee Myung-bak 2012 • Park Geun-hye 2015 • Lee Jae Myung 2025, 2026
Europe	Ukraine	1	Yoon Suk Yeol 2023
Europe	United Kingdom	11	Chun Doo-hwan 1986 • Roh Tae-woo 1989 • Kim Young-sam 1995 • Kim Dae-jung 1998 • Roh Moo-hyun 2004 • Lee Myung-bak 2009 • Park Geun-hye 2013 • Moon Jae-in 2021(2) • Yoon Suk Yeol 2022, 2023
Europe	Vatican City	7	Kim Dae-jung 2000 • Roh Moo-hyun 2007 • Lee Myung-bak 2009 • Park Geun-hye 2014 • Moon Jae-in 2018, 2021 • Lee Jae Myung 2026
Sub-Saharan Africa	Congo	1	Lee Myung-bak 2011
Sub-Saharan Africa	Ethiopia	2	Lee Myung-bak 2011 • Park Geun-hye 2016
Sub-Saharan Africa	Gabon	1	Chun Doo-hwan 1982
Sub-Saharan Africa	Kenya	2	Chun Doo-hwan 1982 • Park Geun-hye 2016
Sub-Saharan Africa	Nigeria	2	Chun Doo-hwan 1982 • Roh Moo-hyun 2006
Sub-Saharan Africa	Senegal	1	Chun Doo-hwan 1982
Sub-Saharan Africa	South Africa	2	Lee Myung-bak 2011 • Lee Jae Myung 2025
Sub-Saharan Africa	Uganda	1	Park Geun-hye 2016
Middle East and North Africa	Algeria	1	Roh Moo-hyun 2006
Middle East and North Africa	Egypt	3	Roh Moo-hyun 2006 • Moon Jae-in 2022 • Lee Jae Myung 2025
Middle East and North Africa	Iran	1	Park Geun-hye 2016
Middle East and North Africa	Iraq	1	Roh Moo-hyun 2004
Middle East and North Africa	Kuwait	2	Choi Kyu-hah 1980 • Park Geun-hye 2015
Middle East and North Africa	Qatar	3	Lee Myung-bak 2012 • Park Geun-hye 2015 • Yoon Suk Yeol 2023
Middle East and North Africa	Saudi Arabia	6	Choi Kyu-hah 1980 • Roh Moo-hyun 2007 • Lee Myung-bak 2012 • Park Geun-hye 2015 • Moon Jae-in 2022 • Yoon Suk Yeol 2023
Middle East and North Africa	United Arab Emirates	11	Roh Moo-hyun 2006 • Lee Myung-bak 2009, 2011, 2012(2) • Park Geun-hye 2014, 2015 • Moon Jae-in 2018, 2022 • Yoon Suk Yeol 2023 • Lee Jae Myung 2025
Russia and Central Asia	Kazakhstan	7	Roh Moo-hyun 2004 • Lee Myung-bak 2009, 2011, 2012 • Park Geun-hye 2014 • Moon Jae-in 2019 • Yoon Suk Yeol 2024
Russia and Central Asia	Russia	13	Roh Tae-woo 1990 • Kim Young-sam 1994 • Kim Dae-jung 1999 • Roh Moo-hyun 2004, 2005 • Lee Myung-bak 2008, 2010, 2011, 2012 • Park Geun-hye 2013, 2016 • Moon Jae-in 2017, 2018
Russia and Central Asia	Turkmenistan	3	Park Geun-hye 2014 • Moon Jae-in 2019 • Yoon Suk Yeol 2024
Russia and Central Asia	Uzbekistan	6	Roh Moo-hyun 2005 • Lee Myung-bak 2009, 2011 • Park Geun-hye 2014 • Moon Jae-in 2019 • Yoon Suk Yeol 2024

== See also ==
- Foreign policy of South Korea
- Foreign relations of South Korea
