= List of international prime ministerial trips made by Dmitry Medvedev =

List of international trips made by Dmitry Medvedev as Prime Minister

This is a list of international prime ministerial trips made by Dmitry Medvedev during his tenure as Prime Minister of Russia from May 2012 to January 2020.

During his term, Medvedev represented Russia at numerous regional and multilateral summits, including meetings of the Eurasian Economic Union (EAEU), the Shanghai Cooperation Organisation (SCO), the Commonwealth of Independent States (CIS), and ASEAN-related forums across Asia and Europe.

== 2012 ==
Country	Areas visited	Date(s)	Details
United States	Camp David	May 18–19	Attended the 38th G8 summit, representing Russia at the summit in place of President Vladimir Putin.
Kazakhstan	Astana	May 28	Working visit. Medvedev held talks with President Nursultan Nazarbayev and Prime Minister Karim Massimov.
Turkmenistan	Ashgabat	May 30	Attended a meeting of the CIS Council of Heads of Government.
Belarus	Minsk	July 18	Working visit. Attended a meeting of the Union State Council of Ministers and held talks with Belarusian Prime Minister Mikhail Myasnikovich.
Laos	Vientiane	November 5–6	Attended the 9th Asia–Europe Meeting and held bilateral meetings with Laotian officials.
Vietnam	Hanoi	November 6–7	Official visit. Held talks with Prime Minister Nguyễn Tấn Dũng and President Trương Tấn Sang.
Kyrgyzstan	Bishkek	December 4–5	Attended the Shanghai Cooperation Organisation Council of Heads of Government meeting.

== 2013 ==
Country	Areas visited	Date(s)	Details
Switzerland	Davos	January 23–24	Attended the World Economic Forum in Davos.
Brazil	Brasília	February 19–21	Official visit. Medvedev co-chaired the Brazil-Russia High Level Cooperation Commission with Vice-President Michel Temer, focusing on science, technology, trade and investment.
Cuba	Havana	February 21–22	Official visit. Met with President Raúl Castro and other Cuban officials to discuss political and economic cooperation.
Norway	Kirkenes	June 3–4	Working visit. Held talks with Prime Minister Jens Stoltenberg on bilateral relations and cooperation in the Arctic.
Kazakhstan	Astana	September 24–25	Working visit. Participated in a meeting of the Supreme Eurasian Economic Council and held talks with Kazakh officials.
China	Beijing, Hefei	October 21–24	Official visit. Medvedev and Chinese Premier Li Keqiang held the 18th regular meeting of Russian and Chinese heads of government. He also visited the Institute of Plasma Physics and the University of Science and Technology of China in Hefei.

== 2014 ==
Country	Areas visited	Date(s)	Details
Kazakhstan	Astana	February 28	Attended a meeting of the Eurasian Economic Commission and held talks with Kazakh Prime Minister Karim Massimov.
Belarus	Minsk	April 29	Attended a meeting of the Council of Heads of Government of the Commonwealth of Independent States.
Moldova	Chișinău	October 10	Attended the meeting of the CIS Council of Heads of Government.
Myanmar	Naypyidaw	November 12–13	Attended the East Asia Summit and related ASEAN meetings and held bilateral talks with participating leaders.

== 2015 ==
Country	Areas visited	Date(s)	Details
Thailand	Bangkok	April 7–8	Official visit. Held talks with Prime Minister Prayut Chan-o-cha concerning bilateral political, economic and trade relations.
Malaysia	Kuala Lumpur	November 20–22	Attended the ASEAN-related summits and held talks with Malaysian officials.
Cambodia	Phnom Penh	November 22–23	Official visit. Held talks with Cambodian officials and discussed bilateral political and economic cooperation. Medvedev also visited Angkor Wat.
China	Beijing	December 14–18	Attended the Shanghai Cooperation Organisation Council of Heads of Government meeting and held bilateral talks with Chinese officials.

== 2016 ==
Country	Areas visited	Date(s)	Details
Germany	Munich	February 12–13	Attended the Munich Security Conference and held meetings with foreign officials and business representatives.
Singapore	Singapore	May 18–20	Official visit. Held talks with Prime Minister Lee Hsien Loong on bilateral relations and economic cooperation.
Uzbekistan	Samarkand	September 3	Attended the funeral of Uzbek President Islam Karimov.
Laos	Vientiane	September 7–8	Attended the East Asia Summit and ASEAN-related meetings and held bilateral meetings with regional leaders.
Israel	Jerusalem	November 10	Official visit. Met with Prime Minister Benjamin Netanyahu and discussed bilateral relations and counterterrorism.

== 2017 ==
Country	Areas visited	Date(s)	Details
Kyrgyzstan	Bishkek	March 7	Attended a meeting of the Eurasian Intergovernmental Council and held talks with Kyrgyz Prime Minister Sooronbay Zheenbekov and other regional counterparts.
Kazakhstan	Astana	August 14	Attended a meeting of the Eurasian Intergovernmental Council and held talks with President Nursultan Nazarbayev and other regional leaders.
Armenia	Yerevan	October 24–25	Official visit. Held talks with Armenian officials concerning bilateral relations and cooperation within the Eurasian Economic Union.
Philippines	Manila	November 13–14	Attended the 31st ASEAN Summit and related summits. Met with President Rodrigo Duterte and discussed counterterrorism, trade expansion and bilateral cooperation.

== 2018 ==
Country	Areas visited	Date(s)	Details
Armenia	Yerevan	April 24	Attended the meeting of the Eurasian Intergovernmental Council.
Tajikistan	Dushanbe	October 11–12	Attended the Shanghai Cooperation Organisation Council of Heads of Government meeting and held bilateral talks with Tajik officials.
China	Shanghai, Beijing	November 2–7	Official visit. Attended the first China International Import Expo in Shanghai and held the 23rd regular meeting of the Russian and Chinese heads of government with Premier Li Keqiang in Beijing.
Papua New Guinea	Port Moresby	November 17–18	Attended the APEC Economic Leaders' Meeting and related events.

== 2019 ==
Country	Areas visited	Date(s)	Details
Bulgaria	Sofia	March 4–5	Official visit. Held talks with Bulgarian Prime Minister Boyko Borisov concerning bilateral political and economic relations.
Luxembourg	Luxembourg	March 6	Official visit. Held talks with Luxembourg Prime Minister Xavier Bettel and other officials on bilateral relations and economic cooperation.
Uzbekistan	Urgench, Khiva	May 29–30	Official visit. Held talks with President Shavkat Mirziyoyev and Prime Minister Abdulla Aripov and attended the first meeting of the Uzbekistan–Russia Joint Commission at the level of heads of government.
France	Le Havre	June 24	Working visit. Held talks with French Prime Minister Édouard Philippe focusing on bilateral economic relations and international issues.
Serbia	Belgrade	October 19	Official visit. Attended celebrations marking the 75th anniversary of the liberation of Belgrade during World War II and held bilateral talks with President Aleksandar Vučić and Prime Minister Ana Brnabić.
Uzbekistan	Tashkent	November 1–2	Attended the Shanghai Cooperation Organisation Council of Heads of Government meeting and held bilateral meetings with participating leaders.
Thailand	Bangkok	November 2–4	Attended the East Asia Summit and ASEAN-related meetings and held bilateral talks with regional leaders.

== See also ==
- List of international presidential trips made by Vladimir Putin
- List of international prime ministerial trips made by Vladimir Putin
- List of international presidential trips made by Dmitry Medvedev
- List of international presidential trips made by Boris Yeltsin
- List of international trips made by Mikhail Gorbachev
