= List of international presidential trips made by Vladimir Putin =

Since Vladimir Putin was inaugurated as President of Russia on 7 May 2000, he has travelled to 72 countries as of November 2024, in addition to many more domestic trips. This list does not include Putin's trips during his term as Prime Minister of Russia from 8 May 2008 to 7 May 2012 (which he made about 17 trips). Putin, as President, has made at least 395 trips: 196 to Asia, 165 to Europe, 16 to North America, 9 to Africa, 7 to South America and 2 to Oceania.

== Summary ==
World map highlighting countries visited by Vladimir Putin during his presidency, as of November 2026. One visit Two visits Three visits Four visits Five visits Six visits Seven to Thirteen visits Fourteen or more visits Russia including Crimea

President Vladimir Putin's visits by country
Number of visits	Country
1 visit (19)	Algeria; Brunei; Chile; Croatia; Czech Republic; Guatemala; Libya; Luxembourg; Morocco; Nicaragua; Norway; Peru; Qatar; Romania; Singapore; Slovakia; Sweden; Switzerland; Thailand
2 visits (16)	Abkhazia (Note: Abkhazia is a partially recognised state. It is considered by most countries as part of Georgia.); Argentina; Australia; Bulgaria; Canada; Cuba; Indonesia; Jordan; Mexico; Moldova; North Korea; Poland; Portugal; Slovenia; Spain; Syria
3 visits (11)	Brazil; Egypt; Israel; Malaysia; Netherlands; Palestine; Saudi Arabia; Serbia; South Africa; South Korea; United Arab Emirates
4 visits (1)	Mongolia
5 visits (7)	Austria; Belgium; Greece; Hungary; Iran; Japan; Vietnam
6 visits (1)	Vatican City
7 visits (2)	Azerbaijan; United Kingdom
8 visits (2)	Armenia; United States
9 visits (1)	Finland
10 visits (2)	Turkmenistan; Uzbekistan
11 visits (1)	India; Italy
14 visits (3)	Tajikistan; Turkey
16 visits (1)	France
17 visits (1)	Kyrgyzstan
18 visits (1)	Germany
22 visits (1)	Ukraine
24 visits (1)	China
28 visits (1)	Belarus
33 visits (1)	Kazakhstan

== Acting presidency (31 December 1999 – 7 May 2000) ==
Country	Areas visited	Date(s)	Details	Image
Belarus	Minsk	16 April	Met with President Alexander Lukashenko. This was Putin's first foreign visit after becoming acting president. It was also after he won the 2000 Russian presidential election.	
United Kingdom	London	17 April	Met with Queen Elizabeth II and Prime Minister Tony Blair. Also met with British Business executives.	
Ukraine	Sevastopol, Kyiv	18 April	Met with President Leonid Kuchma. Discussed ways to help develop the Black Sea Fleet. Putin also spoke out strongly against NATO expansion.	

== First presidency (2000–2008) ==
=== 2000 ===
Country	Areas visited	Date(s)	Details	Image
Uzbekistan	Tashkent	18–19 May	Met with President Islam Karimov; this was the first foreign visit after Putin's inauguration for the first presidential term.	
Turkmenistan	Ashgabat	18 May	Met with President Saparmurat Niyazov.	
Belarus	Minsk	23–24 May	Met with President Alexander Lukashenko. Also met with Kazakh President Nursultan Nazarbayev, Kyrgyz President Askar Akayev and Armenian president Robert Kocharian.	
Italy	Rome, Milan	3–6 June	Met with Prime Minister Giuliano Amato and President Carlo Azeglio Ciampi.	
Vatican City	Vatican City	5 June	Met with Pope John Paul II.	
Spain	Madrid	13–14 June	Met with Prime Minister Jose Maria Aznar and King Juan Carlos.	
Germany	Berlin	15–16 June	Met with Chancellor Gerhard Schröder and President Johannes Rau.	
Moldova	Chișinău	16–17 June	Met with President Petru Lucinschi.	
Tajikistan	Dushanbe	5 July	Attended the Shanghai Cooperation Organisation.	
China	Beijing	18–19 July	Met with President and Communist Party General Secretary Jiang Zemin.	
North Korea	Pyongyang	19–20 July	Met with Supreme leader and Workers' Party General Secretary Kim Jong Il and participated in a banquet at the Mokran House.	
Japan	Okinawa	21–23 July	Attended the G8 summit.	
Ukraine	Yalta, Foros	18 August	Attended the CIS summit.	
Japan	Tokyo	3–5 September	Official visit. Met with Prime Minister Yoshirō Mori and Emperor Akihito.	
United States	New York City	6–8 September	Attended the Millennium Summit; met with President Bill Clinton.	
India	New Delhi, Agra	2–5 October	State visit. Met with Prime Minister Atal Bihari Vajpayee and President Kocheril Raman Narayanan.	
Kazakhstan	Astana	9–10 October	Attended the Eurasian Economic Community summit.	
Kyrgyzstan	Bishkek	11 October	Attended the CSTO summit.	
France	Paris	30 October – 1 November	Met with President Jacques Chirac and Prime Minister Lionel Jospin. Attended the Russia-EU summit.	
Mongolia	Ulaanbaatar	13–14 November	Official visit. Met with President Natsagiyn Bagabandi and Prime Minister Nambaryn Enhbayar.	
Brunei	Bandar Seri Begawan	15–16 November	Attended the APEC summit.	
Belarus	Minsk	30 November – 1 December	Attended the CIS summit.	
Cuba	Havana	14–17 December	State visit. Met with President and First Secretary of the Communist Party Fidel Castro	
Canada	Ottawa, Toronto	18–19 December	Official Visit. Met with Prime Minister Jean Chrétien and Governor General Adrienne Clarkson.	

=== 2001 ===
Country	Areas visited	Date(s)	Details	Image
Azerbaijan	Baku	9–10 January	Official visit. Met with President Heydar Aliyev.	
Austria	Vienna, St. Christoph am Arlberg	8–11 February	Met with President Thomas Klestil, Chancellor Wolfgang Schüssel, President Vaira Vīķe-Freiberga of Latvia, President Rudolf Schuster of Slovakia, Prime Minister Janez Drnovšek of Slovenia.	
Ukraine	Dnipropetrovsk	12 February	Met with President Leonid Kuchma.	
South Korea	Seoul	27–28 February	State visit. Met with President Kim Dae-jung and Prime Minister Lee Han-dong.	
Vietnam	Hanoi	1–2 March	State visit. Met with President Trần Đức Lương and General Secretary of the Communist Party Lê Khả Phiêu.	
Sweden	Stockholm	23 March	Met with EU Council Members.	
Armenia	Yerevan	24–25 May	Attended the CSTO summit.	
Belarus	Minsk	31 May-1 June	Attended the CIS summit.	
China	Shanghai	14–15 June	Attended the SCO summit.	
Yugoslavia	Belgrade	16–17 June	Met with Yugoslav President Vojislav Kostunica and Serbian prime minister Zoran Đinđić.	
Slovenia	Ljubljana	16 June	Attended the summit meeting with US president George W. Bush.	
Italy	Genoa	16–22 July	Attended the G8 summit.	
Belarus	Vitebsk	25 July	Attended the trilateral summit meeting of Russia, Belarus and Ukraine.	
Ukraine	Crimea, Sevastopol	28–29 July	Met with President Leonid Kuchma.	
Ukraine	Kyiv	23–24 August	Met with President Leonid Kuchma. Marked the 10th Anniversary of Ukraine's Independence.	
Finland	Helsinki	2–3 September	Met with President Tarja Halonen.	
Armenia	Yerevan	14–15 September	Official visit. Met with President Robert Kocharian.	
Germany	Berlin	22–27 September	State visit. Met with Chancellor Gerhard Schröder and President Johannes Rau.	
Belgium	Brussels	1–3 October	Official visit. Met with Prime Minister Guy Verhofstadt and King Albert II.	
China	Shanghai	19–21 October	Working visit to China. Attended the APEC summit.	
Tajikistan	Dushanbe	22 October	Met with President Emomali Rakhmonov.	
United States	Washington, D.C., Houston, Crawford, New York City	7–16 November	State visit. Met with President George W. Bush.	
Greece	Athens	6–8 December	Official visit. Met with Prime Minister Konstantinos Simitis and President Konstantinos Stephanopoulos.	
Germany	Hanover	9 December	Met with Chancellor Gerhard Schröder.	
Ukraine	Kharkiv	14 December	Met with President Leonid Kuchma.	
United Kingdom	Chequers	21–22 December	Met with Prime Minister Tony Blair.	

=== 2002 ===
Country	Areas visited	Date(s)	Details	Image
France	Paris	15 January	Met with President Jacques Chirac.	
Poland	Warsaw, Poznań	16–17 January	Official visit. Met with Prime Minister Leszek Miller and President Aleksander Kwaśniewski.	
Kazakhstan	Almaty	28 February–2 March	Attended the CIS summit.	
Ukraine	Odesa	17 March	Attended the trilateral summit meeting of Russia, Ukraine and Moldova.	
Germany	Weimar	9–10 April	Met with Chancellor Gerhard Schröder.	
Turkmenistan	Ashgabat	23–24 April	Attended the Caspian Summit.	
Italy	Rome	28 May	Attended the Russia-NATO summit.	
Kazakhstan	Almaty	4 June	Attended the Conference on Interaction and Confidence Building Measures in Asia Summit.	
Canada	Kananaskis	26–28 June	Attended the G8 summit.	
Kazakhstan	Aktau	6 July	Attended the informal meeting of the heads of Central Asian states and Russia.	
Moldova	Chișinău	6–7 October	Attended the CIS summit.	
Ukraine	Zaporizhzhia	6 October	Marked the 70th Anniversary of Dnieper Hydroelectric Plant Construction.	
Belgium	Brussels	11 November	Attended the Russia-EU summit.	
Norway	Oslo	12 November	Official visit. Met with King Harald V.	
China	Beijing	27 November–3 December	Official visit. Met with President Jiang Zemin and new-elected Communist Party General Secretary Hu Jintao.	
India	New Delhi	3–4 December	Met with Prime Minister Atal Bihari Vajpayee and President Abdul Kalam.	
Kyrgyzstan	Bishkek	5 December	Met with President Askar Akayev.	

=== 2003 ===
Country	Areas visited	Date(s)	Details	Image
Belarus	Minsk	19–20 January	Met with President Aleksandr Lukashenko.	
Ukraine	Kyiv	27–29 January	Met with President Leonid Kuchma. Attended the CIS summit.	
Germany	Berlin	9 February	Met with Chancellor Gerhard Schröder.	
France	Paris, Bordeaux	10–12 February	State visit. Met with President Jacques Chirac and Prime Minister Jean-Pierre Raffarin.	
Bulgaria	Sofia	1–3 March	State visit. Met with President Georgi Parvanov and Prime Minister Simeon Saxe-Coburg Gotha.	
Tajikistan	Dushanbe	26–27 April	Met with President Emomali Rakhmonov.	
Ukraine	Yalta	30 April 30–4 May	Met with President Leonid Kuchma.	
France	Évian-les-Bains	1–3 June	Attended the G8 summit.	
United Kingdom	London, Edinburgh	22–26 June	State visit; met with UK Prime Minister Tony Blair and Queen Elizabeth II. In Edinburgh, he met with First Minister of Scotland Jack McConnell.	
Malaysia	Kuala Lumpur	5 August	Official visit; met with Prime Minister Mahathir Mohamad and King Sirajuddin.	
Uzbekistan	Samarkand	6 August	Met with President Islam Karimov.	
Italy	Sardinia	29–31 August	Met with Prime Minister Silvio Berlusconi.	
Ukraine	Yalta	17–19 September	Attended the CIS summit.	
United States	New York City, Camp David	20–27 September	Attended the 58th session of the United Nations General Assembly; met with President George W. Bush.	
Malaysia	Kuala Lumpur	16–17 October	Met with Prime Minister Mahathir Mohamad.	
Thailand	Bangkok	17–22 October	State visit. Met with Prime Minister Thaksin Shinawatra and King Bhumibol Adulyadej and attended the APEC summit.	
Kyrgyzstan	Bishkek	23 October	Met with President Askar Akayev.	
Italy	Rome	3–6 November	State visit; met with Prime Minister Silvio Berlusconi and President Carlo Ciampi and attended the Russia-EU summit.	
Vatican City	Vatican City	5 November	State visit. Met with Pope John Paul II.	
France	Paris	7 November	Met with President Jacques Chirac.	

=== 2004 ===
Country	Areas visited	Date(s)	Details	Image
Kazakhstan	Astana	9–10 January	Official visit. Met with President Nursultan Nazarbayev.	
Ukraine	Kyiv	23–24 January	Met with President Leonid Kuchma.	
Ukraine	Yalta	23 April	Met with President Leonid Kuchma and exchanged documents ratifying border and economic agreements.	
Ukraine	Yalta	23–24 May	Meeting of Heads of States Parties to the Agreement on Common Economic Space. This was the first foreign visit after Putin was re-election for his second presidential term.	
France	Arromanche, Caen	6 June	Marked the 60th anniversary of the Allied landings in Normandy.	
Mexico	Mexico City	7 June	Official visit. Met with President Vicente Fox and discussed bilateral economic cooperation.	
United States	Sea Island, Washington, D.C.	8–11 June	Attended the G8 summit and the funeral of former US President Ronald Reagan.	
Uzbekistan	Tashkent	16–17 June	Attended the SCO summit.	
Kazakhstan	Astana	18 June	Participated in meetings in Astana and delivered remarks concerning Eurasian cooperation.	
Ukraine	Chernihiv, Novhorod-Siverskyi	27 June	Met with President Leonid Kuchma and Belarusian President Alexander Lukashenko during a trilateral visit.	
Belarus	Minsk	1 July	Marked the 60th anniversary of the liberation of Belarus.	
Austria	Vienna	10 July	Attended the state funeral of President Thomas Klestil.	
Ukraine	Kyiv	26 July	Met with President Leonid Kuchma.	
Kazakhstan	Astana	15–16 September	Attended the CIS summit.	
China	Beijing	14–15 October	Official visit. Met with President & Communist Party General Secretary Hu Jintao, and Premier Wen Jiabao.	
Tajikistan	Dushanbe	16–18 October	Official visit. Met with President Emomali Rakhmonov. Visited Russia's Military Base.	
Ukraine	Kyiv	26–27 October	Official visit. Attended the 60th anniversary of the liberation of Ukraine.	
Ukraine	Kerch	12 November	Met with President Leonid Kuchma.	
Chile	Santiago	November 19–21	Official visit. Met with President Ricardo Lagos. Attended the APEC summit.	
Brazil	Brasília	22 November	Official visit. Met with President Luiz Inácio Lula da Silva.	
Portugal	Lisbon	23 November	Met with President Jorge Sampaio and Prime Minister Pedro Santana Lopes.	
Netherlands	The Hague	25–26 November	Attended the Russia-EU summit.	
India	New Delhi, Bangalore	3–5 December	Official visit. Met with Prime Minister Manmohan Singh and President Abdul Kalam.	
Turkey	Ankara	5–6 December	Official visit. Met with Prime Minister Recep Tayyip Erdoğan and President Ahmet Necdet Sezer.	
Germany	Hamburg, Schleswig	20–21 December	Met with Chancellor Gerhard Schröder.	

=== 2005 ===
Country	Areas visited	Date(s)	Details	Image
Poland	Kraków	27–28 January	Marked the 60th anniversary of the liberation of Auschwitz.	
Slovakia	Bratislava	24–25 February	Official visit; attended the summit meeting with US president George W. Bush.	
Ukraine	Kyiv	19 March	Met with President Viktor Yushchenko and Prime Minister Yulia Tymoshenko.	
Armenia	Yerevan	24–25 March	Met with President Robert Kocharian.	
Germany	Hanover	10–11 April	Met with Chancellor Gerhard Schröder.	
Egypt	Cairo	26–27 April	Met with President Hosni Mubarak.	
Both Israel and Palestine	Tel Aviv, Jerusalem, Ramallah	27–29 April	Met with Israeli prime minister Ariel Sharon and Palestinian leader Mahmoud Abbas.	
Kazakhstan	Baikonur	2 June	Marked the 50th anniversary of the Baikonur Cosmodrome.	
Kazakhstan	Astana	5 July	Attended the SCO summit.	
United Kingdom	Gleneagles	6–8 July	Attended the G8 summit.	
Finland	Kultaranta. Turku	1–2 August	Met with President Tarja Halonen.	
Germany	Berlin	8 September	Met with Chancellor Gerhard Schröder.	
Greece	Thessaloniki, Mount Athos	8–9 September	Met with Prime Minister Kostas Karamanlis and visited the monasteries of Mount Athos.	
United States	New York City, Bayonne, Washington, D.C.	14–17 September	Attended the 60th session of the United Nations General Assembly and the 2005 World Summit. Met with President George W. Bush.	
Belgium	Brussels	3 October	Official visit.	
United Kingdom	London	4–5 October	Met with UK Prime Minister Tony Blair. Attended the Russia-EU summit.	
Netherlands	The Hague	1–2 November	State visit. Met with Prime Minister Jan Peter Balkenende and Queen Beatrix.	
Turkey	Samsun	17–18 November		
South Korea	Busan	18–19 November	Attended the APEC summit.	
Japan	Tokyo	20–22 November	Official visit. Met with Prime Minister Junichiro Koizumi and Emperor Akihito.	
Malaysia	Kuala Lumpur	13–14 December	Attended the Russia-ASEAN summit.	

=== 2006 ===
Country	Areas visited	Date(s)	Details	Image
Kazakhstan	Astana	10–12 January	Official visit. Met with President Nursultan Nazarbayev.	
Spain	Madrid	8–9 February	State visit. Met with King Juan Carlos.	
Azerbaijan	Baku	21–22 February		
Hungary	Budapest	28 February – 1 March	Official visit.Met with President László Sólyom and Prime Minister Ferenc Gyurcsány.	
Czech Republic	Prague	1–2 March	Official visit. Met with President Václav Klaus.	
Algeria	Algiers	10 March	Official visit.	
China	Beijing	21–22 March	Official visit. Met with President and Communist Party General Secretary Hu Jintao.	
China	Shanghai	14–15 June	Attended the SCO summit.	
Kazakhstan	Almaty	16–18 June		
Belarus	Minsk	23 June	Attended the CSTO summit.	
Greece	Athens	4 September	Attended the trilateral summit meeting of Russia, Greece and Bulgaria.	
South Africa	Cape Town	5–6 September	Official visit; met with President Thabo Mbeki.	
Morocco	Casablanca	7 September	Official visit. Met with King Mohammed VI.	
France	Le Bourget, Paris	22–23 September	Attended the trilateral summit meeting of Russia, France, and Germany.	
Germany	Dresden, Munich, Bavaria	10–11 October	Met with Chancellor Angela Merkel.	
Finland	Lahti	20 October	Attended the Russia-EU summit.	
Vietnam	Hanoi	18–19 November	Official visit. Met with President Nguyễn Minh Triết. Attended the APEC summit.	
Finland	Helsinki	23–24 November	Met with President Tarja Halonen. Attended the Russia-EU summit.	
Belarus	Minsk	28 November	Attended the CIS summit.	
Ukraine	Kyiv	22 December	Met with Prime Minister Viktor Yanukovych.	

=== 2007 ===
Country	Areas visited	Date(s)	Details	Image
India	New Delhi	25–26 January	Official visit; met with Prime Minister Manmohan Singh and President Abdul Kalam.	
Germany	Munich	10 February	Met with Chancellor Angela Merkel.	
Saudi Arabia	Riyadh	11–12 February	Official visit; met with King Abdullah.	
Qatar	Doha	12 February	Visit to Qatar.	
Jordan	Amman	13 February	Official visit. Met with King Abdullah II.	
Italy	Rome, Bari	13–14 March	Met with Prime Minister Romano Prodi and President Giorgio Napolitano.	
Vatican City	Vatican City	13 March	Met with Pope Benedict XVI.	
Greece	Athens	15 March	Attended the trilateral summit meeting of Russia, Greece and Bulgaria.	
Kazakhstan	Astana	10 May	Official visit. Met with President Nursultan Nazarbayev.	
Turkmenistan	Ashgabat	11–12 May	Met with President Gurbanguly Berdymukhammedov. Attended the trilateral summit meeting of Russia, Turkmenistan and Kazakhstan.	
Kazakhstan	Aktau	13 May	President Putin returned to Kazakhstan following his visit to Turkmenistan for further talks with President Nursultan Nazarbayev on regional energy cooperation.	
Austria	Vienna	23–24 May	Official visit. Met with Chancellor Alfred Gusenbauer.	
Luxembourg	Luxembourg City	24 May	Official visit. Met with Grand-Duke Henri and Prime Minister Jean-Claude Juncker	
Germany	Heiligendamm	6–8 June	Attended the G8 summit.	
Croatia	Zagreb	24 June		
Turkey	Istanbul	25 June	Met with Prime Minister Recep Tayyip Erdoğan and President Ahmet Sezer.	
United States	Kennebunkport, Maine	2 July	Met with President George W. Bush.	
Guatemala	Guatemala City	3–5 July	Working visit to Guatemala.	
Kyrgyzstan	Bishkek	16–17 August	Attended the SCO summit.	
Indonesia	Jakarta	6 September	Official visit. Met with President Susilo Bambang Yudhoyono and discussing defense cooperation.	
Australia	Sydney	7–9 September	Official visit. Met with Prime Minister John Howard and Governor General Michael Jeffery. Attended the APEC summit.	
United Arab Emirates	Abu Dhabi	10 September		
Tajikistan	Dushanbe	5–6 October	Attended the CIS summit.	
Germany	Wiesbaden	14–15 October	Met with Chancellor Angela Merkel.	
Iran	Tehran	16 October	Met with President Mahmoud Ahmadinejad.	
Portugal	Lisbon, Mafra	25–26 October	Met with President Aníbal Cavaco Silva and Prime Minister Jose Socrates. Attended the Russia-EU summit.	
Belarus	Minsk	14 December		

=== 2008 ===
Country	Areas visited	Date(s)	Details	Image
Bulgaria	Sofia	17–18 January	Official visit. Met with Prime Minister Sergei Stanishev and President Georgi Parvanov.	
Romania	Bucharest	3–4 April	Attended the Russia-NATO Council.	
Libya	Tripoli	16–17 April	Met with Leader Muammar Gaddafi.	
Italy	Olbia, Gallura	17–18 April	Met with Prime Minister Silvio Berlusconi.	

== Second presidency (2012–present) ==
=== 2012 ===
Country	Areas visited	Date(s)	Details	Image
Belarus	Minsk	31 May – 1 June	Met with President Alexander Lukashenko. This was the first foreign visit after Putin's re-election for a third presidential term.	
Germany	Berlin	1 June	Met with Chancellor Angela Merkel.	
France	Paris	1 June	Met with President François Hollande.	
Uzbekistan	Tashkent	4 June	Met with President Islam Karimov.	
China	Beijing	5–7 June	State visit. Attended the SCO summit.	
Kazakhstan	Astana	7 June	Official visit. Met with President Nursultan Nazarbayev.	
Mexico	Los Cabos	18–20 June	Attended the G20 summit.	
Israel	Jerusalem	25 June	Met with President Shimon Peres and Prime Minister Benjamin Netanyahu.	
Palestine	Bethlehem	26 June	Met with the president of the Palestinian National Authority Mahmoud Abbas.	
Jordan	Amman	26 June	Met with King Abdullah II.	
Ukraine	Yalta	12 July	Met with President Viktor Yanukovych. Met with President Viktor Yanukovich, in the Russo-Ukrainian Inter-state commission in Yalta.	
United Kingdom	London	2 August	Met with Prime Minister David Cameron. Attended the judo finals of the 2012 Summer Olympics.	
Kyrgyzstan	Bishkek	19–20 September	Official visit; met with President Almazbek Atambayev.	
Tajikistan	Dushanbe	5 October	Official visit; met with President Emomali Rahmon.	
Turkey	Istanbul	3 December	Met with Prime Minister Recep Tayyip Erdoğan.	
Turkmenistan	Ashgabat	5 December	Attended the CIS summit.	
Belgium	Brussels	20–21 December	Official visit. Attended the Russia-EU summit.	
India	New Delhi	24 December	Official visit. Met with Prime Minister Manmohan Singh and President Pranab Mukherjee.	

=== 2013 ===
Region	Areas visited	Date(s)	Details	Image
South Africa	Durban	26–27 March	Attended the 5th BRICS summit.	
Germany	Hanover	8 April	Met with Chancellor Angela Merkel.	
Netherlands	Amsterdam	8 April	Met with Queen Beatrix and Prime Minister Mark Rutte.	
Kyrgyzstan	Bishkek	28 May	Attended the CSTO summit.	
Kazakhstan	Astana	29 May		
United Kingdom	London, Lough Erne	16–18 June	Met with Prime Minister David Cameron; attended the G8 summit.	
Finland	Turku	25 June	Met with President Sauli Niinistö.	
Kazakhstan	Astana	7 July	Met with President Nursultan Nazarbayev.	
Ukraine	Kyiv, Sevastopol	27–28 July	Met with President Viktor Yanukovych.	
Azerbaijan	Baku	13 August	Met with President Ilham Aliyev.	
Abkhazia	Pitsunda	25 August	Met with President Alexander Ankvab.	
Kyrgyzstan	Bishkek	13 September	Attended the SCO summit.	
Indonesia	Bali	7–8 October	Attended the APEC summit.	
Belarus	Minsk	24–25 October	Summit of Euro-Asian Economic Council and attended the CIS summit.	
Vietnam	Hanoi	12 November	Official visit. Met with President Trương Tấn Sang, Prime Minister Nguyễn Tấn Dũng and General Secretary of the Communist Party Nguyễn Phú Trọng	
South Korea	Seoul	13 November	Official visit; met with President Park Geun-hye.	
Vatican City	Vatican City	25 November	Met with Pope Francis.	
Italy	Rome, Trieste	25–26 November	Met with Prime Minister Enrico Letta and President Giorgio Napolitano.	
Armenia	Gyumri, Yerevan	2 December	State visit; met with President Serzh Sargsyan.	

=== 2014 ===
Country	Areas visited	Date(s)	Details	Image
Belgium	Brussels	28 January	Official visit. Attended the Russia-EU summit.	
Belarus	Minsk	29 April	Supreme Eurasian Economic Council meeting.	
China	Shanghai	20–21 May	Official visit. Met with President and Communist Party General Secretary Xi Jinping. Participating in Conference on Interaction and Confidence-Building Measures in Asia.	
Kazakhstan	Astana	29 May	Meeting of the Supreme Eurasian Economic Council.	
France	Paris, Deauville, Ouistreham	5–6 June	Met with President François Hollande. Marked the 70th anniversary of D-Day and the Battle of Normandy.	
Austria	Vienna	24 June	Official visit. Met with President Heinz Fischer.	
Belarus	Minsk	2 July	Met with President Alexander Lukashenko. Marked the 70th anniversary of the liberation of Belarus.	
Cuba	Havana	11 July	Official visit. Met with President and First Secretary of the Communist Party Raúl Castro.	
Nicaragua	Managua	12 July	Met with President Daniel Ortega.	
Argentina	Buenos Aires	12 July	Met with President Cristina Fernández de Kirchner.	
Brazil	Fortaleza, Brasília, Rio de Janeiro	13–17 July	Official Visit. Met with President Dilma Rousseff. Attended the FIFA World Cup final. Attended the 6th BRICS summit.	
Belarus	Minsk	26 August	Met with President Alexander Lukashenko, Ukrainian president Petro Poroshenko, and leaders of Eurasian Customs Union.	
Mongolia	Ulaanbaatar	3 September	Met with President Tsakhiagiin Elbegdorj.	
Tajikistan	Dushanbe	11–12 September	Attended the SCO summit.	
Kazakhstan	Atyrau	30 September		
Belarus	Minsk	10 October	Attended the Eurasian Economic Union Summit.	
Serbia	Belgrade	16 October	Met with President Tomislav Nikolić and Prime Minister Aleksandar Vučić. Marked the 70th anniversary of the liberation of Belgrade.	
Italy	Milan	16–17 October	Attended the 11th ASEM. Met with Prime Minister Matteo Renzi, French president François Hollande, German chancellor Angela Merkel, Ukrainian president Petro Poroshenko, European Council president Herman Van Rompuy and European Commission president José Manuel Barroso.	
China	Beijing	9–11 November	Attended the APEC summit.	
Australia	Brisbane	14–16 November	Attended the G20 summit.	
Turkey	Ankara	1–3 December	State visit. Met with President Recep Tayyip Erdoğan and Prime Minister Ahmet Davutoğlu.	
Uzbekistan	Tashkent	8–10 December	Met with President Islam Karimov.	
India	New Delhi	10–12 December	Official visit. Met with Prime Minister Narendra Modi and President Pranab Mukherjee.	

=== 2015 ===
Country	Areas visited	Date(s)	Details	Image
Egypt	Cairo	9–10 February	Official visit. Met with President Abdel Fattah el-Sisi.	
Belarus	Minsk	11–12 February	Met with President Alexander Lukashenko, Ukrainian president Petro Poroshenko, French president François Hollande and German chancellor Angela Merkel.	
Hungary	Budapest	17 February	Met with Prime Minister Viktor Orbán.	
Kazakhstan	Astana	19–20 March	Attended the trilateral summit meeting of Russia, Kazakhstan and Belarus.	
Armenia	Yerevan	24 April	Marked the 100th anniversary of the Armenian genocide.	
Italy	Milan, Rome	10 June	Attended the Expo 2015. Met with Prime Minister Matteo Renzi and President Sergio Mattarella.	
Vatican City	Vatican City	10 June	Met with Pope Francis.	
Azerbaijan	Baku	12–13 June	Met with President Ilham Aliyev.	
China	Beijing	2–3 September	Met with President & Communist Party General Secretary Xi Jinping, and Premier Li Keqiang. Attended the China Victory Day Parade to mark the 70th anniversary of anti-Japanese Fascists war victory in Beijing.	
Tajikistan	Dushanbe	14–15 September	Attended the CSTO summit.	
United States	New York City	28–29 September	Attended the 70th Regular Session of the United Nations General Assembly. Met with President Barack Obama.	
France	Paris	2 October	Met with President François Hollande, German chancellor Angela Merkel, and Ukrainian president Petro Poroshenko.	
Kazakhstan	Astana	14–16 October	State visit. Attended the CIS summit.	
Turkey	Antalya	15–16 November	Attended the G20 summit.	
Iran	Tehran	23 November	Met with President Hassan Rouhani.	
France	Paris	30 November	Attended the UN Climate Change Conference.	

=== 2016 ===
Country	Areas visited	Date(s)	Details	Image
Belarus	Minsk	25 February	Meeting of the Supreme State Council of the Union State of Russia and Belarus.	
Greece	Athens	27–28 May	Met with Prime Minister Alexis Tsipras and President Prokopis Pavlopoulos.	
Kazakhstan	Astana	30–31 May	Supreme Eurasian Economic Council meeting.	
Belarus	Minsk	8 June	Met with President Alexander Lukashenko.	
Uzbekistan	Tashkent	23–24 June	Attended the SCO summit.	
China	Beijing	24–25 June	Met with President & Communist Party General Secretary Xi Jinping, and Premier Li Keqiang.	
Finland	Naantali	1 July	Met with President Sauli Niinistö.	
Slovenia	Ljubljana	30 July	Met with President Borut Pahor.	
Azerbaijan	Baku	8 August	Attended trilateral summit meeting of Russia, Azerbaijan, and Iran.	
China	Hangzhou	3–5 September	Attended the G20 summit.	
Uzbekistan	Samarkand	6 September	Attended the funeral of the former president of Uzbekistan Islam Karimov.	
Kyrgyzstan	Bishkek	17 September	Attended the CIS summit.	
Kazakhstan	Astana	4 October	Met with President of Nursultan Nazarbayev.	
Turkey	Istanbul	10 October	Met with President Recep Tayyip Erdoğan.	
Armenia	Yerevan	14 October	Attended the CSTO summit.	
India	Benaulim	15–16 October	Attended the 8th BRICS summit.	
Germany	Berlin	19–20 October	Met with Chancellor Angela Merkel, French president François Hollande, and Ukrainian president Petro Poroshenko.	
Peru	Lima	19–20 November	Attended the APEC summit.	
Japan	Nagato, Tokyo	15–16 December	Met with Prime Minister Shinzō Abe.	

=== 2017 ===
Country	Areas visited	Date(s)	Details	Image
Hungary	Budapest	2 February	Met with Prime Minister Viktor Orbán.	
Kazakhstan	Almaty	27 February	Met with President Nursultan Nazarbayev.	
Tajikistan	Dushanbe	27–28 February	Official visit. Met with President Emomali Rahmon.	
Kyrgyzstan	Bishkek	28 February	Official visit; met with President Almazbek Atambayev.	
Kyrgyzstan	Bishkek	14 April	Attended the Eurasian Economic Union summit and CSTO summit.	
China	Beijing	14–15 May	Met with President & Communist Party General Secretary Xi Jinping, and Premier Li Keqiang.	
France	Paris	29 May	Met with President Emmanuel Macron.	
Kazakhstan	Astana	8–9 June	Attended the SCO summit.	
Germany	Hamburg	7–8 July	Attended the G20 summit.	
Finland	Savonlinna, Punkaharju	27 July	Met with President Sauli Niinistö.	
Abkhazia	Pitsunda	8 August	Met with de facto President Raul Khajimba.	
Hungary	Budapest	28 August	Met with Prime Minister Viktor Orbán.	
China	Xiamen	3–5 September	Attended the 9th BRICS summit.	
Turkey	Ankara	28 September	Met with President Recep Tayyip Erdoğan.	
Turkmenistan	Ashgabat	2 October	Met with President Gurbanguly Berdimuhamedov.	
Iran	Tehran	1 November	Attended trilateral summit meeting of Russia, Azerbaijan, and Iran.	
Vietnam	Da Nang	10–11 November	Attended the APEC Vietnam 2017 summit.	
Belarus	Minsk	30 November	Attended the CSTO summit.	
Syria	Khmeimim Air Base	11 December	Met with President Bashar al-Assad.	
Egypt	Cairo	11 December	Met with President Abdel Fattah el-Sisi.	
Turkey	Ankara	11 December	Met with President Recep Tayyip Erdoğan.	

=== 2018 ===
Country	Areas visited	Date(s)	Details	Image
Turkey	Ankara	3–4 April	Attended a trilateral summit meeting between Russia, Turkey, and Iran.	
Austria	Vienna	5 June	Met with President Alexander Van der Bellen and Chancellor Sebastian Kurz. This was Putin's first foreign visit since his re-election for a fourth presidential term.	
China	Beijing, Tianjin, Qingdao	8–10 June	State visit; met with President & Communist Party General Secretary Xi Jinping, and Premier Li Keqiang and attended the SCO summit.	
Belarus	Minsk	19 June	Meeting of the Supreme State Council of the Union State of Russia and Belarus.	
Finland	Helsinki	16 July	Met with US president Donald Trump at a summit meeting.	
South Africa	Johannesburg	25–27 July	Attended the 10th BRICS summit.	
Kazakhstan	Aktau	12 August	Attended a summit of Caspian leaders.	
Germany	Berlin	18 August	Met with Chancellor Angela Merkel.	
Iran	Tehran	7 September	Attended a trilateral summit meeting between Russia, Turkey, and Iran.	
Azerbaijan	Baku	27 September	Met with President Ilham Aliyev.	
Tajikistan	Dushanbe	28 September	Attended the CIS summit.	
India	New Delhi	4–5 October	Met with Prime Minister Narendra Modi and President Ram Nath Kovind.	
Belarus	Mogilev	12 October	Met with President Alexander Lukashenko.	
Uzbekistan	Tashkent	19 October	State visit; met with President Shavkat Mirziyoyev.	
Kazakhstan	Saryagash	20 October	Met with Nursultan Nazarbayev and Shavkat Mirziyoyev.	
Turkey	Istanbul	27 October	Met with President Recep Tayyip Erdoğan, German chancellor Angela Merkel, and French president Emmanuel Macron.	
Kazakhstan	Astana; Petropavl	8–9 November	Attended the CSTO summit and XV Forum of Interregional Cooperation of Russia and Kazakhstan.	
France	Paris	11 November	Marked the 100th anniversary of the Armistice with Germany that brought major hostilities of World War I to an end. Later attended the opening of the first Paris Peace Forum.	
Singapore	Central Area	13–15 November	State visit; attended the East Asia Summit.	
Turkey	Istanbul	19 November	Met with President Recep Tayyip Erdoğan.	
Argentina	Buenos Aires	30 November – 2 December	Attended the G20 summit.	

=== 2019 ===
Country	Areas visited	Date(s)	Details	Image
Serbia	Belgrade	17 January	Official visit; met with President Aleksandar Vučić.	
Kyrgyzstan	Bishkek	28 March	State visit; met with President Sooronbay Jeenbekov.	
China	Beijing	25–27 April	Working visit; met with President and Communist Party General Secretary Xi Jinping.	
Kazakhstan	Nur-Sultan	29–30 May	Working visit.	
Kyrgyzstan	Bishkek	13–15 June	Attended the SCO summit.	
Tajikistan	Dushanbe	15–16 June	Attended the Conference on Interaction and Confidence-Building Measures in Asia	
Japan	Osaka	28–29 June	Attended the G20 summit.	
Belarus	Minsk	30 June	Attended the closing ceremony of the 2019 European Games.	
Italy	Rome	4 July	Official visit. Met with President Sergio Mattarella and Prime Minister Giuseppe Conte.	
Vatican City	Vatican City	4 July	Official visit. Met with Pope Francis.	
France	Fort de Brégançon, Bormes-les-Mimosas	19 August	Working visit. Met with President Emmanuel Macron.	
Finland	Helsinki	21 August	Working visit.	
Mongolia	Ulaanbaatar	3 September	Official visit. Attended the 80th anniversary of the Battle of Khalkhin Gol.	
Turkey	Ankara	16 September	Working visit. Attended a trilateral summit meeting of Russia, Turkey, and Iran.	
France	Paris	30 September	Attended the funeral of former President Jacques Chirac.	
Armenia	Yerevan	1 October	Working visit.	
Turkmenistan	Ashgabat	10–11 October	Working visit. Attended the CIS summit.	
Saudi Arabia	Riyadh	14 October	State visit.	
United Arab Emirates	Abu Dhabi	15 October	State visit.	
Hungary	Budapest	30 October	Working visit.	
Brazil	Brasília	13–14 November	Attended the 11th BRICS summit.	
Kyrgyzstan	Bishkek	28 November	Attended the CSTO summit.	
France	Paris	9 December	Met with President Emmanuel Macron, German chancellor Angela Merkel and Ukrainian president Volodymyr Zelenskyy.	

=== 2020 ===
Country	Areas visited	Date(s)	Details	Image
Syria	Damascus	7 January	Met with President Bashar al-Assad.	
Turkey	Istanbul	8 January	Met with President Recep Tayyip Erdoğan.	
Germany	Berlin	19 January	Working visit. Attended a meeting on the Libyan Civil War and held a meeting with British prime minister Boris Johnson.	
Israel	Jerusalem	23 January	Putin travelled to Jerusalem for the World Holocaust Forum to commemorate the 75 years since the liberation of the Auschwitz-Birkenau death camp. Putin also met with Prime Minister Benjamin Netanyahu.	
Palestine	Bethlehem	23 January	Putin travelled to Bethlehem to discuss Palestine–Russia relations and other issues in the Middle East.	

=== 2021 ===
Country	Areas visited	Date(s)	Details	Image
Switzerland	Geneva	16 June	Met with US president Joe Biden at a summit meeting.	
India	New Delhi	6 December	Met with Prime Minister Narendra Modi.	

=== 2022 ===
Country	Areas visited	Date(s)	Details	Image
China	Beijing	4–5 February	Met with President and Communist Party General Secretary Xi Jinping. Attended the opening ceremony of the 2022 Winter Olympics.	
Tajikistan	Dushanbe	28 June	Met with President Emomali Rahmon.	
Turkmenistan	Ashgabat	29 June	Attended the Caspian Summit.	
Iran	Tehran	19 July	Met with Iranian Supreme Leader Ali Khamenei and held a summit meeting with Turkish president Recep Tayyip Erdoğan.	
Uzbekistan	Samarkand	15–16 September	Attended the SCO summit.	
Kazakhstan	Astana	13–15 October	Attended the CICA and CIS summits.	
Armenia	Yerevan	22–23 November	Attended the CSTO summit.	
Kyrgyzstan	Bishkek	9 December	EAEU Summit	
Belarus	Minsk	19 December	Working visit.	

=== 2023 ===
Country	Areas visited	Date(s)	Details	Image
Kyrgyzstan	Bishkek	12–14 October	Working visit. Attended the CIS Summit. Met with Sadyr Japarov and Ilham Aliyev.	
China	Beijing	17–18 October	Working visit. Attended the Third Belt and Road Forum. Met with several world leaders, including Viktor Orbán, Võ Văn Thưởng, Thongloun Sisoulith, Xi Jinping, Srettha Thavisin, Kassym-Jomart Tokayev, Shavkat Mirziyoyev, Anwaar-ul-Haq Kakar, and Ukhnaagiin Khürelsükh.	
Kazakhstan	Astana	9–10 November	Working visit.	
Belarus	Minsk	23–24 November	Attended the CSTO summit.	
United Arab Emirates	Abu Dhabi	6 December	Working visit.	
Saudi Arabia	Riyadh	6 December	Working visit.	

=== 2024 ===
Country	Areas visited	Date(s)	Details	Image
China	Beijing, Harbin	16–17 May	State visit. Met with President and Communist Party General Secretary Xi Jinping in Beijing. Visited Harbin, which has strong ties to Russia, for a trade and investment exposition. This was Putin's first foreign visit since his re-election for a fifth presidential term.	
Belarus	Minsk	23–24 May	Met with President Alexander Lukashenko.	
Uzbekistan	Tashkent	26–27 May	Met with President Shavkat Mirziyoyev.	
North Korea	Pyongyang	18–19 June	State visit. Met with Supreme Leader and Workers' Party General Secretary Kim Jong Un. See Kim–Putin meetings.	
Vietnam	Hanoi	19–20 June	State visit. Met with Communist Party General Secretary Nguyễn Phú Trọng, President Tô Lâm, Prime Minister Phạm Minh Chính and Chairman of the National Assembly Trần Thanh Mẫn.	
Kazakhstan	Astana	3–4 July	Attended the SCO summit.	
Azerbaijan	Baku	18–19 August	Met with President Ilham Aliyev.	
Mongolia	Ulaanbaatar	2–3 September	Met with Foreign Minister Battsetseg Batmunkh and President Ukhnaagiin Khürelsükh.	
Turkmenistan	Asgabat	11 October	Attending "Interconnection of Times and Civilizations - Basis of Peace and Development" international forum dedicated to the 300th anniversary of the birth of Turkmen poet and thinker Makhtumkuli Fraghi.	
Kazakhstan	Astana	27–28 November	State visit. Attended the CSTO summit.	
Belarus	Minsk	6 December	Met with President Alexander Lukashenko for Union State summit.	

=== 2025 ===
Country	Areas visited	Date(s)	Details	Image
Belarus	Minsk	26–27 June	Attended Summit for tenth anniversary of the Eurasian Economic Union.	
United States	Anchorage	15 August	Attended a summit with President Donald Trump at Joint Base Elmendorf–Richardson. First visit to an "unfriendly country" since the start of the Russian invasion of Ukraine.	
China	Tianjin	31 August – 3 September	Attended the SCO summit.	
China	Beijing	31 August – 3 September	Attended the China Victory Day Parade to mark the 80th anniversary of anti-Japanese Fascists war victory. Met with President and Communist Party General Secretary Xi Jinping and North Korean Supreme Leader and Workers' Party General Secretary Kim Jong Un.	
Tajikistan	Dushanbe	8–10 October	Attended the CIS summit.	
Kyrgyzstan	Bishkek	25–27 November	State visit. Attended the CSTO summit.	
India	New Delhi	4–5 December	State visit. Met President Droupadi Murmu and Prime Minister Narendra Modi and attended the 23rd India – Russia summit. Year 2025 marked the 25th anniversary of the Declaration on Strategic Partnership between India and Russia. Also attended the India - Russia Business forum and Launched RT India channel.	
Turkmenistan	Asgabat	11–12 December	Attended "International Year of Peace and Trust forum" an international forum held to mark the 30th anniversary of Turkmenistan's permanent neutrality.	

=== 2026 ===
Country	Areas visited	Date(s)	Details	Image
China	Beijing	19–20 May	State visit. Met with President and Communist Party General Secretary Xi Jinping to celebrate the 25th anniversary of the Treaty of Good-Neighbourliness and Friendly Cooperation between Russia and China..	
Kazakhstan	Astana	27–29 May	Attended the summit of the Eurasian Economic Union. Met with President Kassym-Jomart Tokayev.	
Kyrgyzstan	Bishkek	31 August – 1 September	Attended the SCO summit and the opening ceremony of the 6th World Nomad Games.	
India	New Delhi	11–13 September	Attended the 18th BRICS summit.	
Turkmenistan	Avaza National Tourist Zone	8–9 October	Attended the CIS summit.	
China	Shenzhen	17–19 November	Attended the APEC Summit and addressed the APEC CEO Forum. Held bilateral meetings, including with President Xi Jinping and U.S. President Donald Trump, as well as a trilateral meeting with both of them. He also visited the Shenzhen MSU–BIT University.	
Tajikistan	Dushanbe	20 November	Working visit. Met with President Emomali Rahmon.	

== Multilateral meetings ==
=== First presidency ===
Multilateral meetings of the following intergovernmental organizations took place during Vladimir Putin's first presidency (2000–2008)

Group	Year								
Group	2000	2001	2002	2003	2004	2005	2006	2007	2008
APEC	15–16 November, (Brunei) Bandar Seri Begawan	20–21 October, (China) Shanghai	26–27 October^{[a]}, (Mexico) Los Cabos	20–21 October, (Thailand) Bangkok	20–21 October, (Chile) Santiago	18–19 November, (South Korea) Busan	18–19 November, (Vietnam) Hanoi	8–9 September, (Australia) Sydney	
CIS	25 January, (Russia) Moscow; 21 June, (Russia) Moscow; 1 December, (Belarus) Minsk	1 June, (Belarus) Minsk; 30 November, (Russia) Moscow	7 October, (Moldova) Chișinău	19 September, (Ukraine) Yalta, Crimea	16 September, (Kazakhstan) Astana	26 August, (Russia) Kazan	28 November, (Belarus) Minsk	5 October, (Tajikistan) Dushanbe	
G8	21–23 July, (Japan) Nago	21–22 July, (Italy) Genoa	26–27 June, (Canada) Kananaskis	1–2 June, (France) Évian-les-Bains	8–10 June, (United States) Sea Island	6–8 July, (United Kingdom) Gleneagles	15–17 July, (Russia) St. Petersburg	6–8 June, (Germany) Heiligendamm	
NATO	Not Invited		28 May, (Italy) Rome	none	Not Invited		none	Not Invited	3–4 April, (Romania) Bucharest
SCO	Didn't exist	14–15 June, (China) Shanghai	7 June, (Russia) Saint Petersburg	29 May, (Russia) Moscow	17 June, (Uzbekistan) Tashkent	5 July, (Kazakhstan) Astana	15 June, (China) Shanghai	16 August, (Kyrgyzstan) Bishkek	
Others	None	None	Russia-EU; 11 November, (Belgium) Brussels	None	Russia-EU; 25–26 November, (Netherlands) The Hague	Russia-ASEAN; 13–14 December, (Malaysia) Kuala Lumpur	Russia-EU; 23–24 November, (Finland) Helsinki	None	None
██ = Did not attend^aPrime Minister Mikhail Kasyanov attended in the President's place.

=== Second presidency ===
Multilateral meetings of the following intergovernmental organizations took place during Vladimir Putin's second presidency (2012–present)

Group	Year														
Group	2012	2013	2014	2015	2016	2017	2018	2019	2020	2021	2022	2023	2024	2025	2026
APEC	9–10 September, (Russia) Vladivostok	5–7 October, (Indonesia) Bali	10–11 November, (China) Beijing	18–19 November,^{[e]} (Philippines) Manila	19–20 November, (Peru) Lima	10–11 November, (Vietnam) Đà Nẵng	17–18 November,^{[e]} (Papua New Guinea) Port Moresby	16–17 November, (Chile) Santiago (cancelled)	20 November, (Malaysia) Kuala Lumpur	12 November, (New Zealand) Auckland	18–19 November,^{[c]} (Thailand) Bangkok	12–18 November,^{[d]} (United States) San Francisco	15–16 November,^{[d]} (Peru) Lima	31 October–1 November,^{[d]} (South Korea) Gyeongju	November 18–19, (China) Shenzhen
BRICS		26–27 March, (South Africa) Durban	14–16 July, (Brazil) Fortaleza	8–9 July, (Russia) Ufa	15–16 October, (India) Benaulim	3–5 September, (China) Xiamen	25–27 July, (South Africa) Johannesburg	13–14 November, (Brazil) Brasília	17 November, (Russia) Saint Petersburg	9 September, (India) New Delhi	23 June, (China) Beijing	22–24 August, (South Africa) Johannesburg	22–24 October, (Russia) Kazan	6–7 July, (Brazil) Rio de Janeiro	12–13 September, (India) New Delhi
CIS	5 December, (Turkmenistan) Ashgabat	25 October, (Belarus) Minsk	10 October, (Belarus) Minsk	16 October, (Kazakhstan) Astana	16 September, (Kyrgyzstan) Bishkek	11 October, (Russia) Sochi	28 September, (Tajikistan) Dushanbe	11 October, (Turkmenistan) Ashgabat	18 December, (Uzbekistan) Tashkent	15 October, (Belarus) Minsk	15 October, (Kazakhstan) Astana	13 October, (Kyrgyzstan) Bishkek	8 October, (Russia) Moscow	10 October, (Tajikistan) Dushanbe	9 October, (Turkmenistan) Awaza
CSTO	15 May, (Russia) Moscow	23 September, (Russia) Sochi	23 December, (Russia) Moscow	15 September, (Tajikistan) Dushanbe; 21 December, (Russia) Moscow	14 October, (Armenia) Yerevan	30 November, (Belarus) Minsk	8 November, (Kazakhstan) Astana	28 November, (Kyrgyzstan) Bishkek	2 December, (Russia) Moscow	16 September, (Tajikistan) Dushanbe	16 May, (Russia) Moscow; 23 November, (Armenia) Yerevan	23 November, (Belarus) Minsk	28 November, (Kazakhstan) Astana	27 November, (Kyrgyzstan) Bishkek	11 November, (Russia) Moscow
G8 / G7	18–19 May,^{[e]} (United States) Camp David	17–18 June, (United Kingdom) Enniskillen	Not a G7 Member												
G-20	18–19 June, (Mexico) Los Cabos	5–6 September, (Russia) Saint Petersburg	15–16 November, (Australia) Brisbane	15–16 November, (Turkey) Antalya	4–5 September, (China) Hangzhou	7–8 July, (Germany) Hamburg	30 November–1 December, (Argentina) Buenos Aires	28–29 June, (Japan) Osaka	21–22 November, (Saudi Arabia) Riyadh	30–31 October,^{[b]} (Italy) Rome	15–16 November^{[a]}, (Indonesia) Bali	9–10 September,^{[a]} (India) New Delhi	18–19 November,^{[a]} (Brazil) Rio de Janeiro	22–23 November,^{[d]} (South Africa) Johannesburg	14–15 December, (United States) Miami
SCO	6–7 June, (China) Beijing	13 September, (Kyrgyzstan) Bishkek	11–12 September, (Tajikistan) Dushanbe	9–10 July, (Russia) Ufa	23–24 June, (Uzbekistan) Tashkent	8–9 June, (Kazakhstan) Astana	7–8 June, (China) Qingdao	14–15 June, (Kyrgyzstan) Bishkek	10 November, (Russia) Sochi	16–17 September, (Tajikistan) Dushanbe	15–16 September, (Uzbekistan) Samarkand	4 July, (India) Goa	3–4 July, (Kazakhstan) Astana	31 August – 1 September, (China) Tianjin	31 August – 1 September, (Kyrgyzstan) Bishkek
Others	Russia–EU; 20–21 December, (Belgium) Brussels	None	Russia–EU; 28 January, (Belgium) Brussels	Normandy Format; 11–12 February, (Belarus) Minsk	Normandy Format; 19 October, (Germany); Berlin	None	None	First Russia-Africa Summit; 23–24 October, Sochi	None	None	None	Second Russia–Africa Summit; 27–28 July, Saint Petersburg	None	None	Third Russia–Africa Summit; 28–29 October, Moscow
Others	Russia–EU; 20–21 December, (Belgium) Brussels	None	Normandy Format; 6 June, (France) Château de Bénouville	Normandy Format; 2 October, (France); Paris	Normandy Format; 19 October, (Germany); Berlin	None	None	Normandy Format; 9 December, (France); Paris	None	None	None	Second Russia–Africa Summit; 27–28 July, Saint Petersburg	None	None	Third Russia–Africa Summit; 28–29 October, Moscow
Others	Russia–EU; 20–21 December, (Belgium) Brussels	None	Normandy Format; 16–17 October, (Italy); Milan	UNCCC; 30 November, (France); Paris	Normandy Format; 19 October, (Germany); Berlin	None	None		None	None	None	Second Russia–Africa Summit; 27–28 July, Saint Petersburg	None	None	Third Russia–Africa Summit; 28–29 October, Moscow
██ = Future event ██ = Did not attend ██ = Video conference^aMinister of Foreign Affairs Sergey Lavrov attended in the President's place.^bMinister of Finance Anton Siluanov attended in the President's place.^cDeputy Prime Minister Andrey Belousov attended in the President's place.^dDeputy Chairman of the Government Alexey Overchuk attended in the President's place.^ePrime Minister Dmitry Medvedev attended in the President's place.

== See also ==
- List of international prime ministerial trips made by Vladimir Putin
- List of international presidential trips made by Dmitry Medvedev
- List of international presidential trips made by Boris Yeltsin
- List of international trips made by Mikhail Gorbachev
