= List of international trips made by Nikita Khrushchev =

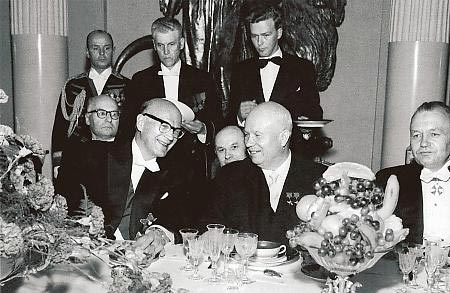
Khrushchev attending Kekkonen's 60th birthday party in Presidential Palace, Helsinki.

This is a list of international visits made by Nikita Khrushchev during his tenure as First Secretary of the Communist Party of the Soviet Union (1953–1964) and Chairman of the Council of Ministers of the Soviet Union (1958–1964). Unlike his predecessor Joseph Stalin, who rarely traveled outside the USSR, Khrushchev was the first Soviet leader to make frequent state visits to foreign nations.

== Summary of visits ==
=== 1950s ===
Date	Country	Locations visited	Details
October 1954	China	Beijing	Met with Chairman Mao Zedong. Attended the Chinese National Day Parade.
May 1955	Yugoslavia	Belgrade	Accompanied by Premier Nikolai Bulganin. Met with Josip Broz Tito.
July 1955	Switzerland	Geneva	Attended the Geneva Summit.
September 1955	West Germany	Bonn	Met with Konrad Adenauer.
November–December 1955	India	New Delhi	Official visit.
November–December 1955	Burma	Rangoon	Official visit.
November–December 1955	Kingdom of Afghanistan	Kabul	Official visit.
April 1956	United Kingdom	London, Portsmouth	Accompanied by Premier Nikolai Bulganin. They arrived via the Soviet cruiser Ordzhonikidze.
June 1956	Yugoslavia	Brioni Islands	Solidified the "Belgrade Declaration".
October 1956	Poland	Warsaw	Met with Władysław Gomułka.
November 1956	Yugoslavia	Brijuni	Official visit.
November 1956	People's Republic of Bulgaria	Sofia	Official visit.
6-13 June 1957	Finland	Helsinki	Official visit. Accompanied by Premier Nikolai Bulganin.
April 1958	Hungarian People's Republic	Budapest	Official visit.
July–August 1958	China	Beijing	Met with Mao Zedong.
July 1959	Poland	Warsaw, Katowice	State visit.
September 15–27, 1959	United States	Washington, D.C., New York City, Los Angeles, San Francisco, Coon Rapids	Main article: State visit by Nikita Khrushchev to the United States
1 October 1959	China	Beijing	Main article: 10th anniversary of the People's Republic of China

=== 1960s ===
Date	Country	Locations visited	Details
February 1960	Indonesia	Jakarta, Bogor	Official visit.
February 1960	India	New Delhi	Official visit.
February 1960	Burma	Rangoon	Official visit.
May 1960	France	Paris	Attended a four-power summit.
2-4 September 1960	Finland	Helsinki	Attended Urho Kekkonen's 60th birthday celebration.
September–October 1960	United States	New York City	Attended the 15th United Nations General Assembly.
June 3–4, 1961	Austria	Vienna	Attended the bruising Vienna Summit.
May 1962	People's Republic of Bulgaria	Sofia Varna	State visit.
August 22, 1963	Yugoslavia	Belgrade Skopje	Toured the areas of Skopje devastated by the 1963 Skopje earthquake.
May 1964	Egypt	Cairo Aswan	Celebrated the completion of the first stage of the Aswan High Dam. Awarded Egyptian President Gamal Abdel Nasser the title of Hero of the Soviet Union.
June 1964	Denmark	Copenhagen	Official visits.
June 1964	Sweden	Stockholm	Official visits.
June 1964	Norway	Oslo	Official visits.

== See also ==
- Peaceful coexistence
- List of Soviet Union–United States summits
- Khrushchev Thaw
- List of international trips made by Mikhail Gorbachev
