= List of international prime ministerial trips made by Vladimir Putin =

This is a list of prime ministerial trips made by Vladimir Putin, during his premiership, from 1999 to 2000 and from 2008 to 2012. He made 17 in total: 12 to Europe, 4 to Asia, and 1 to Oceania. During his presidency, though, he's made almost 400.

== Summary ==
Prime Minister Vladimir Putin's visits by country
Number of visits	Country
1 visit (10)	New Zealand; Moldova; Austria; Italy; Poland; Finland; France; Belgium; Denmark; Sweden
2 visits (2)	China; Turkey
3 visits (1)	Ukraine

== First premiership (1999–2000) ==
=== 1999 ===
Country	Areas visited	Date(s)	Details
New Zealand	Auckland	September 13	Attended the 1999 APEC meeting hosted in New Zealand.

=== 2000 ===
From 31 December 1999 to 7 May 2000, Prime Minister Putin served as Acting President until he officially became president.

== Second premiership (2008–2012) ==
=== 2008 ===
The following are the international trips made by Putin in 2008:

Country	Areas visited	Date(s)	Details	Image
China	Beijing	8 August	Attended the 2008 Summer Olympics opening ceremony.	
Moldova	Chișinău Cricova	14–15 November	Met with President Vladimir Voronin and Prime Minister Zinaida Greceanîi. Meeting of CIS heads of Government.	

=== 2009 ===
Country	Areas visited	Date(s)	Details	Image
Austria	Vienna	24–25 April	Official visit.	
Italy	Rome	25–26 April	Official visit.	
Turkey	Ankara	5 August	Working visit. Putin met with Turkish Prime Minister Recep Tayyip Erdoğan and President Abdullah Gül. Talks focused on bilateral economic relations and energy cooperation, including the South Stream and Blue Stream pipeline projects.	
Poland	Gdańsk	1 September	Working visit. Putin met with Polish Prime Minister Donald Tusk and attended commemorations marking the 70th anniversary of the start of World War II at Westerplatte.	
Ukraine	Kyiv Yalta	19–20 November	Working visit. Putin held talks with Ukrainian Prime Minister Yulia Tymoshenko in Yalta concerning Russian-Ukrainian economic cooperation. He also attended the CIS Council of Heads of Government meeting at the Livadia Palace.	

=== 2010 ===
Country	Areas visited	Date(s)	Details	Image
Finland	Helsinki	February 10	Attended the Baltic Sea Action Summit. Met with President Tarja Halonen and Lithuanian President Dalia Grybauskaitė.	
Turkey	Istanbul	8 June	Working visit. Met with Prime Minister Recep Tayyip Erdoğan and participated in the Conference on Interaction and Confidence-Building Measures in Asia (CICA) summit. Discussions covered Russia–Turkey relations, energy cooperation, trade, and regional issues, including Iran's nuclear program. Putin also met with Azerbaijani President Ilham Aliyev on the sidelines of the conference to discuss bilateral relations and regional issues.	
France	Paris	10–12 June	Official visit.	
Ukraine	Yalta Sevastopol	24 July	Working visit. Attended the 14th International bike show.	

=== 2011 ===
Country	Areas visited	Date(s)	Details	Image
Belgium	Brussels	24–25 February	Official visit. Attended the Russia-EU summit.	
Ukraine	Kyiv	12 April	Working visit. Met with Mykola Azarov.	
Denmark	Copenhagen	26 April	Official visit.	
Sweden	Stockholm	26–27 April	Met with King Carl XVI Gustaf of Sweden and Prime Minister of Sweden Fredrik Reinfeldt.	
China	Beijing	12 October	Official visit.	

== See also ==
- List of international presidential trips made by Vladimir Putin
- List of international presidential trips made by Dmitry Medvedev
- List of international presidential trips made by Boris Yeltsin
- List of international trips made by Mikhail Gorbachev
