= 14th BRICS summit =

2022 international summit hosted by China

2022 BRICS summit 14th BRICS summit
- 23 June 2022 (digital format)
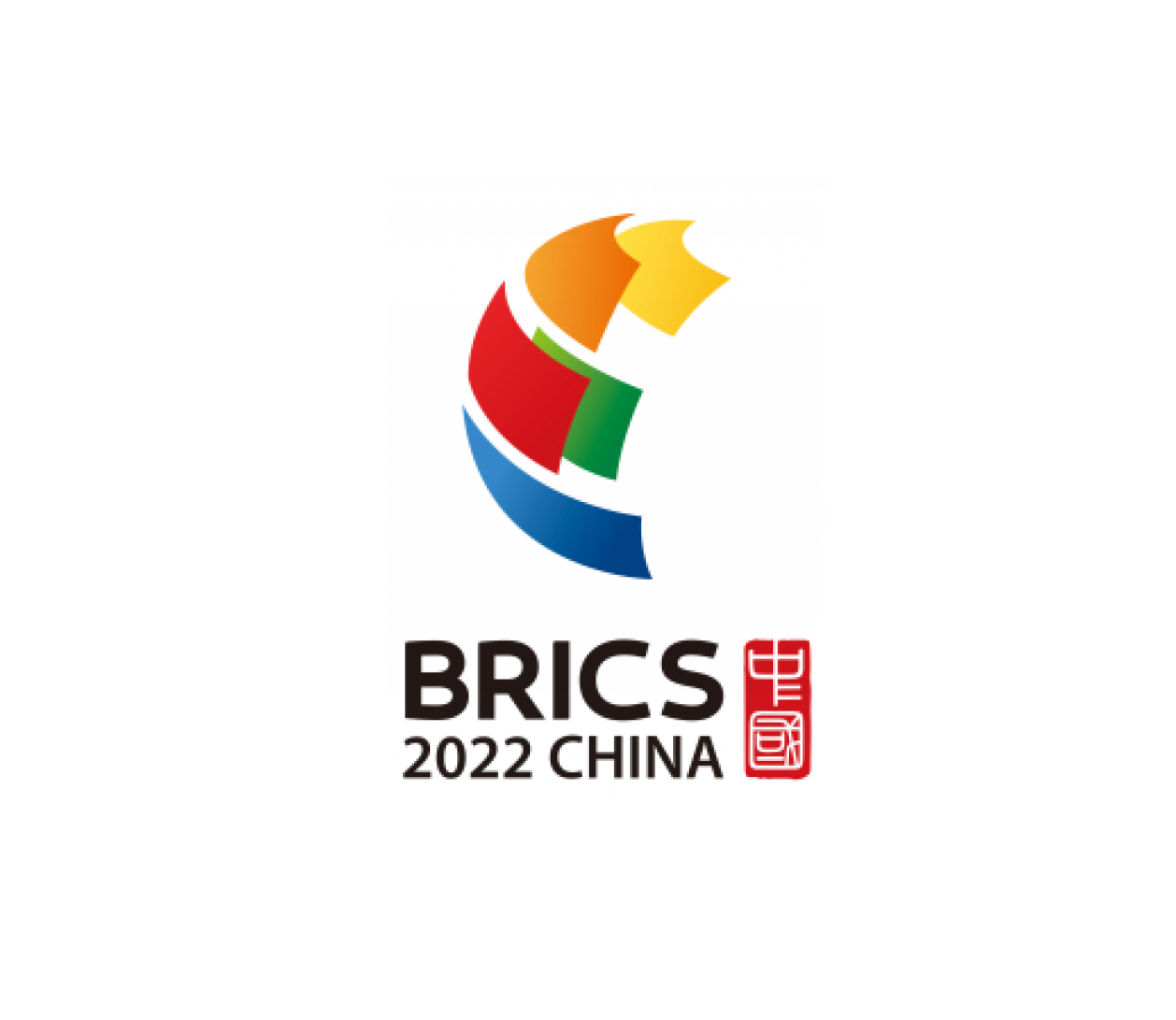
- Host country: China
- Cities: Beijing
- Participants: Brazil; Russia; India; China; South Africa
- Chair: Xi Jinping, CCP General Secretary and President of China
- Website: brics2022.mfa.gov.cn/eng/

The 2022 BRICS summit is the fourteenth annual BRICS summit, an international relations conference attended by the heads of state or heads of government of the five member states Brazil, Russia, India, China and South Africa. It was the third time that China hosted the BRICS Summit after 2011 and 2017. The summit was hosted virtually by video conference.

== Participating leaders ==
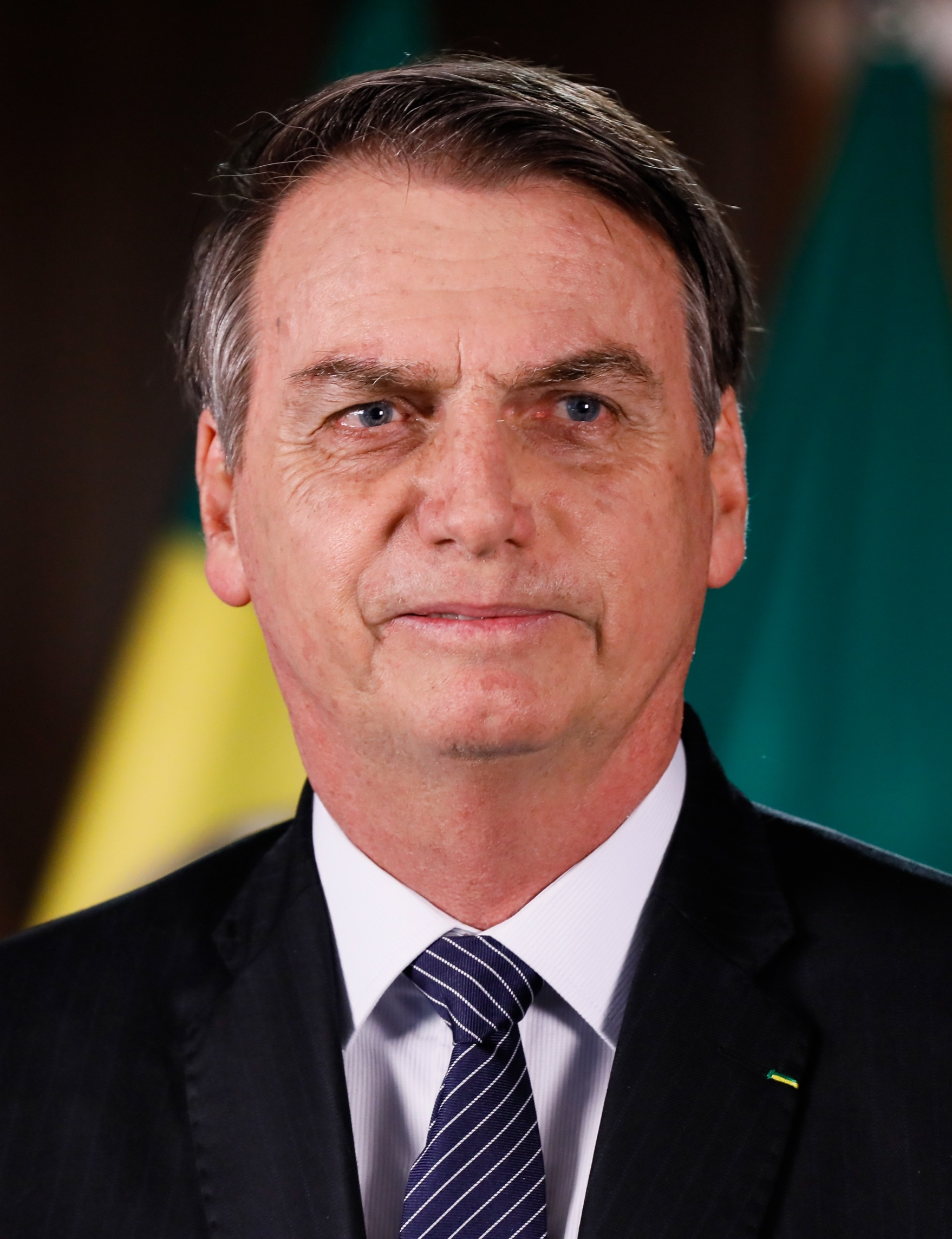
Brazil
Jair Bolsonaro, President

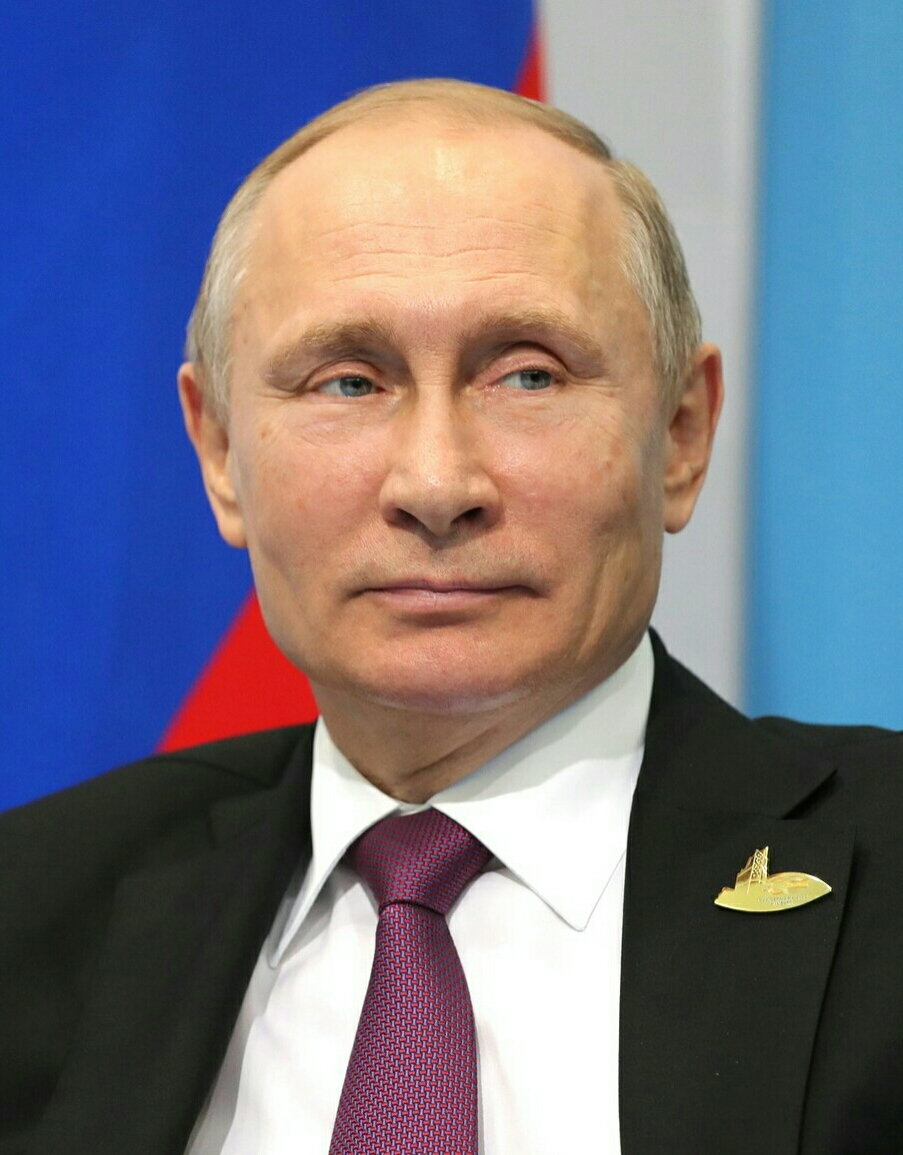
Russia
Vladimir Putin, President

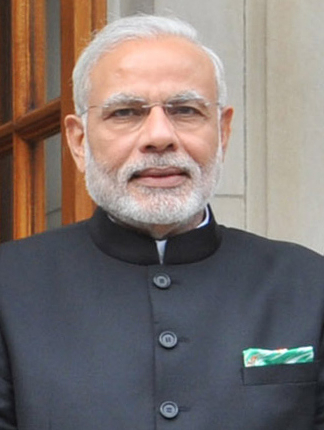
India
Narendra Modi, Prime Minister

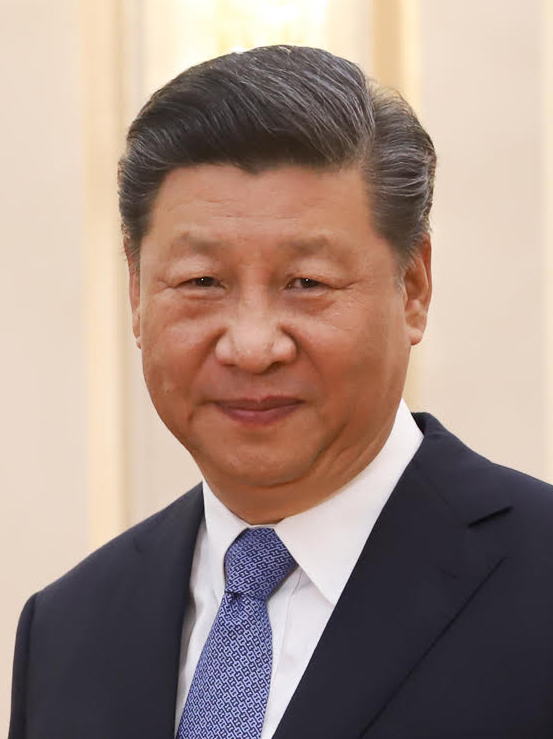
China
Xi Jinping, CCP General Secretary and President (Host)

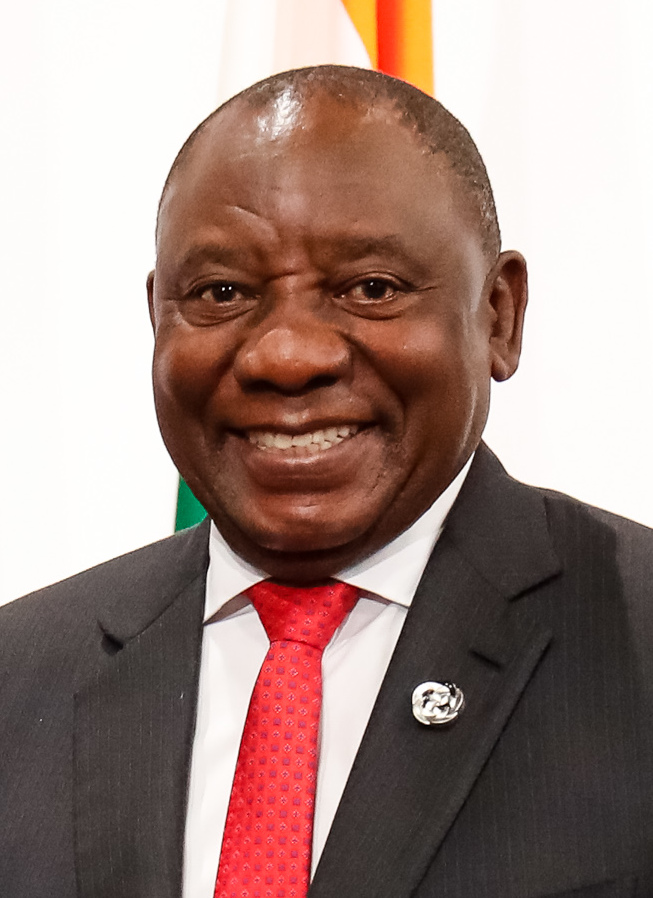
South Africa
Cyril Ramaphosa, President

== Reserve currency ==
A major development on the summit was creation of a new, basket type reserve currency. The currency, combines BRICS currencies and is backed by precious metals.
