= List of international presidential trips made by Dmitry Medvedev =

Foreign visits of the former president Dmitry Medvedev

This is a list of international trips made by Dmitry Medvedev, during his presidency, he made 102 international trips to different countries.

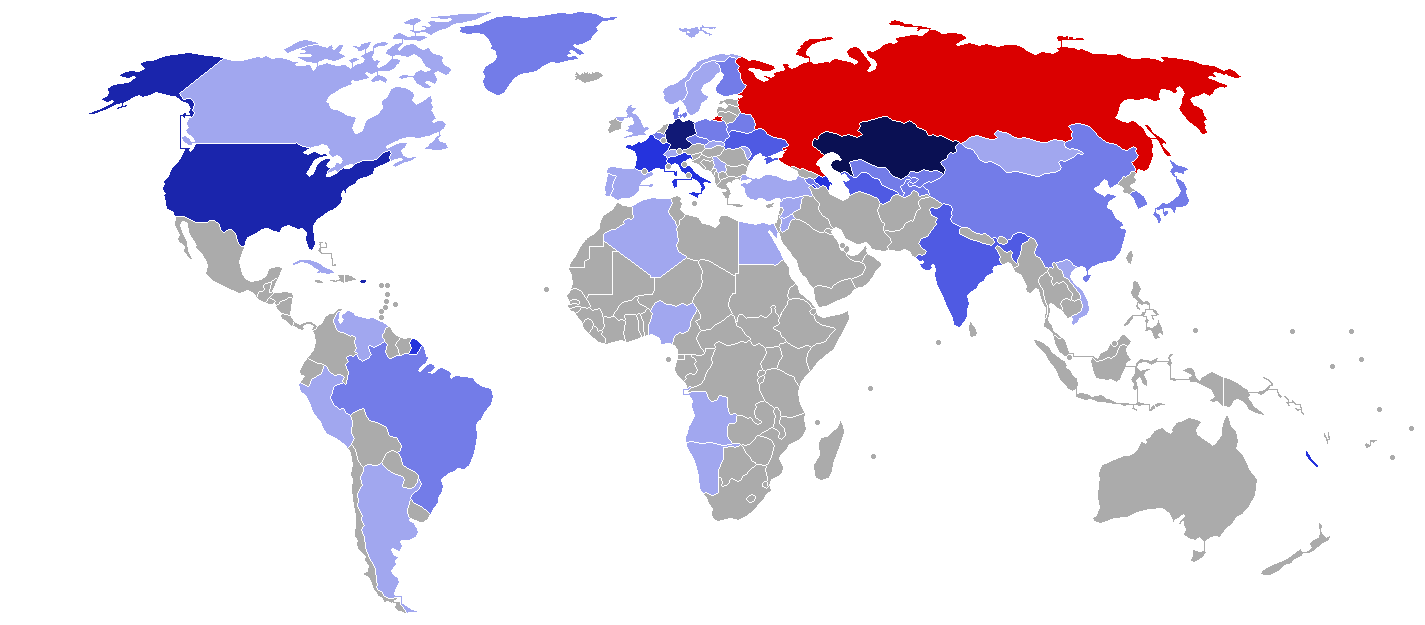
World map highlighting countries visited by Dmitry Medvedev during his presidency. One visit Two visits Three visits Four visits Five visits Seven visits Ten visits Russia

== 2008 ==
Country	Areas visited	Date(s)	Details	Image
Kazakhstan	Astana	22–23 May	Official visit	
China	Beijing	23–25 May	Official visit	
Germany	Berlin	5 June	Official visit	
Belarus	Brest	22 June	Official visit	
Azerbaijan	Baku	3 July	Official visit	
Turkmenistan	Ashgabat	4 July	Official visit	
Kazakhstan	Astana	5–6 July	Official visit and attended the CIS Summit.	
Japan	Tokyo, Hokkaido	7–8 July	Official visit and attended the G8 Summit.	
Tajikistan	Dushanbe	28–29 August	Official visit and attended the SCO Summit.	
Kazakhstan	Aktobe	22 September	Visit	
France	Paris	8 October	Conference of world politics	
Kyrgyzstan	Bishkek	9 October	Official visit and attended the CIS Summit.	
Armenia	Yerevan	10 October	Official visit	
France	Nice	13–14 November	Visit	
United States	Washington, D.C.	15–16 November	Official visit and attended the G20 Summit.	
Peru	Lima	24 November	Official visit and attended the APEC Summit.	
Brazil	Rio de Janeiro	25–26 November	Official visit	
Venezuela	Caracas	27 November	Official visit. Medvedev became the first Russian president to visit Venezuela.	
Cuba	Havana	28 November	Met with Raúl Castro and Fidel Castro	
India	New Delhi	4–5 December	Official visit	
Kazakhstan	Astana	19 December	Visit	

== 2009 ==
Country	Areas visited	Date(s)	Details	Image
Uzbekistan	Tashkent and Samarkand	22–23 January	Official visit	
Italy	Bari	1 March	Official visit	
Spain	Madrid	2–3 March	Official visit. Medvedev was handed the key to Madrid.	
Germany	Berlin	31 March	Visit	
United Kingdom	London	1–2 April	Official visit and attended G20 Summit.	
Finland	Helsinki	20–21 April	State visit	
Netherlands	Amsterdam	19–20 June	Official visit	
Egypt	Cairo	23–24 June	Visit	
Nigeria	Abuja	24 June	Official visit	
Namibia	Windhoek	25–26 June	Official visit	
Angola	Luanda	26 June	Official visit	
Azerbaijan	Baku	29 June	Working visit	
Italy	Rome and L'Aquila	8–10 July	Official visit and attended the G8 Summit.	
South Ossetia	Tskhinvali	13 July	Working visit	
Tajikistan	Dushanbe	30–31 July	Official visit. Met with Asif Ali Zardari, Emomali Rahmon, and Hamid Karzai.	
Kyrgyzstan	Cholpon-Ata	31 July – 1 August	Official visit. Attended the CSTO Summit.	
Mongolia	Ulaanbaatar	25–26 August	Official visit. Attended the celebrations of the 70th anniversary of the Battles of Khalkhin Gol.	
Kazakhstan	Aktau	11–12 September	Working visit. Attended an informal meeting of the Presidents of Russia, Azerbaijan, Kazakhstan and Turkmenistan.	
Turkmenistan	Turkmenbashi	13 September	Attended the Silk Way Rally	
Switzerland	Kehrsatz, Bern, and Andermatt	21–22 September	First visit by Russian leader to the country	
United States	New York City, Pittsburgh	27–28 September	Official visit. Participate in 64th Regular Session of the United Nations General Assembly. Attended the G20 Summit.	
Moldova	Chișinău	8–9 October	Attended the CIS Summit.	
Kazakhstan	Astana	16 October	Attended the final stage of the "Cooperation 2009" military exercises conducted by the Collective Rapid Reaction Force of the CSTO at the Maribulak military training field of the final phase of the exercises.	
Serbia	Belgrade	21 October	Official visit. 65th anniversary of the liberation of Belgrade.	
Germany	Berlin	9 November	Attended the celebrations in honor of the 20th anniversary of the fall of the Berlin Wall.	
Singapore	Singapore	15–16 November	Official visit and attended the APEC Summit.	
Sweden	Stockholm	18 November	Working visit	
Belarus	Minsk	27 November	Working visit	
Italy	Rome	3 December	Working visit	
Vatican City State	Vatican City	3 December	Working visit	
Denmark	Copenhagen	18 December	Attended the UN Summit on Global Climate Change	
Kazakhstan	Almaty	19 December	Working visit	
Turkmenistan	Ashgabat	22 December	Working visit	

== 2010 ==
Country	Areas visited	Date(s)	Details	Image
France	Paris	1–2 March	Visit	
Slovakia	Bratislava	6–7 April	Visit	
Czech Republic	Prague	7–8 April	Attended the signing of the Russian-American Treaty on the reduction and limitation of strategic offensive arms	
United States	Washington, D.C.	13–14 April	Attended the Nuclear Security Summit.	
Argentina	Buenos Aires	15–16 April	Visit	
Brazil	Brasília	16–18 April	Visit. Attended the BRIC Summit.	
Poland	Kraków	18–21 April	Visit	
Ukraine	Kharkiv	21–26 April	Visit	
Norway	Oslo	26–27 April	Visit	
Denmark	Copenhagen	27–28 April	Visit	
Syria	Damascus	10–11 May	Visit	
Turkey	Ankara	12 May	Visit	
Ukraine	Kyiv	18 May	Visit	
Germany	Berlin	5 June	Visit	
Uzbekistan	Tashkent	10–11 June	Attended the SCO Summit.	
United States	Washington, D.C. and San Francisco	23–25 June	Met with the Governor of California Arnold Schwarzenegger. He also visited Stanford University. Met with Barack Obama.	
Canada	Huntsville and Toronto	25–27 June	Attended the G8 and G20 Summits	
Kazakhstan	Astana	5 July	Working visit	
Finland	Helsinki	21 July	Working visit	
Italy	Milan	23 July	Official visit	
Abkhazia	Sukhumi and Gudauta	8 August	Working visit	
Armenia	Yerevan	20 August	Official visit. Attended the CSTO Summit.	
Azerbaijan	Baku	2–3 September	Official visit	
Kazakhstan	Astana	7 September	Working visit	
China	Beijing	26–28 September	Official visit	
Algeria	Algiers	6 October	Official visit	
Cyprus	Nicosia	7 October	Official visit	
France	Deauville	18–19 October	Visit	
Vietnam	Hanoi	30–31 October	Working visit. Attended the ASEAN summit.	
South Korea	Seoul	10–12 November	Attended the G20 Summit	
Japan	Yokohama	10–12 November	Attended the APEC Summit.	
Azerbaijan	Baku	18 November	Working visit. Attended the Third Caspian Summit.	
Portugal	Lisbon	30 November	Attended the Russia-NATO Summit	
Kazakhstan	Astana	1 December	Working visit	
Poland	Warsaw	6 December	Working visit	
Belgium	Brussels	7–8 December	Attended the Russia-EU summit	
India	New Delhi	20–21 December	Working visit	

== 2011 ==
Country	Areas visited	Date(s)	Details	Image
State of Palestine	Jericho	18 January	Official visit	
Jordan	Amman	19 January	Official visit	
China	Hong Kong	13–17 April	Attended the BRICS Summit.	
France	Deauville	26–27 May	Attended the G8 Summit.	
Italy	Rome	1–2 June	Working visit	
Uzbekistan	Tashkent	14 June	Working visit	
Kazakhstan	Astana	14—15 June	Working visit. Attended the SCO Summit.	
Germany	Hanover	18–19 July	Visit	
Kazakhstan	Astana	12 August	Working visit. Attended the CSTO Summit.	
Tajikistan	Dushanbe	2—3 September	Official visit. Attended the CIS Summit.	
Ukraine	Donetsk	18 October	Working visit	
France	Cannes	3–4 November	Attended the G20 Summit.	
Germany	Berlin	7–8 November	Official visit	
United States	Honolulu	15–16 November	Attended the APEC Summit.	
Czech Republic	Prague	7–8 December	Visit	
Belgium	Brussels	15 December	Attended the Russia-EU summit	

== 2012 ==
Country	Areas visited	Date(s)	Details	Image
South Korea	Seoul	26–27 March	Attended the Nuclear Security Summit.	
India	New Delhi	28–30 March	Attended the BRICS Summit.	

== See also ==
- List of international presidential trips made by Vladimir Putin
- List of international presidential trips made by Boris Yeltsin
- List of international trips made by Mikhail Gorbachev
