= 9th BRICS summit =

2017 international summit in Xiamen, China

2017 BRICS summit 9th BRICS summit
- 3–5 September 2017
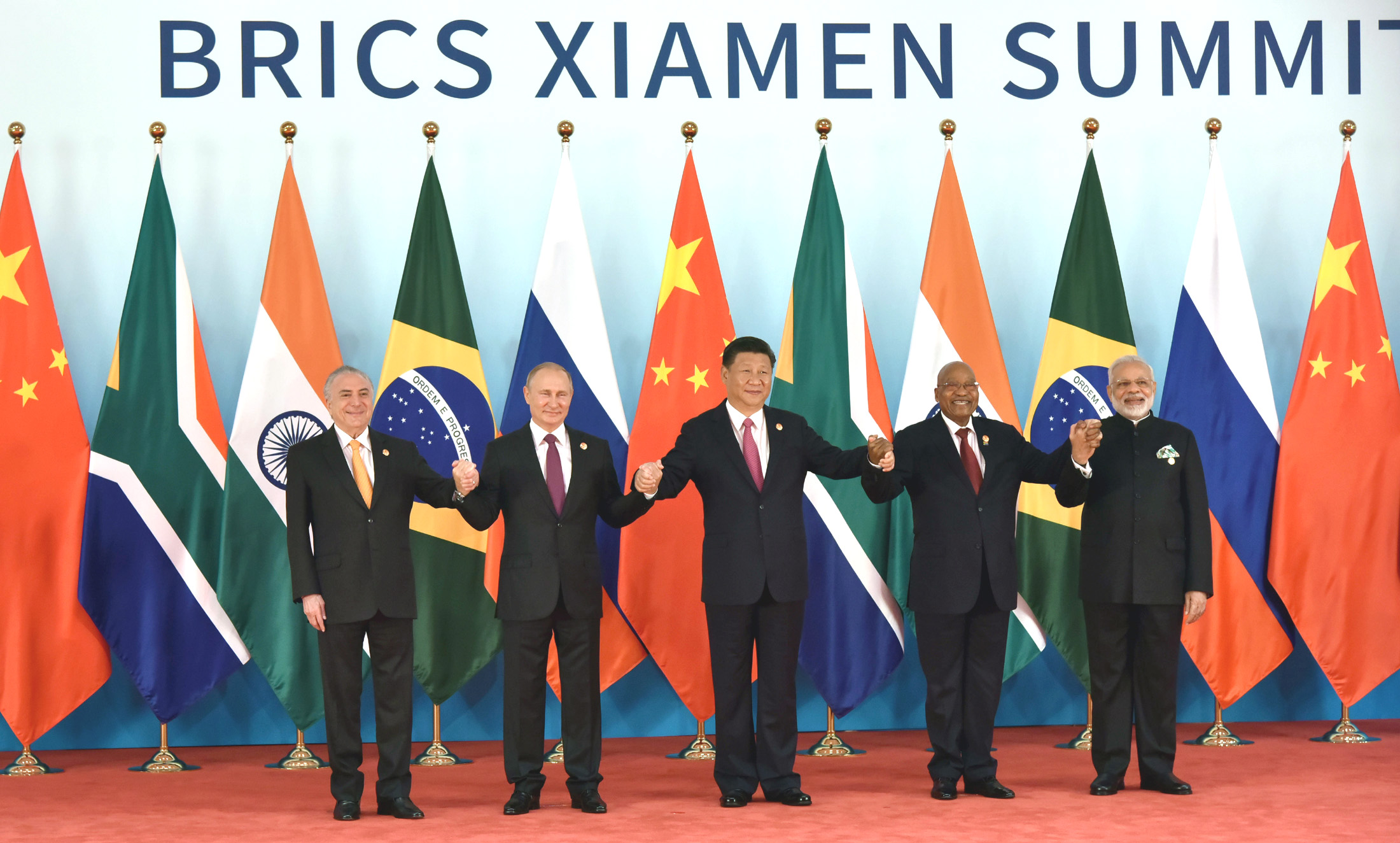
- Host country: China
- Motto: BRICS: Stronger Partnership for a Brighter Future.
- Cities: Xiamen
- Venues: Xiamen International Conference Center
- Participants: Brazil; Russia; India; China; South Africa
- Chair: Xi Jinping, CCP General Secretary and President of China

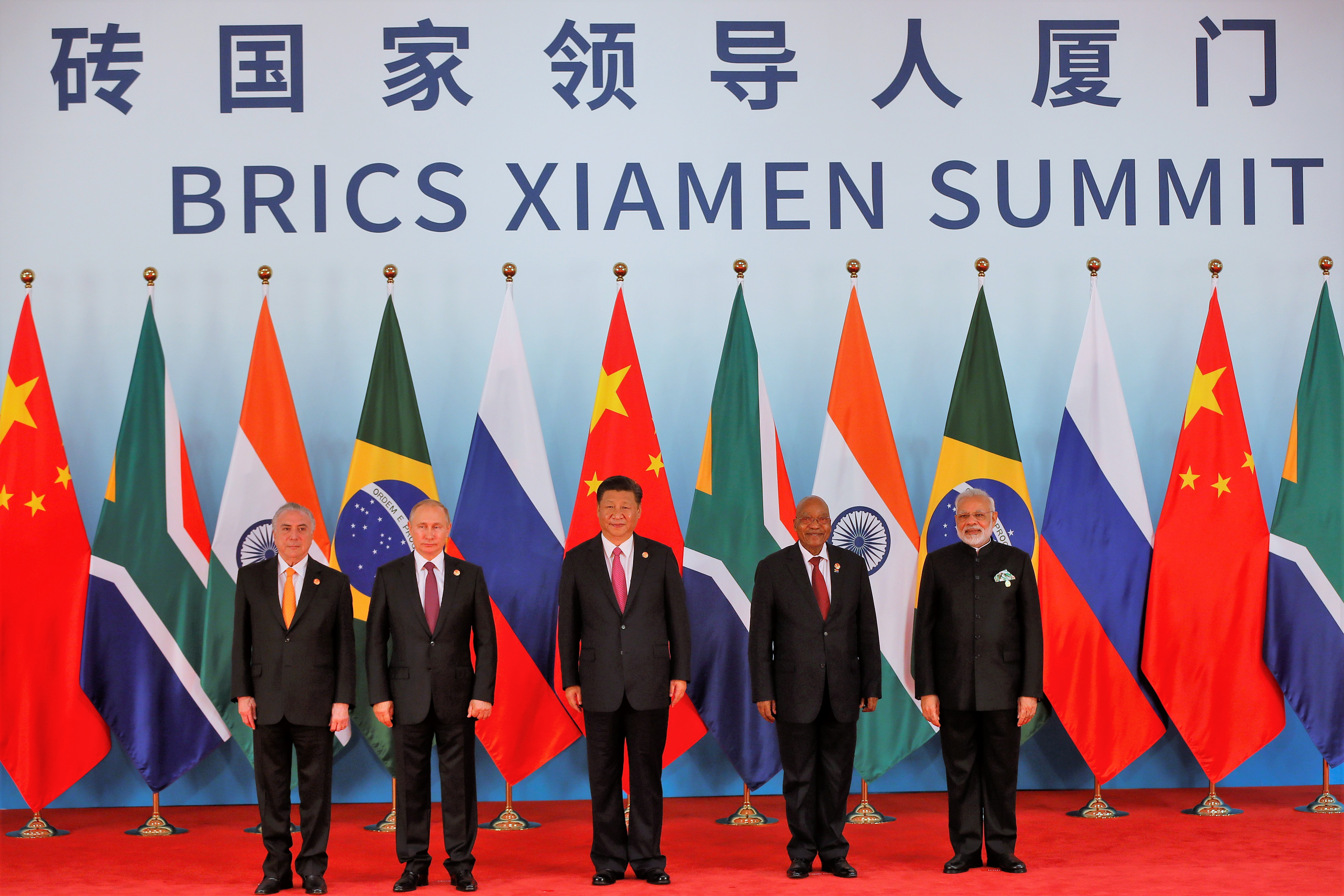
Group photo of BRICS leaders.

The 2017 BRICS summit was the ninth annual BRICS summit, an international relations conference attended by the heads of state or heads of government of the five member states Brazil, Russia, India, China and South Africa. The summit was held in Xiamen, China, the second time the China has hosted the summit after the 2011 summit.

== Participants ==
**BRICS members** Host state and leader are shown in bold text.
Member		Represented by	Title
(Brazil)	Brazil	Michel Temer	President
(Russia)	Russia	Vladimir Putin	President
(India)	India	Narendra Modi	Prime Minister
(China)	China	Xi Jinping	General Secretary; President
(South Africa)	South Africa	Jacob Zuma	President
**Guest Invitees (Countries)**
Member		Represented by	Title
(Egypt)	Egypt	Abdel Fattah Al-Sisi	President
(Guinea)	Guinea	Alpha Condé	President
(Mexico)	Mexico	Enrique Peña Nieto	President
(Tajikistan)	Tajikistan	Emomali Rahmon	President
(Thailand)	Thailand	Prayuth Chan-ocha	Prime Minister

== Participating leaders ==
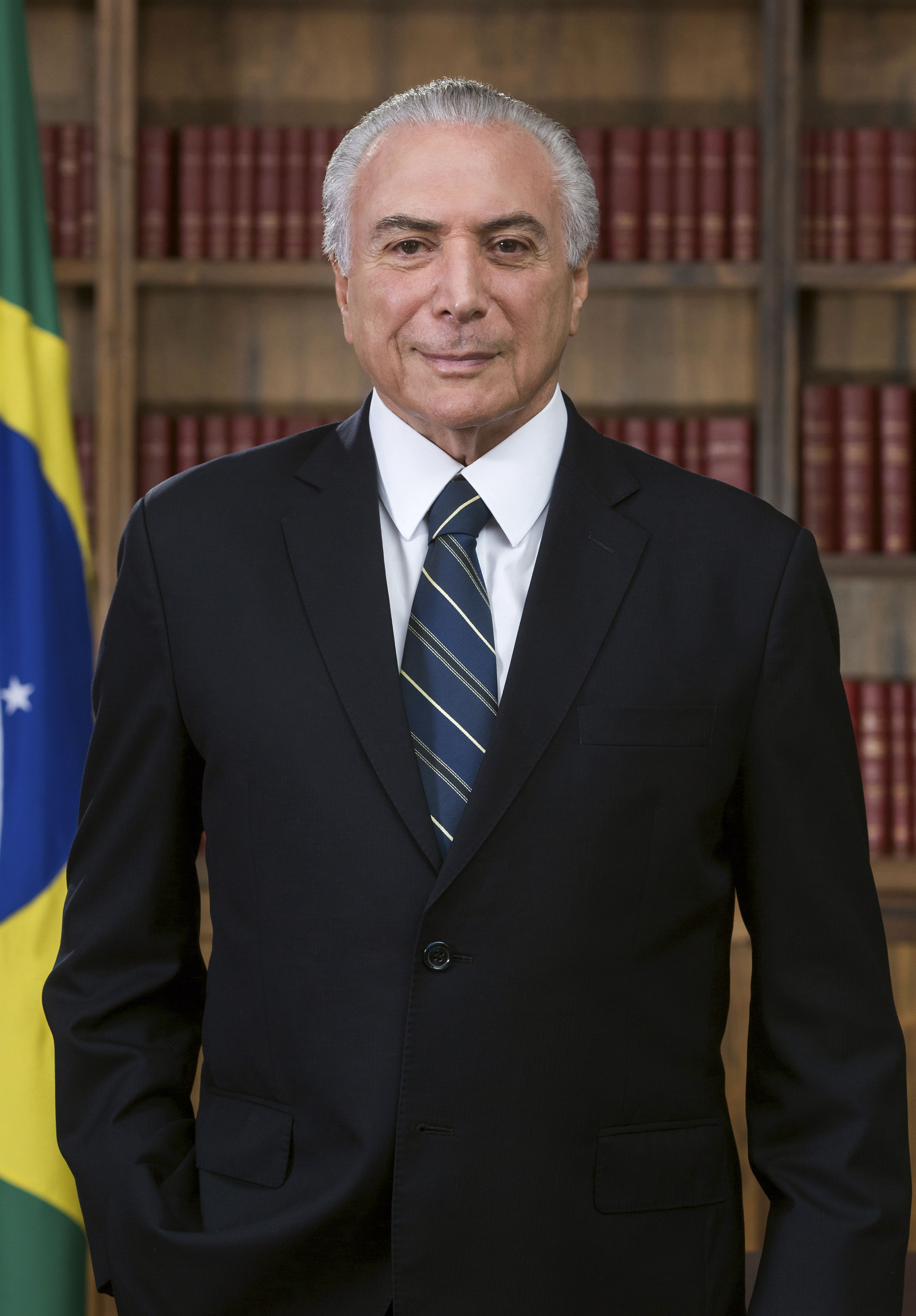
**Brazil**
Michel Temer, President

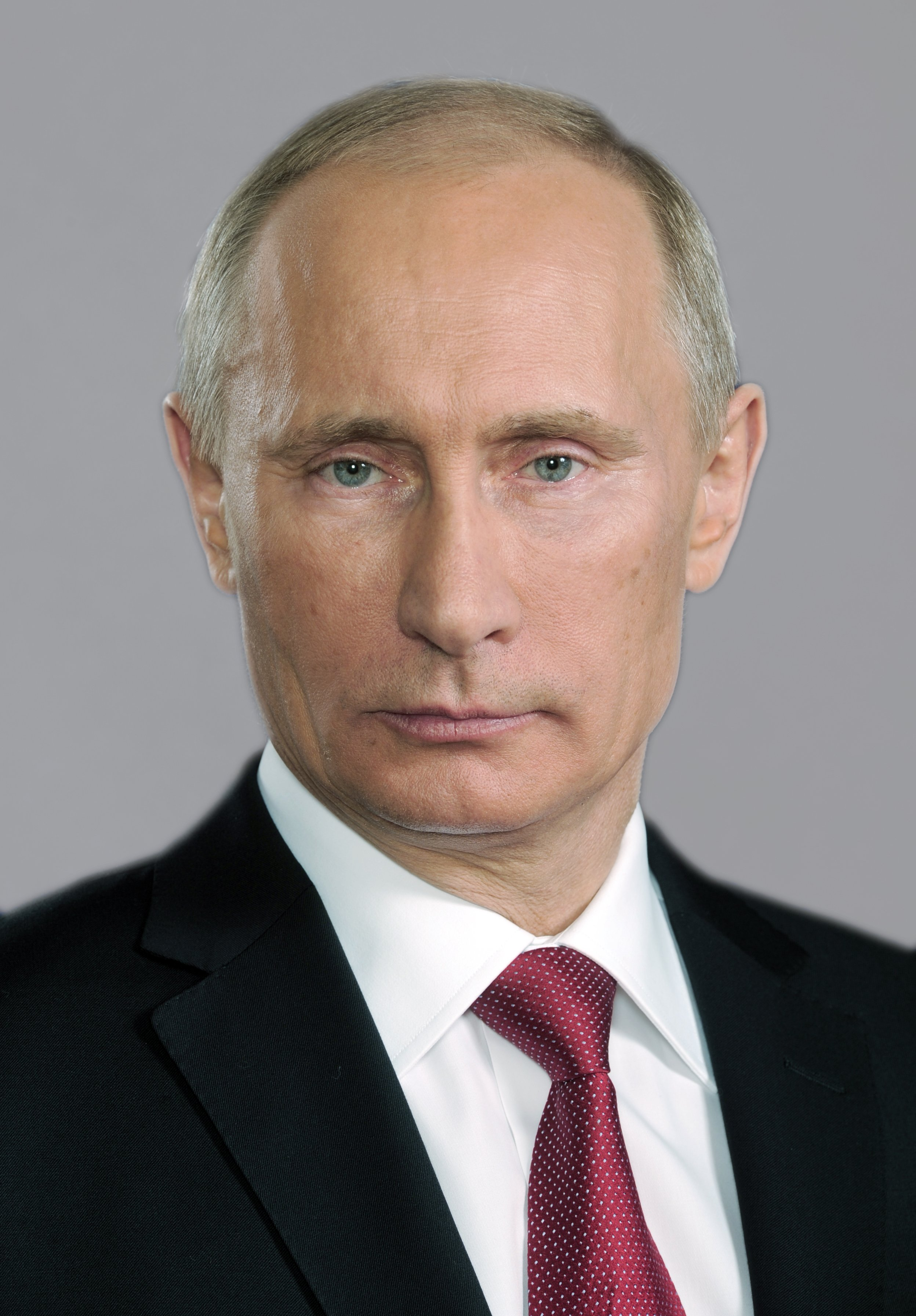
**Russia**
Vladimir Putin, President

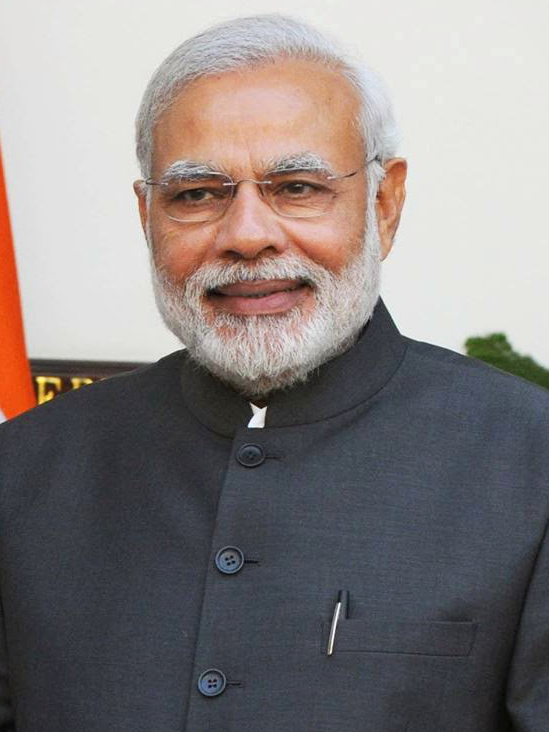
**India**
Narendra Modi, Prime Minister

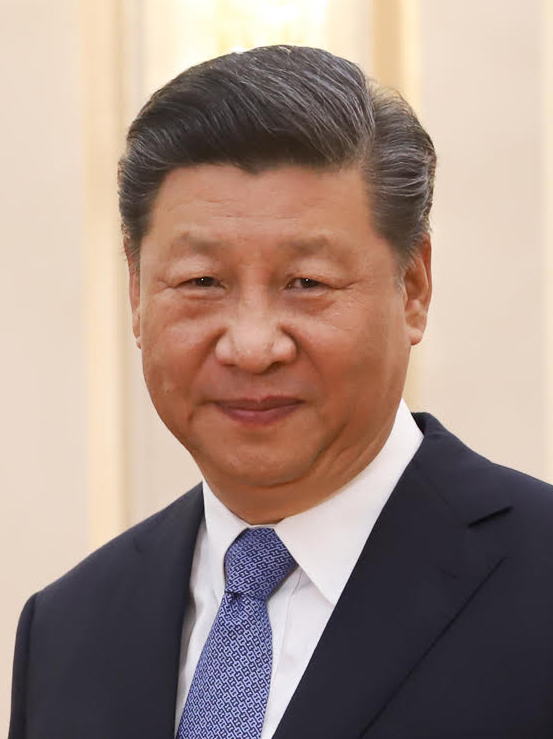
**China**
**Xi Jinping, CCP General Secretary and President (Host)**

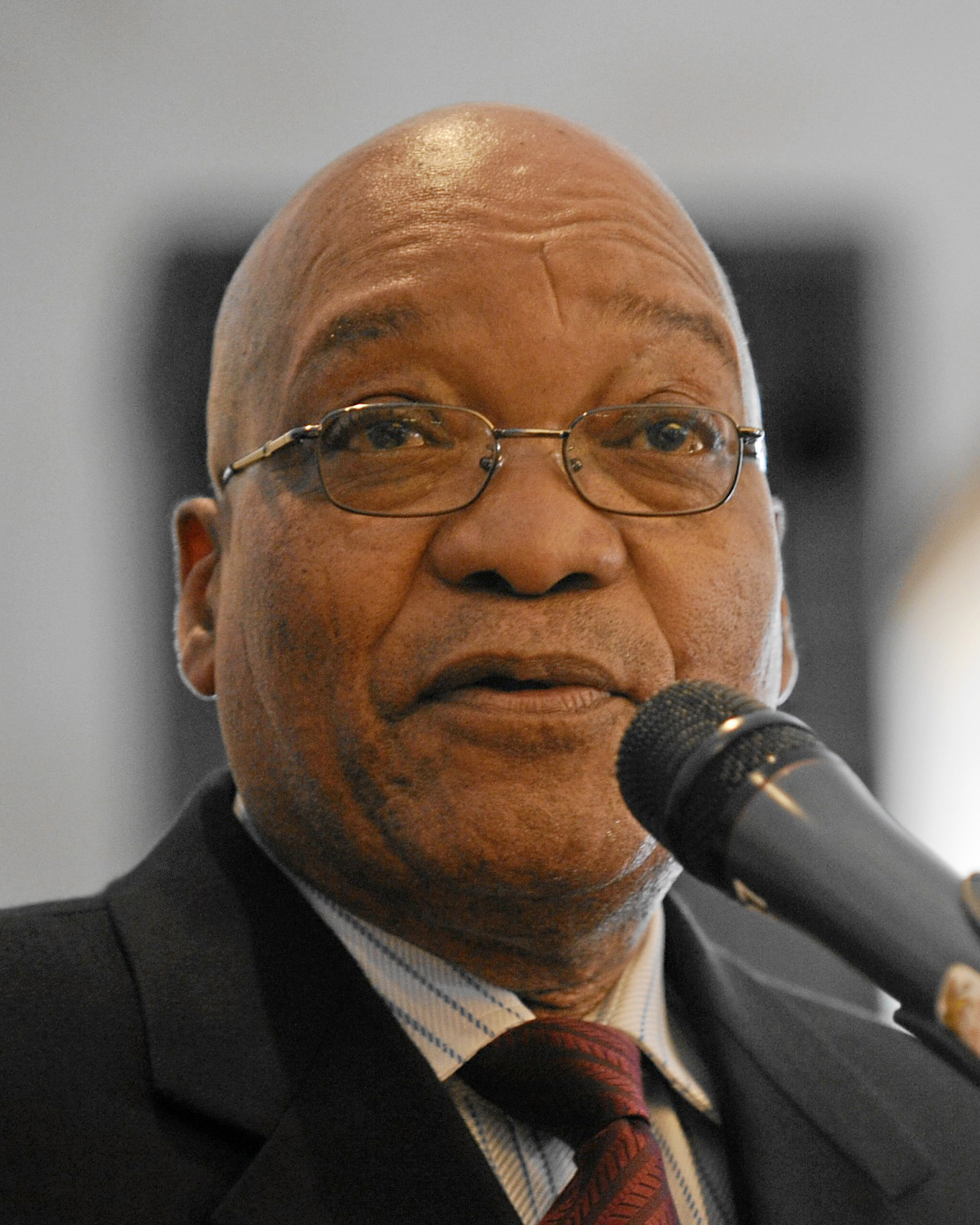
**South Africa**
Jacob Zuma, President
