= Caspian Summit =

Series of diplomatic meetings (2002–2022)

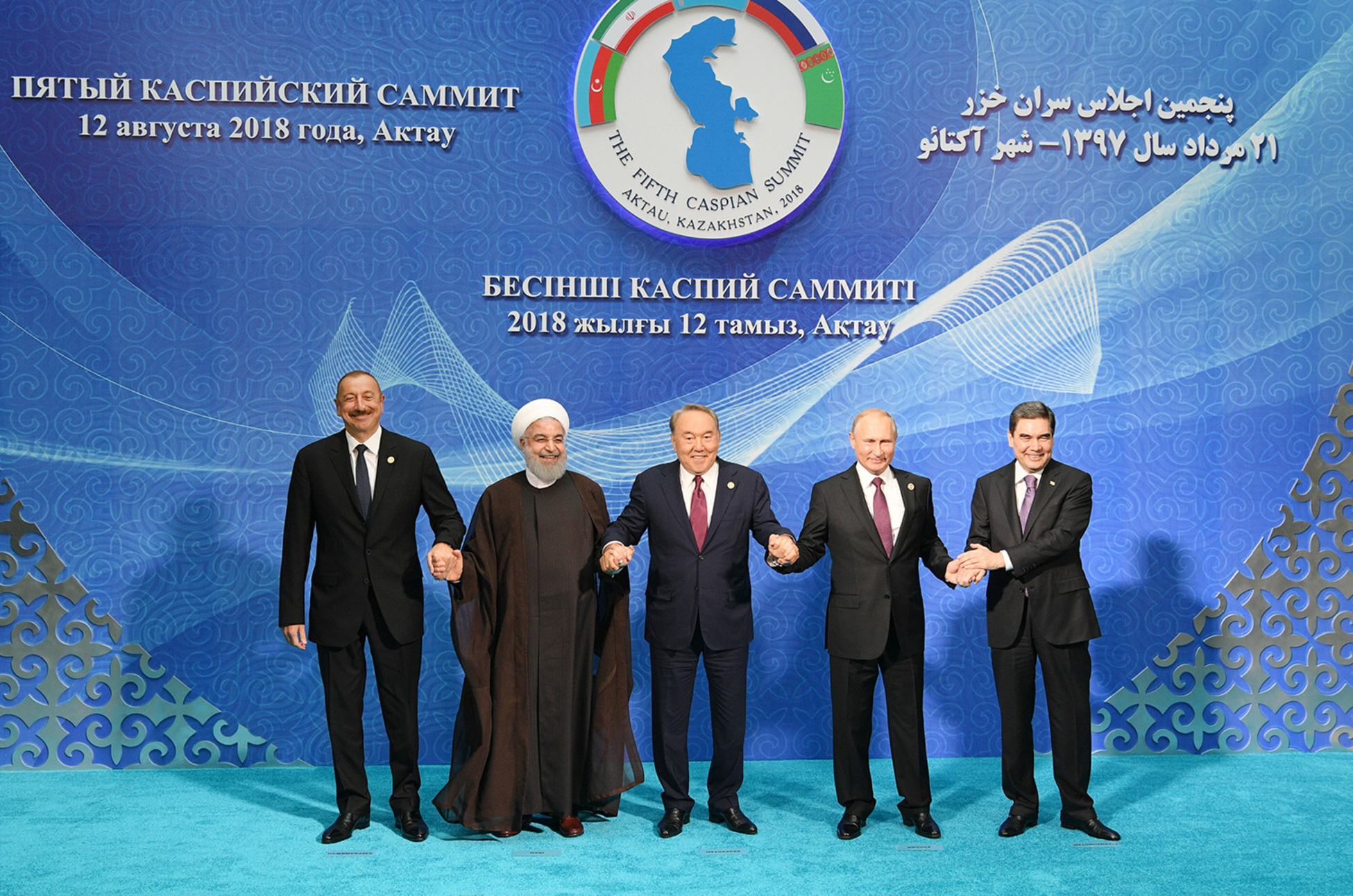
Heads of State of Caspian littoral states made press statements at Aktau Summit, 12 August 2018

In the Soviet period, the Caspian Sea was practically an inland water basin within the Soviet Union's borders and washed off the coast of Iran only to the south. Until 1992, the status of the Caspian was regulated by the Soviet-Iranian treaties. After the collapse of the USSR, the emergence of the independent states of Azerbaijan, Kazakhstan and Turkmenistan raised the issue of dividing the Caspian Sea.

Although meetings with the representatives of the coastal states on how to settle the status of the Caspian Sea aimed to make a final decision, this was not possible, and there was a need to discuss the issue at the Summit. During these talks, the meeting held in Ashgabat on April 22–23, 2002 was of historical importance. The summit drew attention to 2 main aspects: 1) for the first time, the Caspian littoral states discussed the issues related to the Caspian Sea as a whole, and 2) for the first time, the Ashgabat summit included a search for a compromise between the heads of all coastal states on the status of the Caspian.

== I Caspian Summit ==
On April 23–24, 2002, the first summit of the Caspian states was held in Ashgabat, Turkmenistan.

The Summit of the heads of Caspian littoral states with the participation of Presidents Heydar Aliyev (Azerbaijan), Saparmurat Niyazov (Turkmenistan), Mohammad Khatami (Iran), Nursultan Nazarbayev (Kazakhstan) and Vladimir Putin (Russia) was the first summit. At the closed meeting Russia, Azerbaijan, and Kazakhstan defended the sharing of offshore fields along the middle line and the shared use of the sea surface. On the other hand, Turkmenistan has created differences of opinion by supporting the argument of the division of the Caspian Sea. At the same time, the President of Turkmenistan reiterated that no one should use force in the Caspian Sea, incite conflicts or disputes, and all disputes should be resolved through negotiations. At this Summit, the heads of Caspian littoral states expressed their views on the legal status of the Caspian Sea for the first time.

== II Caspian Summit ==
The second summit of the Caspian littoral states was held in Tehran on October 16, 2007. At the end of the Summit a Declaration was signed by the heads of the Caspian littoral states. The Declaration consisted of 25 items.

The Declaration recorded that geopolitical and national developments and processes in the Caspian region" should be taken into account by Caspian littoral states. At the same time, the existing agreements between the five states and, therefore, the need to improve the legal regime of the Caspian Sea and to adopt the "Convention on the Legal Status of the Caspian Sea." was recorded.

== III Caspian Summit ==
The 3rd Caspian Summit was held on November 18, 2010, in Baku. The heads of Caspian littoral states signed an agreement on the cooperation on the security in the Caspian Sea. The document included the norms and principles of international law, independence, sovereignty, territorial integrity, inviolability of borders, non-use of force. Article 1 of the agreement states that the security of the Caspian Sea is the exclusive right of the littoral states.

== IV Caspian Summit ==
On September 29, 2014, the forth Caspian Summit was held in Astrakhan. The Caspian littoral states discussed the legal status, security, biological resources and environmental problems of the Caspian Sea.

At the end of the summit, presidents signed agreements covering the cooperation in the field of hydro-meteorology of the Caspian Sea, and on prevention and elimination of consequences of the Caspian Sea, protection and rational use of the Caspian Sea water resources.

== V Caspian Summit ==
The 5th Caspian Summit was held in Aktau in 2018. At this summit the parties signed a Convention on the Legal Status of the Caspian Sea.

The document states that the waters of the Caspian littoral countries are 15 miles. The surface water is universal. However, most of the bio-resources of the Caspian Sea remain in common use.

The presidents signed 8 documents including the Convention on the Legal Status of the Caspian Sea, the Protocol on Cooperation in Combating Terrorism in the Caspian Sea and other documents. These documents include cooperation on the fight against organized crime, economics and trade, transport, resolution of the conflicts, and border agencies.

== VI Caspian Summit ==
The 6th Caspian Summit was held in Ashgabat on June 29, 2022. The presidents of Russia, Azerbaijan, Iran, Kazakhstan and Turkmenistan discussed topical issues of cooperation in the Caspian Sea in relation to various spheres, as well as the implementation of resolutions made during the previous meetings of the heads of the Caspian “five”.

== See also ==
- Caspian Sea
- Convention on the legal status of the Caspian Sea
