= List of international trips made by Mikhail Gorbachev =

This is a list of international trips made by Mikhail Gorbachev as the eighth and last leader of the Soviet Union. In this role he was General Secretary of the Communist Party from 1985 until 1991 as well as Chairman of the Presidium of the Supreme Soviet from 1988 to 1989 and President of the Soviet Union from 1990 to 1991.

== Summary of visits ==
List of international trips made by Mikhail Gorbachev One visit Two visits Three visits Four visits Soviet Union

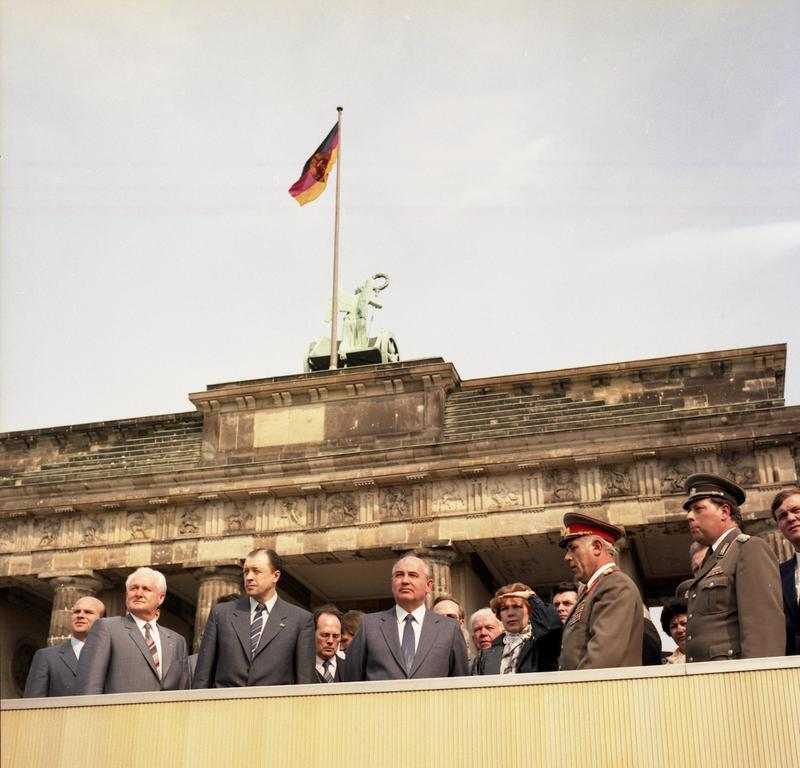
Gorbachev at the Brandenburg Gate in April 1986

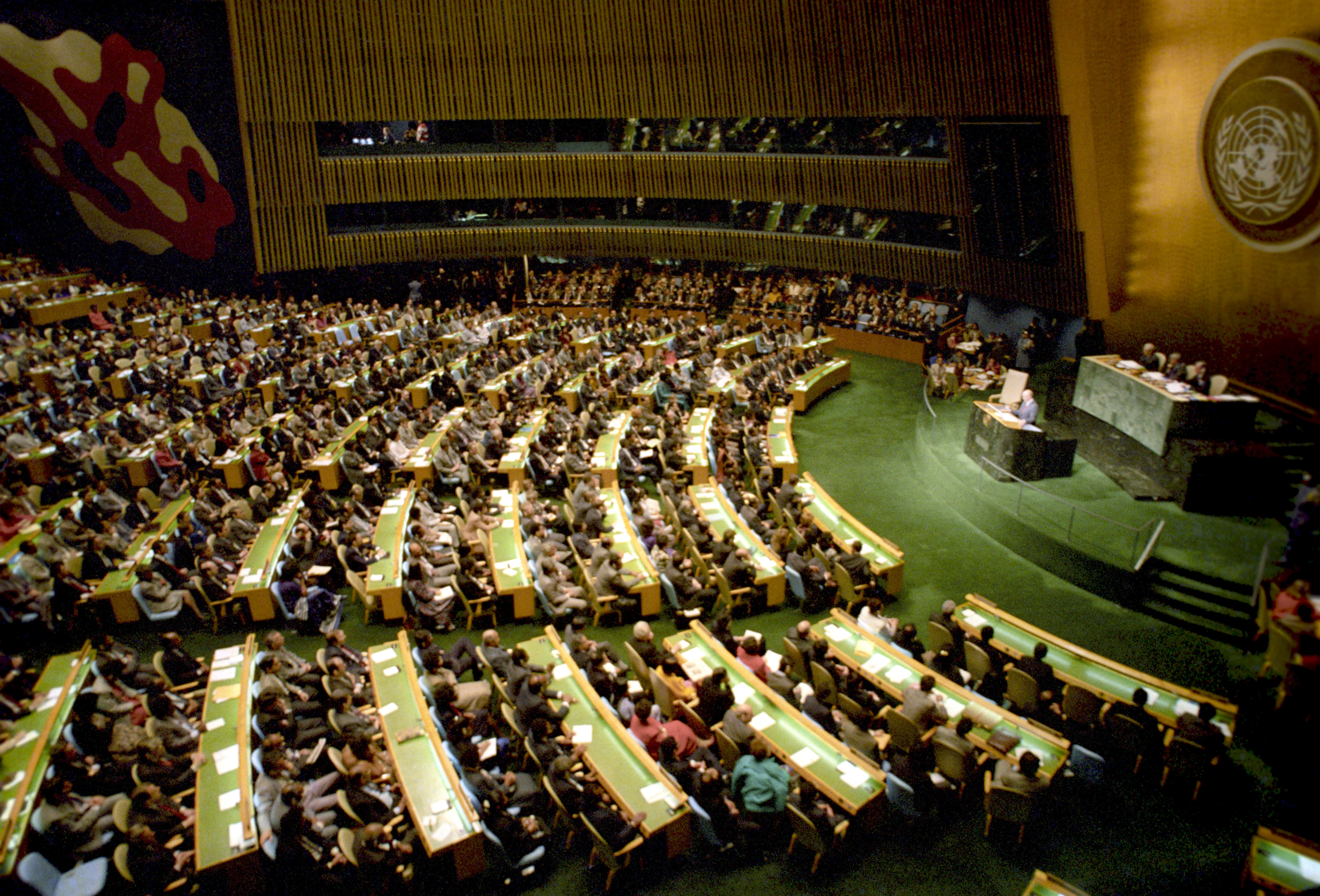
Gorbachev addressing UN General Assembly session, 1988

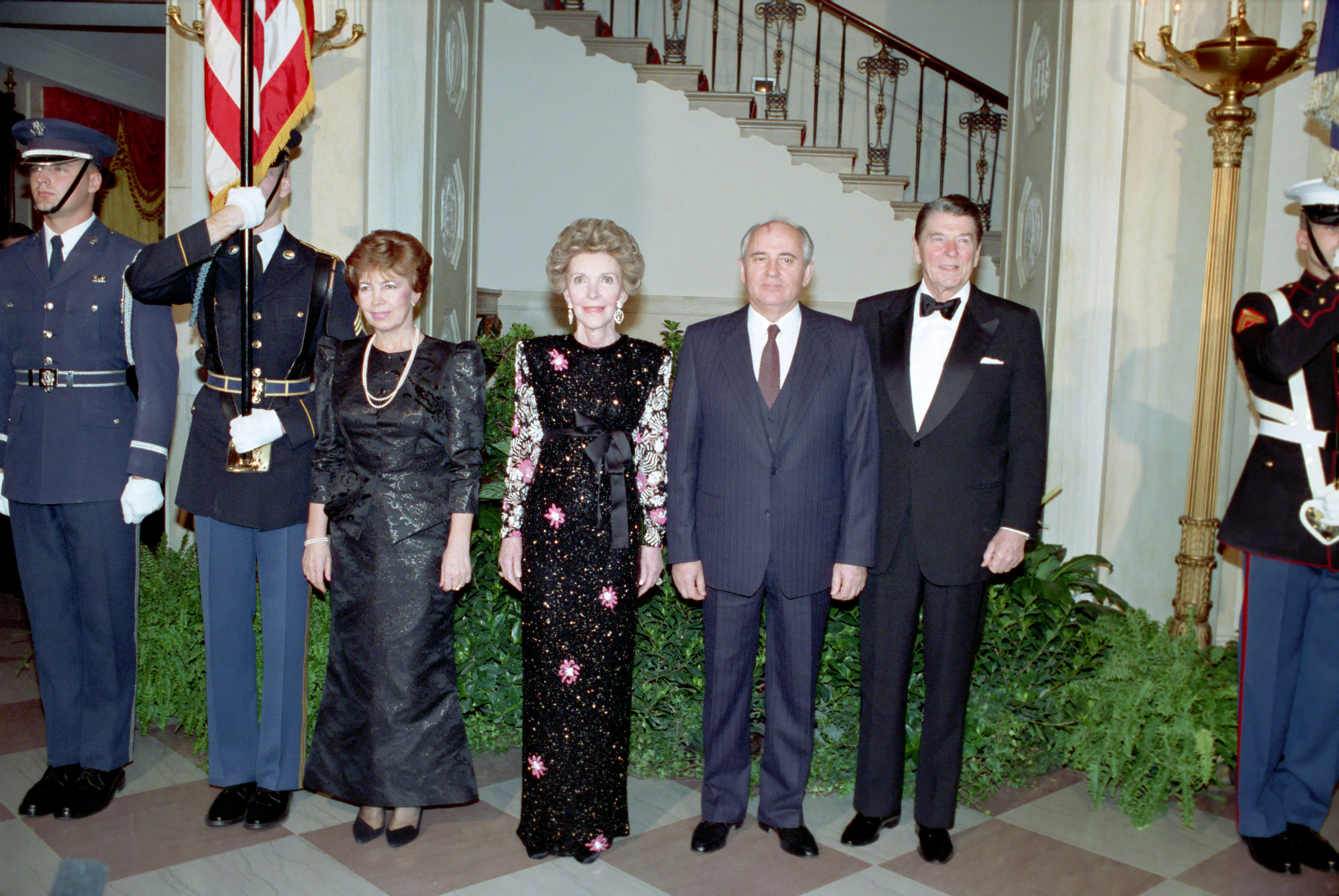
Ronald and Nancy Reagan, as well as the Gorbachevs in the Cross Hall of the White House before a state dinner, 8 December 1987

This is a list of international trips made by Mikhail Gorbachev as the eighth and last leader of the Soviet Union. In this role he was General Secretary of the Communist Party from 1985 until 1991 as well as Chairman of the Presidium of the Supreme Soviet from 1988 to 1989 and President of the Soviet Union from 1990 to 1991.

=== 1985 ===
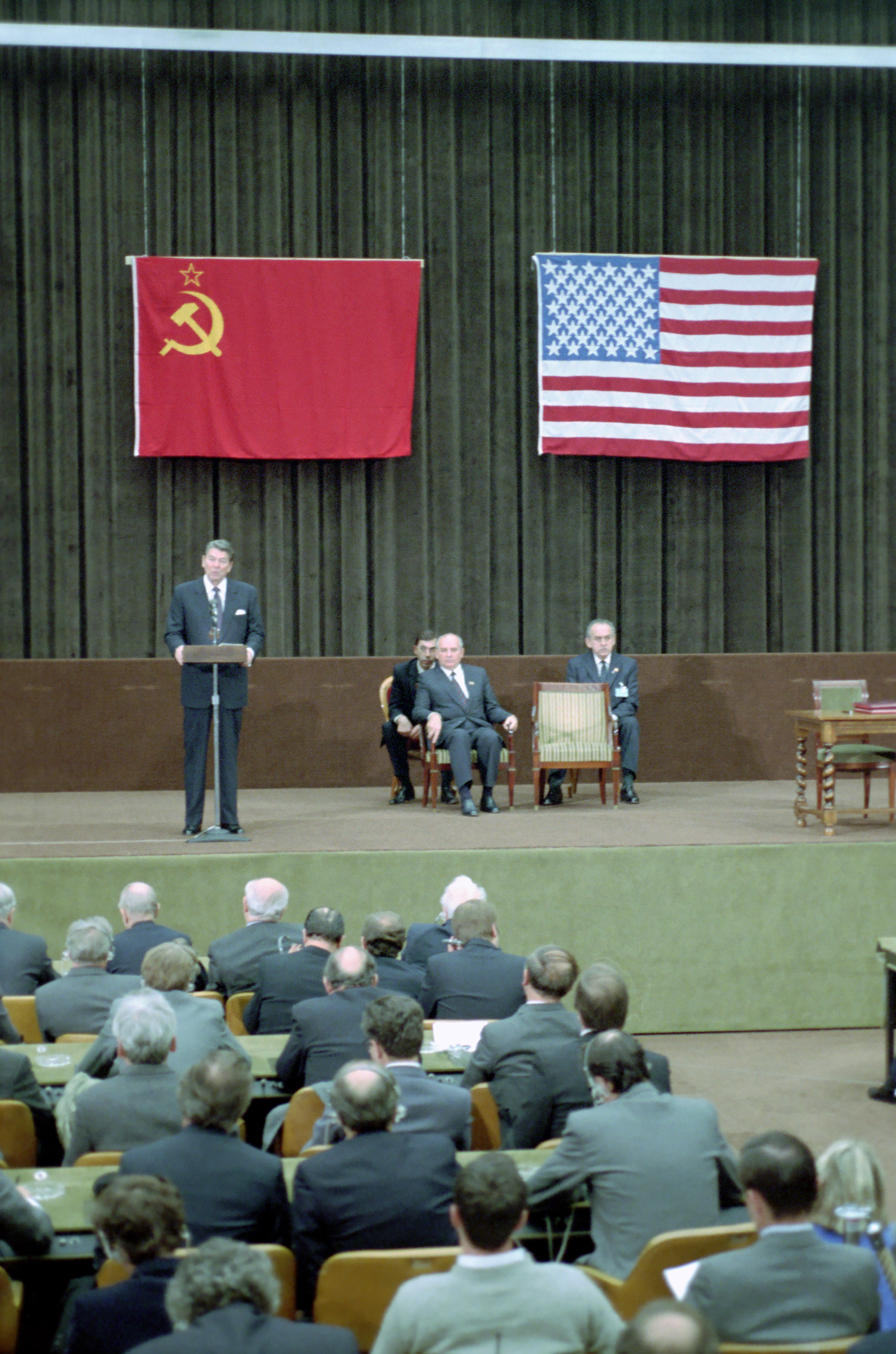
The closing joint-press conference of the Geneva Summit, 21 November 1985

The following are the international trips made by Gorbachev in 1985:

Country	Areas visited	Date(s)	Details
France	Paris	2–5 October	Met with President François Mitterrand.
Netherlands	The Hague	2 November	
Switzerland	Geneva	19–21 November	See Geneva Summit (1985)
Bulgaria	Sofia	8 December	Warsaw Pact summit

=== 1986 ===
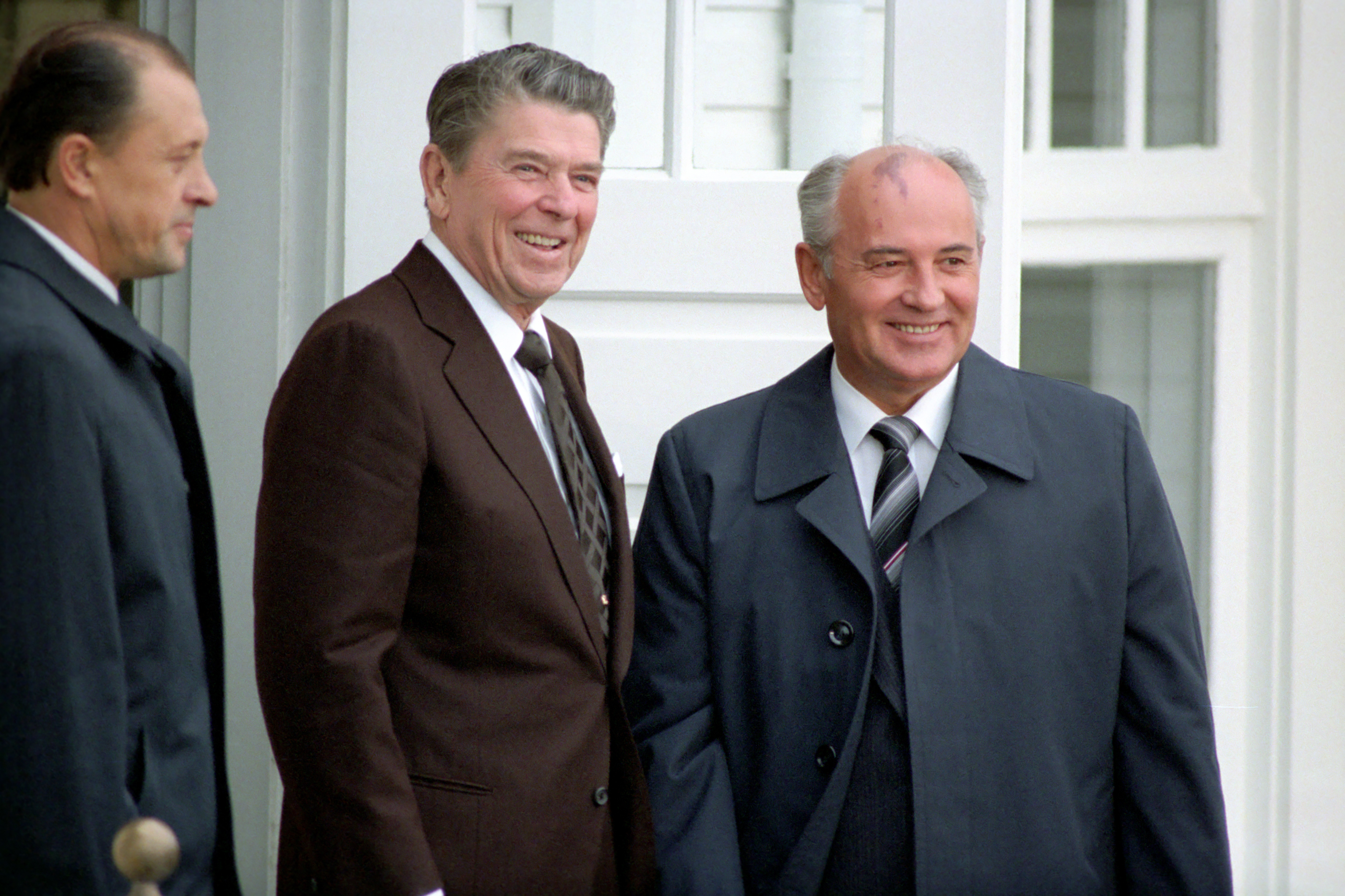
President Reagan and Gorbachev outside Höfði in Reykjavík

The following are the international trips made by Gorbachev in 1986:

Country	Areas visited	Date(s)	Details
East Germany	East Berlin	17–21 April	11th Congress of the Socialist Unity Party of Germany
Hungary	Budapest	8-12 June	State visit and Warsaw Pact summit.
Poland	Warsaw	29 June – 3 July	State visit
Iceland	Reykjavík	11–12 October	See Reykjavík Summit
Austria	Vienna	October	Working visit
India	New Delhi	25–28 November	State visit. Gorbachev met with Prime Minister Rajiv Gandhi and discussed nuclear disarmament, international security, and Indo-Soviet relations.

=== 1987 ===
The following are the international trips made by Gorbachev in 1987:

Country	Cities visited	Date(s)	Details
Czechoslovakia	Prague; Bratislava	9–12 April	State visit. It was postponed for four days due to Gorbachev having a "cold". This also caused him to end his trip a day early so he could get some rest before meeting with Secretary James Baker of the US the following week.
France	Paris	May	State visit
Romania	Bucharest	25–28 May	
United Kingdom	RAF Brize Norton, Oxfordshire	7 December	En route to Washington, D.C.
United States	Washington, D.C.	7–10 December	Signing of the Intermediate-Range Nuclear Forces (INF) Treaty. See Washington Summit (1987).

=== 1988 ===
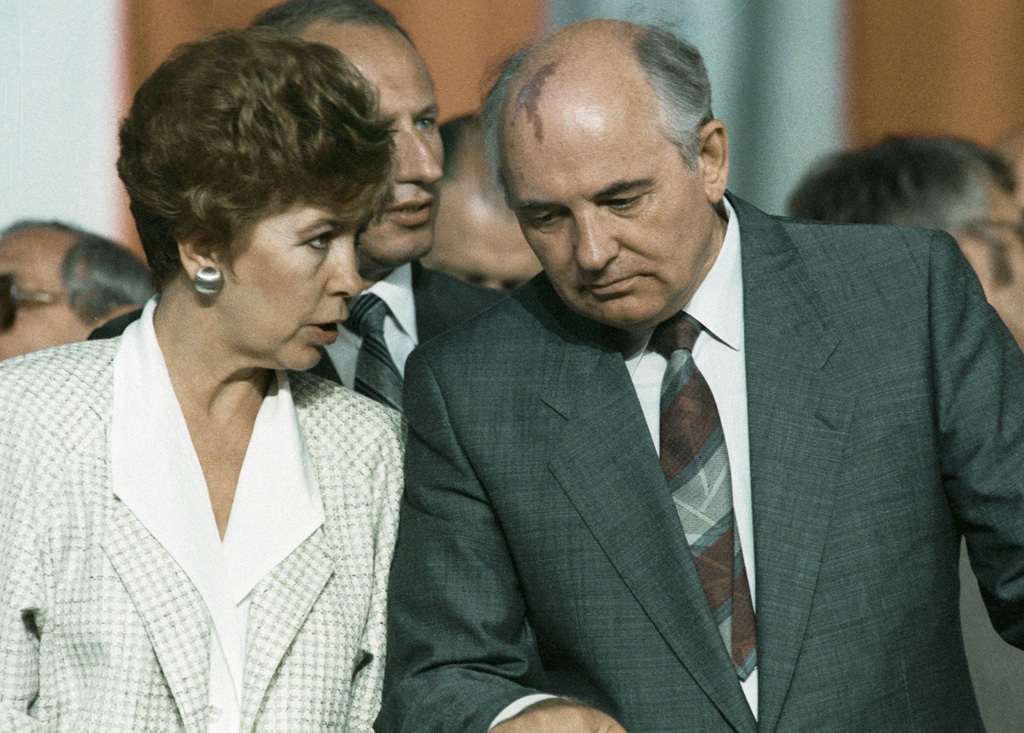
Gorbachev (right) and his spouse Raisa Gorbacheva after a meeting in Wawel Castle during a visit to Poland, July 1988

The following are the international trips made by Gorbachev in 1988:

Country	Locations visited	Date(s)	Details
Yugoslavia	Belgrade; Dubrovnik; Brdo pri Kranju	14-19 March	State visit.
Poland	Warsaw; Kraków; Szczecin	11–17 July	State visit and Warsaw Pact summit
India	New Delhi	17–21 November	State visit. Gorbachev met with Prime Minister Rajiv Gandhi to strengthen Indo-Soviet relations and discuss international security, disarmament, and the changing international order.
United States	New York City	7–8 December	Gorbachev left the Governors Island Summit early due to the 1988 Spitak earthquake which struck the Armenian S.S.R. that same day. See Governors Island Summit.

=== 1989 ===
The following are the international trips made by Gorbachev in 1989:

Country	Areas visited	Date(s)	Details
Ireland	Shannon, County Clare	2 April	Stopover visit en route to Cuba. Met with Taoiseach Charles Haughey and Tánaiste Brian Lenihan Snr at Shannon Airport.
Cuba	Havana	2–5 April	State visit
United Kingdom	London	6–8 April	He was also received at Heathrow Airport by Prime Minister Margaret Thatcher with full military honors provided by the Queen's Colour Squadron. He was also received with full military honors from the Coldstream Guards at Windsor Castle with Queen Elizabeth II.
China	Beijing	15–18 May	See 1989 Sino-Soviet Summit
West Germany	Bonn	12–16 June	
France	Paris; Strasbourg	4–6 July	
East Germany	East Berlin	6–7 October	Attended the GDR's ruby jubilee military parade and celebrations.
Finland	Helsinki; Oulu	25–27 October	State visit. Met with President Mauno Koivisto and Prime Minister Harri Holkeri
Vatican City	Vatican City	29 November	Met with Pope John Paul II.
Italy	Rome	29 November – 1 December	State Visit
Malta	Birżebbuġa (Maksim Gorkiy)	1–3 December	See Malta Summit

=== 1990 ===
The following are the international trips made by Gorbachev in 1990:

Country	Areas visited	Date(s)	Details
Canada	Ottawa	29–30 May	He visited on a 36-hour stopover to Washington, in which he was received by Prime Minister Brian Mulroney and Governor General Ray Hnatyshyn, with the latter welcoming him with full honors at the airport by the RCMP.
United States	Washington; Camp David	30 May–3 June	Signed the 1990 Chemical Weapons Accord. See Washington Summit
United States	Twin Cities, Minnesota	3 June	State visit following the Washington Summit. Gorbachev met with Governor Rudy Perpich at the Minnesota Governor's Residence, toured St. Paul and Minneapolis, met with business leaders, and visited Control Data Corporation in Bloomington.
Finland	Helsinki	9 September	Discussed the Iraqi invasion of Kuwait with U.S. President George H.W. Bush. See Helsinki Summit
France	Paris	19 November	Signing of the Treaty on Conventional Armed Forces in Europe, during the Conference on Security and Cooperation in Europe summit in Paris.

=== 1991 ===
The following are the international trips made by Gorbachev in 1991:

Country	Areas visited	Date(s)	Details
Japan	Tokyo	15–19 April	State visit. Gorbachev became the first Soviet leader to visit Japan, meeting with Emperor Akihito and Prime Minister Toshiki Kaifu to discuss improving Soviet-Japanese relations, economic cooperation, and the Kuril Islands dispute.
South Korea	Cheju Island	19 April	Working visit. Gorbachev met with President Roh Tae-woo to strengthen Soviet-South Korean relations. The two sides discussed economic cooperation and a proposed joint natural-gas development project, while the Soviet Union reaffirmed its opposition to North Korea's nuclear program.
Norway	Oslo	4–5 June	Nobel Peace Prize acceptance
Sweden	Stockholm	6 June	Working visit. met with Prime Minister Ingvar Carlsson and Brazilian President Fernando Collor de Mello.
United Kingdom	London	17 July	He attended the 17th G7 summit at the invitation of Prime Minister John Major, where he discussed the Soviet economy, political and economic reforms, and arms control with G7 leaders.
Spain	Madrid	29–30 October	Co-chaired the Madrid Peace Conference with U.S. President George H. W. Bush. The conference brought Israel, Syria, Lebanon, Jordan, and a joint Jordanian-Palestinian delegation together for direct negotiations aimed at resolving the Arab–Israeli conflict.

== Cancelled visits ==
Country	Areas to be visited	Date(s)	Details
Mexico	Mexico City	1987	
Greece	Athens	1987	
Cuba	Havana	1988	Planned as a stop on Gorbachev's December 1988 trip to the United States, but cancelled after he cut short his visit to New York following the 1988 Spitak earthquake in the Armenian S.S.R.. The visit was to have taken place before his planned visit to the United Kingdom.
Norway	Oslo	10 December 1990	Was supposed to accept the Nobel Peace Prize

== See also ==
- List of Soviet Union–United States summits
- List of international presidential trips made by Vladimir Putin
- List of international presidential trips made by Boris Yeltsin
- List of international presidential trips made by Dmitry Medvedev
