= List of international trips made by Xi Jinping =

This is a list of international trips made by Xi Jinping during his tenure as the general secretary of the Chinese Communist Party and the president of China. Xi Jinping has made 56 international trips to 71 countries since he assumed the top leadership on 15 November 2012. Xi's travels currently take place on a modified Air China 747-8.

== Summary ==
The number of visits per country where he has travelled are:

- One visit to: Australia, Bangladesh, Belarus, Belgium, Brunei, Chile, Costa Rica, Cuba, Czech Republic, Ecuador, Fiji, Finland, Hungary, Iran, Japan, Laos, Maldives, Mauritius, Mexico, Monaco, Mongolia, Morocco, Myanmar, Nepal, the Netherlands, New Zealand, Pakistan, Panama, Papua New Guinea, Poland, Republic of the Congo, Rwanda, Senegal, Singapore, Sri Lanka, Switzerland, Tanzania, Thailand, Trinidad and Tobago, Turkey, Turkmenistan, United Arab Emirates, United Kingdom, Venezuela, and Zimbabwe.
- Two visits to: Argentina, Cambodia, Egypt, Germany, Greece, Italy, Malaysia, North Korea, Peru, Philippines, Portugal, Saudi Arabia, Serbia, South Korea, and Spain.
- Three visits to: Brazil, Indonesia, Kyrgyzstan, Tajikistan, and Uzbekistan.
- Four visits to: France, India, South Africa, and Vietnam.
- Six visits to: Kazakhstan and the United States
- Eleven visits to: Russia.

World map highlighting countries visited by Xi Jinping during his leadership, as of November 2026. One visit Two visits Three visits Four visits Five visits Six visits Seven or more visits China

== 2013 ==
| | Dates | Country | Locations | Details | Image |
|---|---|---|---|---|---|
| 1 | 22–24 March | Russia | Moscow | State visit; His first foreign trip as China's paramount leader and state representative. Met with President Vladimir Putin to discuss bilateral ties. Discussions of a new comprehensive strategic cooperation plan between China and Russia were held. Increased tourism cooperation and cultural ties were agreed upon. Met with Chairman of the State Duma Sergei Naryshkin to discuss enhancement of inter-parliamentary ties between China and Russia. Met with Russian Defense Minister Sergei Shoigu to discuss increased military ties between China and Russia. Met with Russian Minister of Far East Development Viktor Ishayev to discuss increased economic cooperation in the Russian Far East. | |
| 1 | 24–25 March | Tanzania | Dar es Salaam | State visit; Met with President of Tanzania Jakaya Mrisho Kikwete to discuss bilateral ties. A joint communique was signed on boosting friendly cooperation between China and Tanzania. Met with President of Zanzibar Ali Mohamed Shein to discuss bilateral ties. | |
| 1 | 25–29 March | South Africa | Pretoria, Durban | State visit and attendance to the 5th BRICS summit. | |
| 1 | 29–30 March | Republic of the Congo | Brazzaville | State visit; Met with President Denis Sassou Nguesso to discuss bilateral ties. Talks were held to improve cooperation between Chinese doctors and African health services. | |
| 2 | 31 May–2 June | Trinidad and Tobago | Port of Spain | Met with President of Trinidad and Tobago Anthony Carmona and Prime Minister of Trinidad and Tobago Kamla Persad-Bissessar to discuss bilateral ties. Met with Trinidad and Tobago Senate President Timothy Hamel-Smith and Speaker of the House Wade Mark to discuss increased legislative exchanges between China and Trinidad and Tobago. Met with President of Guyana Donald Ramotar to discuss bilateral ties. Met with President of Suriname Dési Bouterse to discuss bilateral ties. | |
| 2 | 2–4 June | Costa Rica | San José | | |
| 2 | 4–7 June | Mexico | Mexico City | | |
| 2 | 7–9 June | United States | Ontario; Rancho Mirage; Indian Wells; Palm Springs | Met with President Barack Obama at Sunnylands Estate in Rancho Mirage in a 'shirtsleeves summit', although this was not considered a formal state visit. Also met with California Governor Jerry Brown at Indian Wells and Palm Springs. | |
| 3 | 3–4 September | Turkmenistan | Ashgabat | Met and discussed bilateral ties with President Gurbanguly Berdymukhamedov. Agreements reached on promotion of energy cooperation between China and Turkmenistan. | |
| 3 | 4–6 September | Russia | Saint Petersburg | State visit and attendance to the 8th G20 summit. | |
| 3 | 6–7 September | Kazakhstan | Astana | | |
| 3 | 8–9 September | Uzbekistan | Tashkent | | |
| 3 | 10–13 September | Kyrgyzstan | Bishkek | State visit and attendance to the 13th meeting of the Shanghai Cooperation Organisation. | |
| 4 | 2 October | Indonesia | Jakarta | | |
| 4 | 3–5 October | Malaysia | Kuala Lumpur | | |
| 4 | 5–8 October | Indonesia | Bali | Attendance to the APEC Indonesia 2013. | |

== 2014 ==
| | Dates | Country | Locations | Details | Image |
|---|---|---|---|---|---|
| 1 | 6–8 February | Russia | Sochi | Attendance to the opening ceremony of the 2014 Winter Olympics. | |
| 2 | 22–25 March | Netherlands | Amsterdam, The Hague | State visit and attendance to the 3rd Nuclear Security Summit. | |
| 2 | 25–27 March | France | Lyon | | |
| 2 | 27–29 March | Germany | Berlin | | |
| 2 | 30 March–1 April | Belgium | Brussels, Bruges | State visit | |
| 3 | 3–4 July | South Korea | Seoul | State visit. Met with President Park Geun-hye. | |
| 4 | 14 July | Greece | Rhodes | Stop over. | |
| 4 | 14–16 July | Brazil | Fortaleza, Brasília | State visit and attendance to the 6th BRICS summit. | |
| 4 | 19–20 July | Argentina | Buenos Aires | State visit | |
| 4 | 20–21 July | Venezuela | Caracas | State visit | |
| 4 | 21–23 July | Cuba | Havana | State visit | |
| 5 | 21–22 August | Mongolia | Ulaanbaatar | State visit | |
| 6 | 11–14 September | Tajikistan | Dushanbe | State visit and attendance to 14th meeting of the Shanghai Cooperation Organisation. | |
| 6 | 14–16 September | Maldives | Malé | | |
| 6 | 16–17 September | Sri Lanka | Colombo | Xi set out the basis for China's funding of a land reclamation project in Sri Lanka and announced an approximately USD 400 million funding for the expansion of Hambantota Port with the involvement of China Harbor and China Merchants. | |
| 6 | 17–19 September | India | New Delhi Ahmedabad | State visit. Met with Prime Minister Narendra Modi. Visited New Delhi and also went to Modi's hometown in the state of Gujarat. | |
| 7 | 14–19 November | Australia | Brisbane, Sydney, Canberra, Hobart | Xi Jinping became the third Chinese President to visit Australia, after his two predecessors. Xi Jinping first attended the G20 Summit in Brisbane. He then flew to Australia's capital, Canberra to address a Joint Sitting of Australian Parliament, hold talks with Prime Minister Tony Abbott, Governor-General Peter Cosgrove and other Australian officials. He then went to Hobart, Tasmania, becoming the first Chinese paramount leader ever to visit the island state. He held talks with Tasmanian officials, including the wife of the late ex-Premier Jim Bacon. He then went to Sydney, New South Wales, to hold talks with senior NSW officials, as well as meet business leaders. After he finished his visit to Sydney, he flew directly to New Zealand (see below for more). | |
| 7 | 19–21 November | New Zealand | Auckland | | |
| 7 | 21–23 November | Fiji | Nadi | | |

== 2015 ==
| | Dates | Country | Locations | Details | Image |
|---|---|---|---|---|---|
| 1 | 20–21 April | Pakistan | Islamabad, Murree | State visit. Signed a series of infrastructure deals worth $45 billion related to the China–Pakistan Economic Corridor. During his visit, Pakistan's highest civilian award, the Nishan-e-Pakistan, was conferred upon him. | |
| 1 | 22–24 April | Indonesia | Bandung, Jakarta | Met with President Joko Widodo. Attended the Afro-Asian Leaders Summit and the 60th Anniversary events of the Bandung Conference. | |
| 2 | 7 May | Kazakhstan | Astana | Met with President Nursultan Nazarbayev. | |
| 2 | 8–9 May | Russia | Moscow | State visit and participation in the festivities commemorating the 2015 Moscow Victory Day Parade. Xi was the guest-of-honour of President Vladimir Putin at the Parade. At the parade, Xi and his wife Peng Liyuan sat next to Putin. | |
| 2 | 10–11 May | Belarus | Minsk | State visit. Met with President Alexander Lukashenko. | |
| 3 | 8–11 July | Russia | Ufa | Attendance to the 7th BRICS summit. | |
| 3 | 8–11 July | Russia | Ufa | Attendance to the 15th meeting of the Shanghai Cooperation Organisation. | |
| 4 | 22–28 September | United States | Seattle, Washington D.C., New York City | State visit. Met with President Barack Obama. This was his first state visit to the United States. | |
| 5 | 19–24 October | United Kingdom | London, Manchester | State visit. Met with Queen Elizabeth II, Prime Minister David Cameron and other dignitaries. Longest visit ever made by Xi abroad. Increased customs, trade, and research collaborations between China and the U.K. were discussed, but more informal events also took place including a visit to Manchester City's football academy. | |
| 6 | 5–6 November | Vietnam | Hanoi | State visit. | |
| 6 | 6–7 November | Singapore | Singapore | State visit and First Ma–Xi meeting. | |
| 7 | 14–16 November | Turkey | Antalya | State visit and attendance to 10th G20 summit. | |
| 7 | 17–19 November | Philippines | Manila | Attendance to the APEC Philippines 2015. | |
| 8 | 29–30 November | France | Paris | Attendance to the 2015 United Nations Climate Change Conference. | |
| 8 | 30 November–1 December | Zimbabwe | Harare | | |
| 8 | 2–5 December | South Africa | Pretoria, Johannesburg | | |

== 2016 ==
| | Dates | Country | Locations | Details | Image |
|---|---|---|---|---|---|
| 1 | 19–20 January | Saudi Arabia | Riyadh | | |
| 1 | 20–21 January | Egypt | Cairo | | |
| 1 | 22 January | Iran | Tehran | | |
| 2 | 28–29 March | Czech Republic | Prague | Met with the Czech president, prime minister and other representatives to promote relations and economic cooperation between the Czech Republic and the PRC. His visit was met by a considerable number of protests by Czechs. | |
| 3 | 31 March–1 April | United States | Washington D.C. | Attendance to the 4th Nuclear Security Summit. | |
| 4 | 18 June | Serbia | Belgrade | | |
| 4 | 20 June | Poland | Warsaw | | |
| 4 | 21–24 June | Uzbekistan | Bukhara, Tashkent | State visit and attendance to the 16th meeting of the Shanghai Cooperation Organisation. | |
| 5 | 13 October | Cambodia | Phnom Penh | | |
| 5 | 14 October | Bangladesh | Dhaka | | |
| 5 | 15 October | India | Benaulim (Goa) | State visit and attendance to the 8th BRICS summit. | |
| 6 | 17 November | Ecuador | Quito | | |
| 6 | 19–21 November | Peru | Lima | State visit and attendance to the APEC Peru 2016. | |
| 6 | 22–23 November | Chile | Santiago | | |
| 6 | 24 November | Spain | Gran Canaria | | |

== 2017 ==
| | Dates | Country | Locations | Details | Image |
|---|---|---|---|---|---|
| 1 | 16–17 January | Switzerland | Bern, Davos | State visit and attendance to the World Economic Forum, the first Chinese paramount leader to attend the WEF. Xi addressed the forum in a high-profile keynote, addressing globalization, the global trade agenda, and China's rising place in the world's economy and international governance; he made a series of pledges about China's defense of "economic globalization" and climate change accords. During the visit, Xi also visited the World Health Organization, the United Nations and the International Olympic Committee. | |
| 2 | 5 April | Finland | Helsinki | | |
| 2 | 6–9 April | United States | Palm Beach, Florida | Met with President Donald Trump at Mar-a-Lago, although this was not considered a formal state visit. | |
| 3 | 7 June | Kazakhstan | Astana | State visit and attendance to the 17th meeting of the Shanghai Cooperation Organisation and the Expo 2017. | |
| 4 | 3 July | Russia | Moscow | | |
| 4 | 4–8 July | Germany | Berlin, Hamburg | State visit and attendance to the 12th G20 summit. | |
| 5 | 10–12 November | Vietnam | Hanoi | State visit and attendance to the APEC Vietnam 2017. | |
| 5 | 13–14 November | Laos | Vientiane | State visit | |

== 2018 ==
| | Dates | Country | Locations | Details | Image |
|---|---|---|---|---|---|
| 1 | 20 July | United Arab Emirates | Abu Dhabi | | |
| 1 | 21 July | Senegal | Dakar | | |
| 1 | 22 July | Rwanda | Kigali | Xi and Peng Liyuan met with President Paul Kagame and his wife Jeannette Kagame. First visit by a Chinese paramount leader. | |
| 1 | 24–27 July | South Africa | Pretoria, Johannesburg | State visit and attendance to 10th BRICS summit. | |
| 1 | 27 July | Mauritius | Port Louis | | |
| 2 | 11–13 September | Russia | Vladivostok | Attendance to the 4th Eastern Economic Forum. | |
| 3 | 16–17 November | Papua New Guinea | Port Moresby | State visit and attendance to the APEC Papua New Guinea 2018. | |
| 3 | 18–20 November | Brunei | Bandar Seri Begawan | | |
| 3 | 20–21 November | Philippines | Manila | State visit | |
| 4 | 27–29 November | Spain | Madrid | Met with the King Felipe VI, Prime Minister Pedro Sánchez and speakers of the Congress and Senate. Multiple bilateral relationship issues were discussed, including an invitation for Spain to join the Belt and Road Initiative. Agreements were signed addressing double taxation, scientific products or exports of Spanish food products. | |
| 4 | 30 November–1 December | Argentina | Buenos Aires | State visit and attendance to the 13th G20 summit. | |
| 4 | 3 December | Panama | Panama City | | |
| 4 | 4–5 December | Portugal | Lisbon | | |

== 2019 ==
| | Dates | Country | Locations | Details | Image |
|---|---|---|---|---|---|
| 1 | 22–24 March | Italy | Rome | State visit. | |
| 1 | 24 March | Monaco | Monaco | Met with Albert II, Prince of Monaco. | |
| 1 | 24–26 March | France | Nice; Paris | State visit. | |
| 2 | 5–8 June | Russia | Moscow; St. Petersburg | State visit and attendance to the St. Petersburg International Economic Forum. | |
| 3 | 12–14 June | Kyrgyzstan | Bishkek | State visit and attendance to the meeting of the Shanghai Cooperation Organisation. | |
| 3 | 14–16 June | Tajikistan | Dushanbe | State visit and attendance to the meeting of the Conference on Interaction and Confidence-Building Measures in Asia. | |
| 4 | 20–21 June | North Korea | Pyongyang | State visit. First Chinese leader to visit North Korea since his predecessor Hu Jintao's visit in 2005. See Kim–Xi meetings. | |
| 5 | 27–29 June | Japan | Osaka | Attendance to the 14th G20 summit. Met with U.S. President Donald Trump. | |
| 6 | 11–12 October | India | Chennai Mahabalipuram | Informal summit with Prime Minister Narendra Modi. | |
| 6 | 12–13 October | Nepal | Kathmandu | State visit. | |
| 7 | 10–12 November | Greece | Athens | State visit. | |
| 7 | 12–14 November | Brazil | Brasília | Attendance to the 11th BRICS summit. Met with President Jair Bolsonaro. | |

== 2020 ==
| | Dates | Country | Locations | Details | Image |
|---|---|---|---|---|---|
| 1 | 17–18 January | Myanmar | Nay Pyi Taw | State visit. Met President Win Myint, State Councillor Aung San Suu Kyi and military leader Min Aung Hlaing. | |

Between 2020 and 2022, Xi paused foreign travel, speculated to be due to the COVID-19 pandemic.

== 2022 ==
| | Dates | Country | Locations | Details | Image |
|---|---|---|---|---|---|
| 1 | 14 September | Kazakhstan | Nur-Sultan | State visit. Xi's first visit outside China since January 2020, the start of the COVID-19 pandemic. Met with President Kassym-Jomart Tokayev. | |
| 1 | 14–16 September | Uzbekistan | Samarkand | State visit and attendance to 2022 Samarkand SCO summit. Met with Central Asian leaders as well as Russian president Vladimir Putin, his first since Russia invaded Ukraine on 24 February 2022. | |
| 2 | 14–17 November | Indonesia | Bali | Attendance to the 17th G20 summit. Met numerous world leaders including the US president Joe Biden, Australian Prime Minister Anthony Albanese, French President Emmanuel Macron and South Korean president Yoon Suk-yeol. | |
| 2 | 17–19 November | Thailand | Bangkok | State visit and attendance to the APEC Thailand 2022. Met with leaders including Japanese Prime Minister Fumio Kishida, New Zealand Prime Minister Jacinda Ardern, Thai Prime Minister Prayut Chan-o-cha and US Vice President Kamala Harris. | |
| 3 | 7–10 December | Saudi Arabia | Riyadh | State visit and attendance to the China-Arab States Summit and China-GCC Summit. Met king Salman, and crown prince and prime minister Mohammed bin Salman. Xi also met with numerous Arab leaders, including members of the Gulf Cooperation Council. During the meeting, he signed numerous commercial deals with Saudi Arabia and formally elevated the relationship to comprehensive strategic partnership, highest level in China's formal ranking of relations with other countries. | |

== 2023 ==
| | Dates | Country | Locations | Details | Image |
|---|---|---|---|---|---|
| 1 | 20–22 March | Russia | Moscow | State visit. Second meeting with Putin after the Russian invasion of Ukraine, as well as his first trip overseas after the 2023 National People's Congress. The visited came at the backdrop of Russia's invasion of Ukraine, as well as an arrest warrant for Putin issued by the International Criminal Court. During the visit, Xi met with Putin, as well as Prime Minister Mikhail Mishustin. Putin and Xi signed a joint statement vowing to expand ties, and officially promoted a new "multipolar world". | |
| 2 | 21–24 August | South Africa | Pretoria; Johannesburg | State visit and attendance to the 15th BRICS summit. Met with various BRICS leaders, as well as various leaders from the African continent. | |
| 3 | 14–17 November | United States | Woodside | Met with President Joe Biden at Filoli Estate in Woodside, although this was not considered a formal state visit. | |
| 3 | 14–17 November | United States | San Francisco | Attendance to the APEC United States 2023. | |
| 4 | 12–13 December | Vietnam | Hanoi | State visit. | |

== 2024 ==
| | Dates | Country | Locations | Details | Image |
|---|---|---|---|---|---|
| 1 | 5–7 May | France | Paris; Tarbes | State visit. Met with French president Emmanuel Macron and European Commission President Ursula von der Leyen. | |
| 1 | 7–8 May | Serbia | Belgrade | State visit | |
| 1 | 8–10 May | Hungary | Budapest | State visit | |
| 2 | 2–4 July | Kazakhstan | Astana | State visit and attendance to the 2024 SCO summit. | |
| 2 | 4–6 July | Tajikistan | Dushanbe | State visit | |
| 3 | 22–24 October | Russia | Kazan | Attendance to the 16th BRICS summit. | |
| 4 | 14–17 November | Peru | Lima | Attendance to the APEC Peru 2024. State visit. | |
| 4 | 17–21 November | Brazil | Rio de Janeiro & Brasília | Attendance to the 19th G20 summit. State visit. | |
| 4 | 21–22 November | Morocco | Casablanca | Met with Crown Prince, head of government and other officials. | |

== 2025 ==
| | Dates | Country | Locations | Details | Image |
|---|---|---|---|---|---|
| 1 | 14–15 April | Vietnam | Hanoi | State visit | |
| 1 | 15–17 April | Malaysia | Kuala Lumpur | State visit | |
| 1 | 17–18 April | Cambodia | Phnom Penh | State visit | |
| 2 | 7–10 May | Russia | Moscow | State visit and participation in the festivities commemorating the 2025 Moscow Victory Day Parade. | |
| 3 | 16–18 June | Kazakhstan | Astana | State visit and participation in the 2025 China–Central Asia Summit. | |
| 4 | 30 October–1 November | South Korea | Busan | Met with U.S. President Donald Trump at the Busan Summit. | |
| 4 | 30 October–1 November | South Korea | Gyeongju | Attendance to the APEC South Korea 2025. | |

== 2026 ==
| | Dates | Country | Locations | Details | Image |
|---|---|---|---|---|---|
| 1 | 8–9 June | North Korea | Pyongyang | State visit. See Kim–Xi meetings. | |
| 2 | 30 August–1 September | Kyrgyzstan | Bishkek | State visit. At the invitation of President Sadyr Japarov, Xi Jinping paid state visit to Kyrgyzstan and attended the 2026 SCO Summit. Also the planned attend opening ceremony of the 6th World Nomad Games but to directly oversee the response to flood and landslide disasters and search and rescue operations in the Tibetan region decided not to attend. | |
| 2 | 2–3 September | Egypt | Cairo | State visit. At the invitation of President Abdel Fattah el-Sisi, Xi Jinping is paying a state visit to Egypt, in order to coincide with the 70th anniversary of bilateral diplomatic ties between the two countries. | |
| 3 | 12–13 September | India | New Delhi | Attended to the 18th BRICS summit. | |
| 4 | 23–25 September | United States | Washington, D.C. | State visit. Met with President Donald Trump. This was his second state visit to the United States. | |

== Future trips ==
| Country | Location | Date | Details |
|---|---|---|---|
| United States | Miami | 14–15 December | Xi is planning to attend the 2026 G20 Miami summit. |

== Multilateral meetings ==
| Group | Year | | | | | | | | | | | | | |
| Group | 2013 | 2014 | 2015 | 2016 | 2017 | 2018 | 2019 | 2020 | 2021 | 2022 | 2023 | 2024 | 2025 | 2026 |
|---|---|---|---|---|---|---|---|---|---|---|---|---|---|---|
| APEC | 5–7 October, (Indonesia) Bali | 10–11 November, (China) Beijing | 18–19 November, (Philippines) Manila | 19–20 November, (Peru) Lima | 10–11 November, (Vietnam) Đà Nẵng | 17–18 November, (Papua New Guinea) Port Moresby | 16–17 November, (Chile) Santiago (cancelled) | 20 November, (Malaysia) Kuala Lumpur | 12 November, (New Zealand) Auckland | 18–19 November, (Thailand) Bangkok | 12–18 November, (United States) San Francisco | 15–16 November, (Peru) Lima | 31 October–1 November, (South Korea) Gyeongju | November 18–19, (China) Shenzhen |
| BRICS | 26–27 March, (South Africa) Durban | 14–16 July, (Brazil) Fortaleza | 8–9 July, (Russia) Ufa | 15–16 October, (India) Benaulim | 3–5 September, (China) Xiamen | 25–27 July, (South Africa) Johannesburg | 13–14 November, (Brazil) Brasília | 17 November, (Russia) Saint Petersburg | 9 September, (India) New Delhi | 23 June, (China) Beijing | 22–24 August, (South Africa) Johannesburg | 22–24 October, (Russia) Kazan | 6–7 July,^{[a]} (Brazil) Rio de Janeiro | 12–13 September, (India) New Delhi |
| G-20 | 5–6 September, (Russia) Saint Petersburg | 15–16 November, (Australia) Brisbane | 15–16 November, (Turkey) Antalya | 4–5 September, (China) Hangzhou | 7–8 July, (Germany) Hamburg | 30 November–1 December, (Argentina) Buenos Aires | 28–29 June, (Japan) Osaka | 21–22 November, (Saudi Arabia) Riyadh | 30–31 October, (Italy) Rome | 15–16 November, (Indonesia) Bali | 9–10 September,^{[a]} (India) New Delhi | 18–19 November, (Brazil) Rio de Janeiro | November 22–23,^{[a]} (South Africa) Johannesburg | December 14–15, (United States) Miami |
| SCO | 13 September, (Kyrgyzstan) Bishkek | 11–12 September, (Tajikistan) Dushanbe | 9–10 July, (Russia) Ufa | 23–24 June, (Uzbekistan) Tashkent | 8–9 June, (Kazakhstan) Astana | 7–8 June, (China) Qingdao | 14–15 June, (Kyrgyzstan) Bishkek | 10 November, (Russia) Moscow | 16–17 September, (Tajikistan) Dushanbe | 15–16 September, (Uzbekistan) Samarkand | 4 July, (India) Goa | 2–4 July, (Kazakhstan) Astana | 31 August–1 September, (China) Tianjin | 31 August–1 September, (Kyrgyzstan) Bishkek |
██ = Future event ██ = Did not attend ██ = Video conference^a Premier Li Qiang attended in the paramount leader's place.

== See also ==
- List of international premieral trips made by Li Keqiang, the Premier of China between 2013 to 2023
- List of international premieral trips made by Li Qiang, the Premier of China since 2023
- List of international trips made by Hu Jintao, his predecessor
