= 2026 state visit by Xi Jinping to Kyrgyzstan and Egypt =

2026 state visits by Chinese leader Xi Jinping

2026 state visits by Xi Jinping to Kyrgyzstan and Egypt
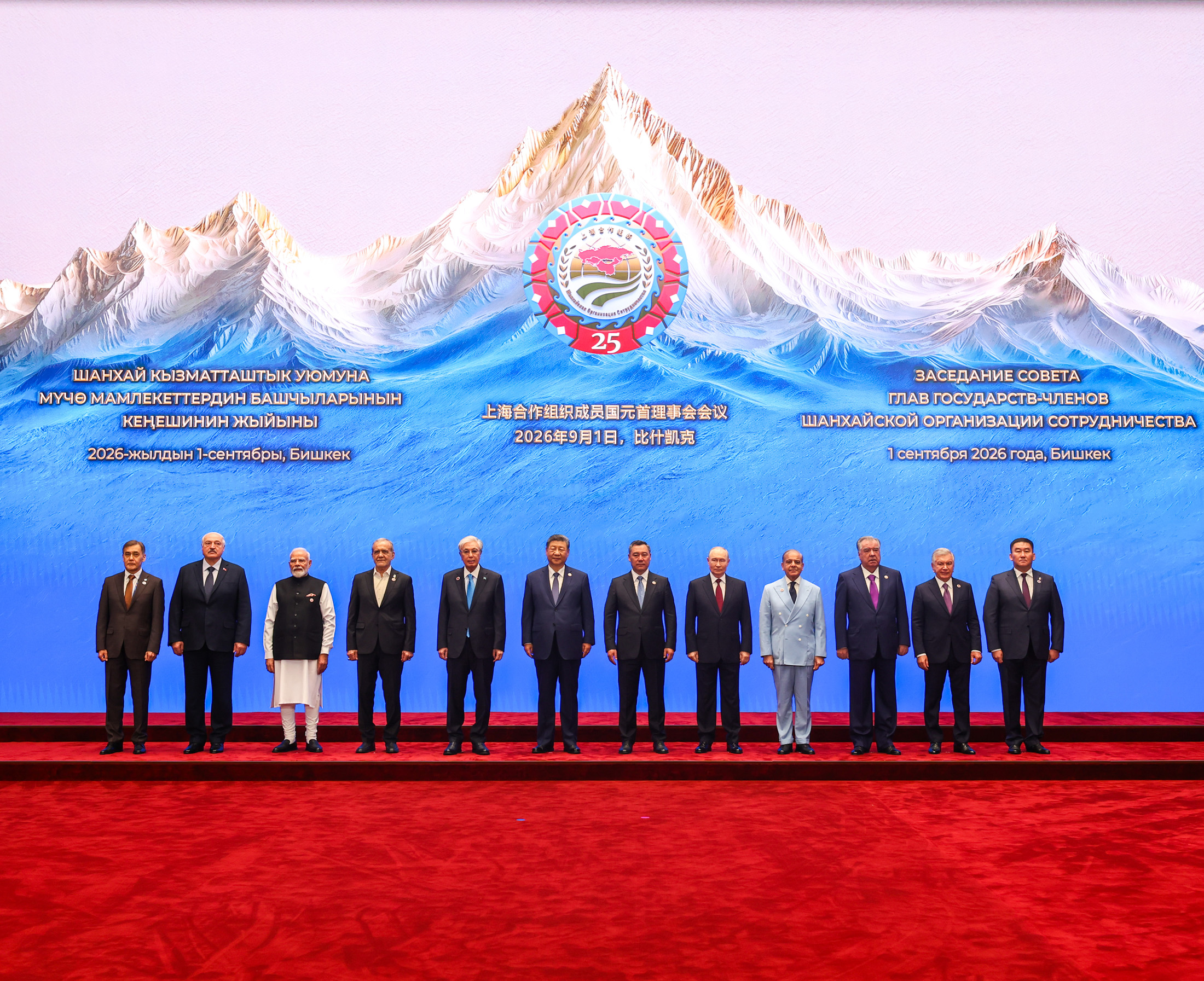
- Xi Jinping and other leaders at the 2026 Bishkek SCO summit on September 1, 2026
- Date: August 30 – September 2, 2026
- Location: Bishkek, Kyrgyzstan Cairo and Giza, Egypt
- Organised by: Government of China; Government of Kyrgyzstan; Government of Egypt
- Participants: Xi Jinping; Sadyr Japarov; Abdel Fattah el-Sisi

From August 30 to September 2, 2026, Xi Jinping, the general secretary of the Chinese Communist Party and president of China, made state visits to Kyrgyzstan and Egypt. The trip also included Xi's participation in the 2026 Bishkek SCO summit in the Kyrgyz capital, Bishkek. China's foreign ministry had announced the trip as running from August 30 to September 3.

In Kyrgyzstan, Xi held talks with President Sadyr Japarov, and the two leaders signed a bilateral treaty on permanent good-neighborliness, friendship and cooperation and a joint declaration on their comprehensive strategic partnership. Xi also attended the SCO Summit. He also held a number of bilateral meetings with participating leaders.

At the invitation of President Abdel Fattah el-Sisi, the Egypt state visit was Xi's first visit to the country since 2016 and coincided with the 70th anniversary of diplomatic relations between China and Egypt.

== Background ==
=== China–Kyrgyzstan relations ===
China and Kyrgyzstan had expanded political and economic cooperation in the years preceding the visit. In February 2025, Xi and Japarov agreed to further develop the countries' comprehensive strategic partnership, and the two leaders met several times during 2025. China had also become Kyrgyzstan's largest trading partner, while construction of the Kyrgyz section of the China–Kyrgyzstan–Uzbekistan railway and development of the Bedel border crossing had become prominent bilateral infrastructure projects.

In July 2026, Chinese foreign minister Wang Yi visited Kyrgyzstan and met Japarov and Foreign Minister Jeenbek Kulubayev. Their talks covered trade, investment, infrastructure, the China–Kyrgyzstan–Uzbekistan railway and preparations for the SCO summit in Bishkek.

=== China–Egypt relations ===
Egypt was the first Arab and African state to establish diplomatic relations with the People's Republic of China, doing so in 1956. The two countries upgraded their relationship to a comprehensive strategic partnership in 2014. Xi previously visited Egypt in January 2016, while Sisi made several visits to China during the following decade. By 2026, bilateral trade was about US$20 billion annually and Chinese investment in Egypt exceeded US$10 billion, including projects associated with the Belt and Road Initiative and the Suez Canal Economic Zone.

Shortly before Xi's 2026 visit, the Chinese and Egyptian air forces held the "Eagles of Civilization 2026" joint exercise in Egypt, involving Chinese J-16 and Egyptian Rafale fighter aircraft. The exercise reflected the expansion of bilateral defense ties alongside economic cooperation.

== Visits ==
=== Kyrgyzstan ===
==== First day (August 30) ====
Xi arrived in Bishkek on the afternoon of August 30 with his wife, Peng Liyuan. They were received at Manas International Airport by Japarov and his wife, Aigul Japarova and greeted with traditional kyrgyz boorsok. Senior Chinese officials accompanying Xi included Cai Qi, director of the General Office of the Chinese Communist Party, and Foreign Minister Wang Yi.

As a sign of hospitality, Japarov and Aigul Japarova hosted a welcome informal banquet for Xi and Peng at Yntymak Ordo.

==== Second day (August 31) ====
On August 31, Xi and Japarov held talks at Yntymak Ordo in Bishkek. The two leaders signed the Joint Declaration of the People's Republic of China and the Kyrgyz Republic on the High-Quality Development of the Comprehensive Strategic Partnership for a New Era and the Treaty on Permanent Good-Neighborliness, Friendship and Cooperation between the People's Republic of China and the Kyrgyz Republic. They also witnessed the exchange of bilateral agreements and memoranda covering areas including transport, customs, investment, science and technology, education, agriculture and people-to-people exchanges.

Separately, on the morning of August 31, Peng Liyuan and Aigul Japarova visited the National Historical Museum of the Kyrgyz Republic. They viewed an exhibition of traditional Kyrgyz culture featuring costumes, carpets and other handicrafts, as well as the jointly organized Harmony Brings Beauty: Ancient Chinese Civilization Art Exhibition, and attended a display of traditional Kyrgyz costumes. Peng highlighted cultural heritage preservation and called for further cultural and people-to-people exchanges between China and Kyrgyzstan.

At noon, Japarov and his wife Aigul Japarova hosted an official state banquet for Xi and Peng Liyuan at Yntymak Ordo. Cai Qi and Wang Yi were among the Chinese officials attending.

In the afternoon, Xi held a series of bilateral meetings with leaders attending the SCO summit.

He met Russian President Vladimir Putin, with the two discussing bilateral economic cooperation and coordination on international and regional issues. Xi also met Uzbek President Shavkat Mirziyoyev, with discussions covering bilateral trade and investment, connectivity, energy and mineral resources, emerging technologies and progress on the China–Kyrgyzstan–Uzbekistan railway. In a separate meeting with Mongolian President Ukhnaagiin Khürelsükh, Xi discussed bilateral trade, connectivity, energy and mineral cooperation, as well as cooperation in areas including artificial intelligence and the digital economy.

The opening ceremony of the Sixth World Nomad Games was held, in the evening, at Bishkek Arena, alongside the SCO gathering. Xi had been expected to attend the ceremony with other visiting leaders but did not participate because of a deadly natural disaster in Tibet.

==== Third day (September 1) ====
On the morning of September 1, Xi attended the 26th Meeting of the Council of Heads of State of the Shanghai Cooperation Organisation, chaired by Kyrgyz President Sadyr Japarov at Rys Ordo Congress Hall. The meeting brought together the leaders of the SCO member states, including Belarusian President Alexander Lukashenko, Indian Prime Minister Narendra Modi, Iranian President Masoud Pezeshkian, Kazakh President Kassym-Jomart Tokayev, Pakistani Prime Minister Shehbaz Sharif, Russian President Vladimir Putin, Tajik President Emomali Rahmon and Uzbek President Shavkat Mirziyoyev. Xi joined the participating leaders for a group photograph before delivering a speech entitled Toward Higher-Quality Development of the Shanghai Cooperation Organization. He proposed increased cooperation in trade, investment and connectivity, as well as in artificial intelligence, the digital economy, green industries and security. Xi also announced plans for an international artificial-intelligence application cooperation centre for SCO countries, a China–SCO port economic cooperation centre in Tianjin, and 100 technological cooperation projects over the following three years.

At the conclusion of the meeting, the leaders adopted the Bishkek Declaration on the 25th Anniversary of the Shanghai Cooperation Organization, approved amendments to the SCO Charter and regulations establishing an SCO Universal Center for Countering Security Challenges and Threats and an Anti-drug Center, and adopted 28 outcome documents covering security, economic cooperation, cultural and people-to-people exchanges, and institutional development. Pakistan was designated to assume the SCO's rotating presidency for 2026–2027.

In the afternoon, Xi attended the expanded SCO Plus meeting, which also included leaders and representatives from partner and invited states and international organizations. Prior to the meeting, Japarov hosted a welcoming banquet for the heads of delegations, after which the participants posed for a group photograph. Xi delivered a second address, entitled Jointly Advocating an Equal and Orderly Multipolar World and Making Global Governance More Just and Equitable, in which he called for greater representation of developing countries in international affairs, closer coordination between the SCO and the United Nations, and expanded economic and development cooperation across Eurasia.

While Xi attended the summit, Peng participated in a parallel programme for the spouses of visiting leaders hosted by Aigul Japarova on the morning of September 1. At the Ala Archa State Residence, Peng and the other participants viewed an exhibition devoted to Kyrgyz national culture and posed for a group photograph. They subsequently attended a cultural performance at the Enesay Reception House. Peng praised the performances and invited Kyrgyz artists to undertake further performances and cultural exchanges in China.

Later that afternoon, Xi and Peng concluded this state visit to Kyrgyzstan and his participation in the SCO summit and departed Bishkek. Kyrgyz Prime Minister Adylbek Kasymaliev and other officials saw him off at the airport.

=== Egypt ===
Xi arrived in Cairo on the evening of September 1 for a two-day state visit. Xi and Peng were welcomed at Cairo International Airport by Sisi and First Lady Entissar el-Sisi. This 2026 visit coincided with the 70th anniversary of China–Egypt diplomatic relations.

On September 2, Sisi formally received Xi at Al-Ittihadiya Palace, where the ceremony included a guard of honor, the two national anthems and a 21-gun salute. The two presidents then held expanded talks with their delegations.

Following the talks, the two governments issued a joint statement on further deepening their comprehensive strategic partnership. Egyptian and Chinese officials said that more than 20 cooperation documents were signed during the visit, although a complete list was not immediately released. Publicly identified documents included agreements or memoranda on aligning cooperation under Egypt Vision 2030 and the Belt and Road Initiative, economic and technical cooperation, industrial and supply-chain cooperation, information technology, and cooperation in the Suez Canal Economic Zone.

The two leaders also agreed to launch the third phase of the China–Egypt TEDA Suez Economic and Trade Cooperation Zone in the Suez Canal Economic Zone. The planned expansion included renewable energy, automotive manufacturing, textiles and chemical fibers. The joint statement also set out cooperation priorities in data centers, semiconductors, critical-mineral supply chains, renewable energy, electric vehicles, digital transformation and greater use of local currencies in trade and investment. It also called for stronger cooperation in law enforcement, security and counterterrorism.

Regional security featured prominently in the talks. Xi called for Middle Eastern states to explore a new regional security architecture and said China was prepared to cooperate with regional countries on safeguarding shipping routes. The two sides also discussed the conflict involving Iran and the United States, the situation in Gaza, Red Sea security and the need for diplomatic settlements to regional conflicts. The joint statement additionally recorded China's recognition of the Nile's importance to Egypt and Egypt's position on protecting its water and food security.

On September 2, Sisi and Entissar el-Sisi accompanied Xi and Peng on a tour of the Grand Egyptian Museum in Giza. Xi departed Cairo later that day, concluding the Egypt state visit.

== See also ==
- China–Kyrgyzstan relations
- China–Egypt relations
- China–Kyrgyzstan–Uzbekistan railway
- List of international trips made by Xi Jinping
- 2026 Bishkek SCO summit
- Suez Canal Economic Zone
