= 2024 state visits by Xi Jinping to Kazakhstan and Tajikistan =

CCP General Secretary Xi Jinping's visit in 2024

State Visit by Xi Jinping to Kazakhstan and Tajikistan
- Venue: Astana and Dushanbe
- Organised by: Government of Kazakhstan; Government of Tajikistan; Government of China

From July 2 to 6, 2024, Chinese President and General Secretary of the Chinese Communist Party Xi Jinping attended the 2024 SCO summit in Astana and pay state visits to the Republic of Kazakhstan and the Republic of Tajikistan.

== Meeting ==
=== Kazakhstan ===
At noon on July 2, Xi Jinping arrived in Astana to attend the 24th meeting of the Council of the Heads of State of the Shanghai Cooperation Organization (SCO) member states and pay a state visit to Kazakhstan. President Kassym-Jomart Tokayev led his government's First Deputy Prime Minister Roman Sklyar, Deputy Prime Minister and Foreign Minister Murat Nurtleu, Presidential Advisor for Foreign Affairs Kazihan, Äkim of Astana Jenis Qasymbek and other senior officials to greet President Xi.

On the morning of July 3, Xi Jinping held talks with President Tokayev at the Presidential Palace in Astana. After the talks, the two heads of state signed the Joint Declaration of the People's Republic of China and the Republic of Kazakhstan (Chinese: 《中华人民共和国和哈萨克斯坦共和国联合声明》) and witnessed the exchange of dozens of bilateral cooperation documents in the fields of economy and trade, connectivity, aerospace, education and media. At noon on the same day, President Xi attended a welcome banquet hosted by President Tokayev.

At noon on July 3, President Xi and President Tokayev attended the opening ceremony of the China-Europe Trans-Caspian Express by video at the Presidential Palace in Astana. This is the first time that a Chinese vehicle arrived at a Caspian Sea coastal port by direct road transportation.

On the afternoon of July 4, Xi Jinping met with President Mirziyoyev of Uzbekistan, President Sadyr Japarov of Kyrgyzstan, President Ilham Aliyev of Azerbaijan (and signing of the joint statement on the establishment of a strategic partnership between the two countries), President Vladimir Putin of Russia, United Nations Secretary-General António Guterres, President Alexander Lukashenko of Belarus, President of Turkey Recep Tayyip Erdoğan in Astana on the sidelines of the 2024 SCO summit.

=== Tajikistan ===
On the evening of July 4, Xi Jinping arrived in Dushanbe for a state visit to Tajikistan. President Emomali Rahmon of Tajikistan led the Speaker of the Upper House of Parliament and Mayor of Dushanbe Rustam Emomali, Foreign Minister Muhreddin and other senior officials to meet him. Rahmon held a grand welcome ceremony for Xi at the airport.

On the afternoon of July 5, President Xi and President Rahmon attended the inauguration ceremony of the Chinese-aided parliament building and government building in Dushanbe. The China-aided Tajikistan Parliament Building and Government Building project is the first time that China adopts the joint design mode in foreign aid projects, and adopts Tajikistan's architectural style and China's construction technology, which is an important achievement of the "Belt and Road Initiative" jointly constructed by the two countries.

On the afternoon of July 5, President Xi and President Rahmon met with journalists after talks at the Presidential Palace in Dushanbe. The two countries signed a joint statement announcing the establishment of a new era of China-Tajikistan comprehensive strategic cooperative partnership (Chinese: 《中华人民共和国和塔吉克斯坦共和国关于发展新时代全面战略合作伙伴关系的联合声明》), and unanimously decided to work together from a higher starting point to build a China-Tajikistan community of destiny that will be friendly, mutually beneficial and win-win for generations. The Asian Infrastructure Investment Bank (AIIB) will provide Tajikistan with a soft loan of $500 million for the construction of the Rogun hydropower plant. Xi Jinping also presented the Order of Friendship to President Rahmon at the Presidential Palace in Dushanbe.

On the afternoon of July 6, Xi Jinping returned to Beijing after his state visit.

== See also ==
- 2024 SCO summit
- 2022 state visit by Xi Jinping to Kazakhstan and Uzbekistan
- List of international trips made by Xi Jinping
