= 2017 state visit by Xi Jinping to Vietnam and Laos =

- Date: November 10–14, 2017
- Venue: Hanoi and Vientiane
- Organised by: Government of Vietnam; Government of Laos; Government of China

At the invitation of the President of the Socialist Republic of Vietnam Trần Đại Quang, President of China and General Secretary of the Chinese Communist Party Xi Jinping went to Da Nang, Vietnam, from November 10–11, 2017, to attend the APEC Vietnam 2017. Xi Jinping then paid a state visit to Vietnam and Laos from November 12–14, 2017. This was the first state visit by the top leaders of the Chinese Communist Party and State after the 19th National Congress of the Chinese Communist Party.

== Background ==
Xi's visits have his dual capacity as the General Secretary of the Chinese Communist Party as well as President of China in this diplomatic activity. In November 2015, Xi's first visit to Vietnam since he became the supreme leader of the Party and the State was in a dual capacity. On January 12, 2017, Nguyễn Phú Trọng, General Secretary of the Communist Party of Vietnam, visited China. General Secretary Xi Jinping's visit to Vietnam is another annual exchange of visits between the top leaders of the two parties.

== Vietnam ==
On the afternoon of November 10, General Secretary Xi Jinping arrived in the central Vietnamese city of Da Nang to attend APEC Vietnam 2017. General Secretary Xi attended the APEC Business Leaders Summit and delivered a keynote speech, attended two phases of the informal leaders' meeting and working luncheon, attended the Dialogue between APEC Leaders and ASEAN Leaders, and the Dialogue between APEC Leaders and Representatives of the APEC Business Advisory Council. General Secretary Xi announced at the APEC meeting that China will host the first China International Import Expo in Shanghai in November 2018. Xi also met with Russian President Vladimir Putin during the period.

On November 11, Xi met with Prime Minister of Vietnam Nguyễn Xuân Phúc, where he urged the two neighbors to extend the breadth and depth of their comprehensive strategic cooperation. He also signed the Protocol on Upgrading the China-Chile Free Trade Agreement with President of Chile Michelle Bachelet. He also met with President of South Korea Moon Jae-in, President of the Philippines Rodrigo Duterte and Prime Minister of Japan Shinzo Abe.

Upon departure from Da Nang, senior officials including Vietnamese government ministers and the Chief Executive of the Hong Kong Special Administrative Region, Carrie Lam, saw them off at the airport.

On November 12, General Secretary Xi fled from Da Nang to Hanoi for an official state visit to Vietnam. General Secretary Xi held talks with Nguyễn Phú Trọng, the General Secretary of the Communist Party of Vietnam, at which the two sides reached a consensus on deepening the China-Vietnam comprehensive strategic partnership. After the talks, the two leaders witnessed the signing of memorandums of cooperation on "One Belt, One Road" and "Two Corridors, One Circle", as well as documents in the fields of production capacity, energy, cross-border economic cooperation zones, e-commerce, human resources, economy and trade, finance, culture, health, information, social sciences and border defense. Later, General Secretary Xi met with the Chairman of National Assembly of Vietnam Nguyễn Thị Kim Ngân, with the two sides saying they will strengthen cooperation at all levels of the legislature. The two attended the inauguration and handover ceremony of the Vietnam-China Friendship Palace and the opening ceremony of the Hanoi China Cultural Center.

On November 13, Xi met again with Nguyễn Phú Trọng. After the meeting, the two went to Ho Chi Minh's former residence to continue their exchanges. General Secretary Xi paid homage to President Ho Chi Minh's mausoleum and laid a wreath. Then, General Secretary Xi held talks with President of Vietnam Trần Đại Quang.

On the same day General Secretary Xi ended his state visit to Vietnam, Trần Quốc Vượng, the permanent secretary of the Central Secretariat and head of the Central Inspection Committee, waited at the airport to see him off.

== Laos ==
On November 13, General Secretary Xi arrived in Vientiane, the capital of Laos on the banks of the Mekong River, beginning the state visit to Lao People's Democratic Republic. The Standing Secretary of the Central Secretariat and Vice President of Laos Phankham Viphavanh and the Secretary of the Vientiane Municipal Party Committee and Mayor of Vientiane Sinlavong Khoutphaythoune, and Deputy Prime Minister Sonexay Siphandone, greeted the Chinese delegation at the Vadodara Airport.

On November 13, General Secretary Xi Jinping held talks with Bounnhang Vorachit, the General Secretary of the Lao People's Revolutionary Party and President of Laos. The two sides agreed to accelerate the dovetailing of China's Belt and Road Initiative with Laos' strategy of "turning a land-locked country into a land-connected country". After the talks, Xi and Bounnhang witnessed the signing of cooperation documents in the areas of China-Laos economic corridor construction, infrastructure construction, digital Silk Road, science and technology, agriculture, electricity, human resources, finance and water conservancy. General Secretary Xi also held meeting with Choummaly Sayasone, former General Secretary of the Central Committee of the Lao People's Revolutionary Party and former State President, in Vientiane.

On November 14, Xi Jinping met with Bounnhang Vorachit, the General Secretary of the Lao People's Revolutionary Party and President of Laos again. After the meeting, Xi and Bounnhang witnessed the signing of the Agreement between the Ministry of Foreign Affairs of the People's Republic of China and the Ministry of Foreign Affairs of the Lao People's Democratic Republic on Strengthening Cooperation in the New Situation. Besides, Xi joined Bounnhang in Vientiane to attend the groundbreaking ceremony of Mahoso General Hospital. General Secretary Xi also held talks with Prime Minister Thongloun Sisoulith and President of the National Assembly Pany Yathotou.

Same day, Xi met with friends of the Pholsena family of Laos in Vientiane. The Foreign Minister of the Kingdom of Laos Quinim Pholsena, who was assassinated, and his wife seriously wounded in the 1962. Their children were sheltering in China at the time. Some of them enrolled in Beijing Bayi School and were classmates of Xi Jinping.

== See also ==
- Boten–Vientiane railway
- APEC Vietnam 2017
- 2023 state visit by Xi Jinping to Vietnam
- List of international trips made by Xi Jinping
