= Eurasian Charter of Diversity and Multipolarity in the 21st Century =

Proposed treaty

- Type: Proposal

The Eurasian Charter of Diversity and Multipolarity in the 21st Century is a proposed Eurasian charter to achieve commitment to a multipolar world, recognition of Eurasia’s strategic significance, the creation of a new security architecture.

== History ==
In November 2024, Belarus and Russia completed work on a "Joint Vision" which establishes the key governing principles underlying the development of the Eurasian Charter. Principles include commitment to a multipolar world, recognition of strategic significance of Eurasia, the creation of a fresh security architecture, and a roadmap for implementing agreements among states which will participate in the charter.

In February 2026, Russia, Iran, Belarus, North Korea, and Myanmar have agreed to begin consultations on the development of a Eurasian Charter.

In May 2026, Belarusian Minister of Foreign Affairs Maxim Ryzhenkov proposed to launch the negotiation process on the Eurasian Charter during the high-level week of the 81st session of the United Nations General Assembly, which will take place in September. This is supposed to lead to "the adoption of the Charter at a summit of Eurasian leaders, which would presumably take place before the end of 2027".

On September 1st during the 2026 Shanghai Cooperation Organization Heads of State summit in Bishkek, President of Belarus Alexander Lukashenko said that the drafting of the charter will begin in Minsk in November during the annual Minsk Security Conference.

In November during the 4th Minsk International Conference on Eurasian Security, Russian Minister of Foreign Affairs Sergey Lavrov announced the launch of the drafting process for the Charter and the establishment of a dedicated working group, with its inaugural session scheduled to take place before the end of the year. At the same event, President of Belarus Alexander Lukashenko elaborated on his vision for the Charter, stating "The 1975 Final Act signed in Helsinki defined the terms of coexistence and co-operation within the bipolar system for decades to come. Today, however, we are moving towards a multipolar world. The Eurasian Charter seeks to become the Helsinki Act for a new, polycentric era."

== See also ==
- CRINK
