= List of international premieral trips made by Li Qiang =

This is a list of international trips made by Li Qiang, the premier of China since March 2023.

== Summary ==
The number of visits per country where he has travelled are:

- One visit to: Australia, Belarus, Brazil, France, Germany, Greece, Egypt, India, Ireland, Kyrgyzstan, Laos, New Zealand, North Korea, Pakistan, Philippines, Saudi Arabia, Singapore, South Korea, South Africa, Switzerland, Tajikistan, the United Arab Emirates, the United States, Uzbekistan, Vietnam, Zambia
- Two visits to: Indonesia
- Three visits to: Malaysia, Russia

World map highlighting countries visited by Li Qiang during his premiership, as of November 2026. One visit Two visits Three visits China

== 2023 ==
Dates	Country	Locations	Details
18–21 June	Germany	Berlin; Munich	Li met with German President Frank-Walter Steinmeier and Chancellor Olaf Scholz.
21–23 June	France	Paris	Li met with French President Emmanuel Macron, Prime Minister Élisabeth Borne and Senate President Gérard Larcher.
5–8 September	Indonesia	Jakarta	Li visited Jakarta, Indonesia, where he met with various ASEAN leaders. Li additionally met other leaders such as Australian prime minister Antony Albanese, Japanese prime minister Fumio Kishida and South Korean president Yoon Suk-yeol during various summits such as the ASEAN Plus Three summit and the East Asia Summit. Li Qiang also met with Indonesian president Joko Widodo, vowing $21.7 billion new Chinese investment in Indonesia.
9–10 September	India	New Delhi	Between 9 and 10 September, Li attended the G20 New Delhi summit, going in the place of state representative and CCP general secretary Xi Jinping, who did not attend. There, he met various leaders such as Italian prime minister Giorgia Meloni, President of the European Commission Ursula von der Leyen, US president Joe Biden, and British prime minister Rishi Sunak.
24–27 October	Kyrgyzstan	Bishkek	Li attended the 22nd meeting of the Council of Heads of Government of the Shanghai Cooperation Organization.

== 2024 ==
Dates	Country	Locations	Details
14–16 January	Switzerland	Zürich; Bern; Davos; Klosters	Li attended the annual meeting of World Economic Forum in Davos.
16–17 January	Ireland	Dublin	Li met with Taoiseach Leo Varadkar.
26–27 May	South Korea	Seoul	Li attended the China–Japan–South Korea trilateral summit and met with South Korean President Yoon Suk-yeol and Japanese Prime Minister Fumio Kishida.
13–15 June	New Zealand	Wellington; Auckland	Li met with New Zealand Prime Minister Christopher Luxon and Governor-General Cindy Kiro to sign trade and climate change agreements. China agreed to extend visa-free travel to New Zealanders while New Zealand agreed to support Chinese language training and cultural exchange programmes by local Confucius Institutes.
15–18 June	Australia	Adelaide; Canberra; Perth	Li attended a state visit and the 9th China–Australia annual leaders' meeting in Canberra.
18–20 June	Malaysia	Kuala Lumpur; Putrajaya	Li met Malaysian Prime Minister Anwar Ibrahim.
20–22 August	Russia	Moscow	Li met with Russian President Vladimir Putin.
22–23 August	Belarus	Minsk; Smalyavichy	Li met with Belarusian President Alexander Lukashenko.
10–11 September	Saudi Arabia	Riyadh	Li met with Crown Prince and Prime Minister Mohammed bin Salman.
11–13 September	United Arab Emirates	Abu Dhabi	Li met with President Mohamed bin Zayed Al Nahyan.
9–12 October	Laos	Vientiane	Li attended the China-ASEAN Summit in Laos.
12–14 October	Vietnam	Hanoi	Li met with Communist Party General Secretary and President Tô Lâm and Prime Minister Phạm Minh Chính.
14–16 October	Pakistan	Islamabad	First Premier of China to visit Pakistan, since 2013. Attended 2024 Islamabad SCO summit. Held meetings with President of Pakistan Asif Ali Zardari and Prime Minister Shehbaz Sharif, signed multiple agreements. Also met Prime Minister of Russia Mikhail Mishustin and Prime Minister of Mongolia Luvsannamsrain Oyun-Erdene.

== 2025 ==
Dates	Country	Locations	Details
24–26 June	Indonesia	Jakata	Li visited Jakarta, Indonesia
26–28 June	Malaysia	Kuala Lumpur; Putrajaya	Li met with Malaysian Prime Minister Anwar Ibrahim. He attended the ASEAN-China-GCC Summit.
4–5 July	Greece	Rhodes	Technical stop. Li met with Greek Deputy Prime Minister Kostis Hatzidakis.
5–8 July	Brazil	Rio de Janeiro	Li attended the 17th BRICS summit.
9–10 July	Egypt	Cairo	At the invitation of Egyptian Prime Minister Mostafa Madbouly, Li paid an official visit to Egypt.
22–26 September	United States	New York City	Li attended the general debate of the eightieth session of the United Nations General Assembly and the High-level Meeting on Global Development Initiatives hosted by China.
9–11 October	North Korea	Pyongyang	Li Qiang attended the 80th anniversary celebrations of the Workers' Party of Korea and paid an official goodwill visit from October 9 to 11. Li also met with General Secretary Kim Jong Un.
25–26 October	Singapore		
27–28 October	Malaysia	Kuala Lumpur	
17–18 November	Russia	Moscow	Li attended the 24th meeting of the Council of Heads of Government of the Shanghai Cooperation Organisation (SCO) member states in Russia.
19–20 November	Zambia	Lusaka	Official visit.
21–23 November	South Africa	Johannesburg	Li attended the 20th G20 Summit in South Africa.

== 2026 ==
Dates	Country	Locations	Details
17–18 October	Uzbekistan	Tashkent	Official visit.
18–20 October	Tajikistan	Dushanbe	Official visit. Li attended the 25th meeting of the Council of Heads of Government of the Shanghai Cooperation Organisation (SCO) member states in Tajikistan.
20–22 October	Russia	Saint Petersburg Moscow	Li attended the 31st regular meeting between the Chinese and Russian prime ministers. He also met with Russian president Vladimir Putin.
15–16 November	Philippines	Manila	Attended the 29th ASEAN-China Summit.

== Future trips ==
Country	Location	Date	Details
Australia	Sydney Canberra Brisbane Perth Darwin	Dec 2026	State Visit
