= Busan Summit =

2025 China–United States meeting in South Korea

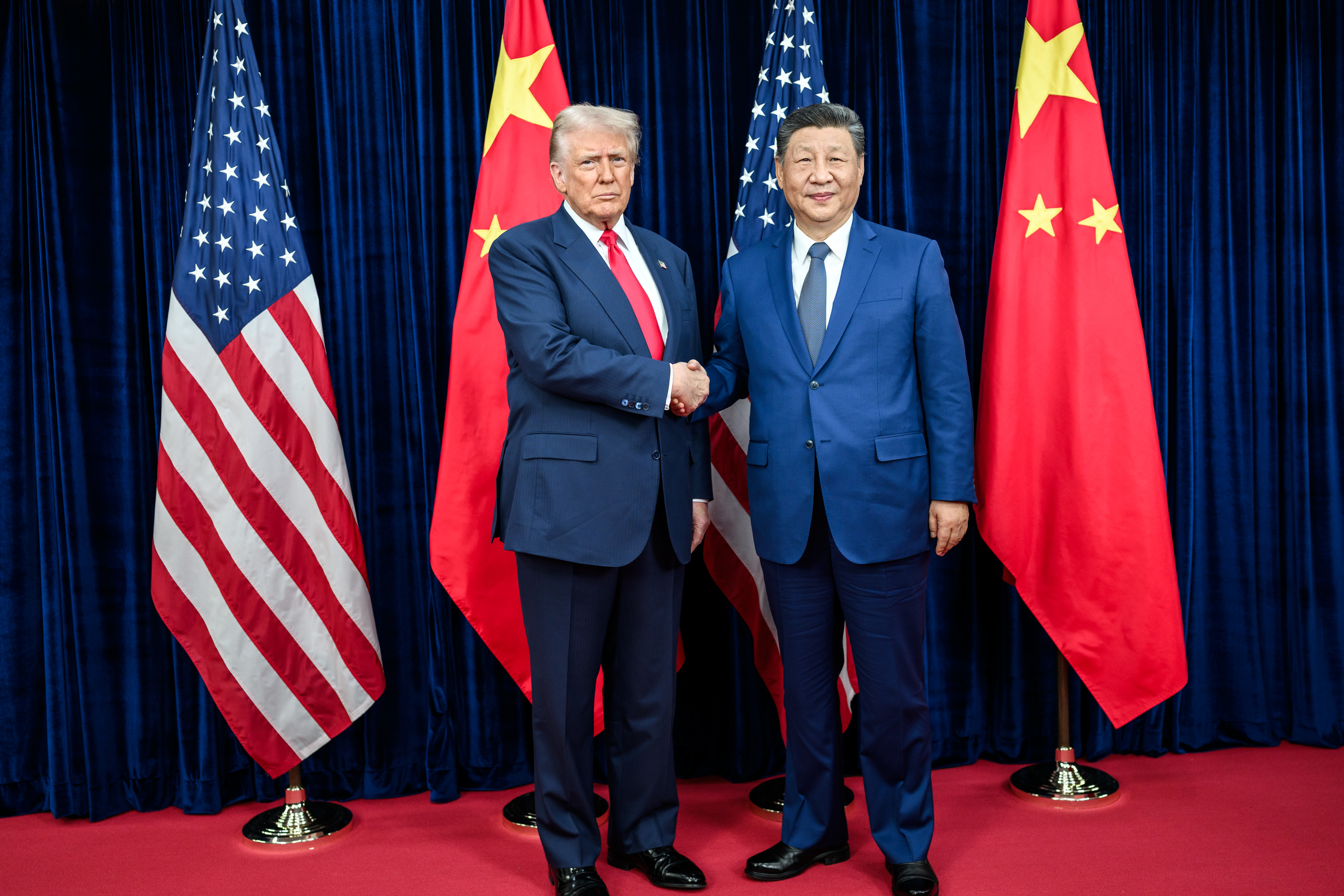
- Host country: South Korea
- Date: 30 October 2025
- Cities: Busan
- Participants: (China) Xi Jinping (United States) Donald Trump

The Busan Summit was a summit meeting held on 30 October 2025, in Busan, South Korea, between Chinese leader Xi Jinping and United States President Donald Trump. This was the first face-to-face meeting between the two leaders in six years since the 2019 G20 Osaka summit. The meeting aimed to manage differences and explore the possibility of setting a future direction for China–United States relations amid the ongoing tensions in bilateral relations caused by the China–United States trade war and high-tech competition. The meeting was held at the VIP building at Gimhae International Airport, during the APEC South Korea.

On the eve of the summit, which was considered "high-risk", the relationship was under pressure from multiple fronts, especially as the trade truce agreement reached by the two sides in May 2025 that was set to expire on 10 November, Before the meeting, friction between the two countries escalated again: the United States restricted exports of semiconductor products that are crucial to the development of artificial intelligence to China, while China expanded export controls on rare earth metals which are core components of the defense industry and high-tech applications. Trump threatened to impose an additional 100% punitive tariff on Chinese goods starting 1 November. Despite the tense situation, the trade delegations of both sides held negotiations in Kuala Lumpur, Malaysia before the meeting and said that they had achieved a "very successful framework" and "preliminary consensus".

The formal talks lasted about one hour and forty minutes, during which the two leaders agreed to take several measures to ease short-term trade tensions. Xi said at the meeting that the two sides had reached a "basic consensus" on trade negotiations. He stressed that friction between the two major economies is a normal phenomenon and called on both sides to avoid falling into a "vicious cycle of mutual retaliation". The main outcomes of the meeting focused on tariffs and controls. The U.S. agreed to reduce the average tariff rate on Chinese imports from 57% to 47%, with the punitive tariffs on fentanyl-related products reduced from 20% to 10%, and pledged to suspend the imposition of retaliatory tariffs on Chinese goods for one year. In exchange, the U.S. and China agreed to suspend export controls on rare earth and high-tech products for one year, and the U.S. would also suspend its Section 301 investigations into China's maritime, logistics and shipbuilding industries. In terms of trade and cooperation, China pledged to immediately and substantially resume imports of soybeans and other agricultural products from the United States; the two sides also agreed to strengthen cooperation in the fight against fentanyl. Trump announced that he would visit China in May 2026, while invited Xi to visit the United States in September of that year in return.

== Background ==
The summit was held against the backdrop of continued high tensions between China and the United States. Months before the meeting, relations between the two largest economies in the world had been strained by trade war and technological competition. The two sides took a series of escalating measures: the United States restricted exports of semiconductor products and key software that are crucial to the development of artificial intelligence. In response, China expanded export controls on rare earth metals, which are core to the defense industry and high-tech applications. Such frictions led to the two countries imposing retaliatory tariffs on each other multiple times that year, with some goods even subject to tariffs of more than 100%.

The talks, which are considered high-risk, face two pressing time constraints: first, the trade truce agreement signed in May 2025 would expire on 10 November; second, US President Donald Trump threatened to impose an additional 100% punitive tariff on Chinese goods starting 1 November if the talks fail to make substantial progress.

In terms of bargaining power, China had several advantages, including its position as the core of global manufacturing, its dominance in the rare earth market, and its huge purchasing power for US agricultural products (especially soybeans). In contrast, the main leverage of the United States comes from its technology embargo on high-end semiconductor and wafer manufacturing equipment to China, as well as the threat of continued tariff increases.

Prior to the meeting between the two heads of state, trade delegations from both sides held two days of emergency consultations in Kuala Lumpur, Malaysia, from 26 to 27 October and reached a "preliminary consensus" on the framework of a trade agreement. Both sides described the outcome as a "very successful framework".

On the morning of 30 October, the day before the formal talks began, President Trump issued a military directive. He issued a statement through the Truth Social, instructing the U.S. military to immediately resume nuclear weapons testing. In the statement, Trump pointed out that Russia has the second largest nuclear arsenal after the United States, while China is "far behind, ranking third". He said that given that other countries are advancing their own nuclear testing programs, he has instructed the U.S. Department of Defense to restart U.S. nuclear weapons testing on a reciprocal basis.

== Summit ==
The meeting between the Chinese and US leaders was held at 11:00 a.m. Korean Standard Time on 30 October at the VIP building of Gimhae International Airport and lasted for about one hour and forty minutes. Both leaders led high-level delegations to the meeting. The US delegation included Secretary of State Marco Rubio, Treasury Secretary Scott Bessent, Trade Representative Jamieson Greer, Secretary of Commerce Howard Lutnick, US Ambassador to China David Perdue, and White House Chief of Staff Susie Wiles. The Chinese officials present included Central Foreign Affairs Office Director Wang Yi, Communist Party General Office Director Cai Qi, Vice Premier He Lifeng, Minister of Commerce Wang Wentao, Vice Minister of Foreign Affairs Ma Zhaoxu and National Development and Reform Commission Chairman Zheng Shanjie.

At the start of the talks, Trump described Xi Jinping as a "very tough negotiating opponent." Xi Jinping responded through a translator that friction between the world's two largest economies is a normal phenomenon, and pointed out that the two countries’ economic and trade teams had reached a "basic consensus" on key issues of concern a few days earlier. He added that China's development does not contradict Trump's goal of "making America great again".

The two sides reached several agreements during the talks, mainly focusing on easing trade war tensions and setting a one-year truce. In terms of tariffs, the United States agreed to reduce the average tariff rate on Chinese imports from 57% to 47% and to reduce tariffs on Chinese goods related to fentanyl from 20% to 10%. In addition, the United States pledged to suspend the 24% equivalent tariff imposed on Chinese goods for one year and to suspend the Section 301 investigation measures against China's maritime, logistics and shipbuilding industries for one year.

As a reciprocal arrangement, China and the United States agreed to suspend the implementation of export control measures related to high technology and rare earths for one year. Specifically, the United States will suspend the implementation of 50% of the "penetration rule" in export control, while China will suspend the implementation of rare earth export restrictions. As a gesture of goodwill and part of the agreement, China pledged to immediately and on a large scale resume purchasing U.S. soybeans and other agricultural products. In terms of cooperation, the two sides agreed to strengthen cooperation in the fight against fentanyl, and Trump said he believed that Xi Jinping would "do everything in his power to stop" fentanyl from flowing into the United States. In addition, the two countries also agreed to properly handle the TikTok -related disputes.

After the meeting, both sides agreed to maintain regular exchanges. Trump announced plans to visit China in April of the following year and invited Xi Jinping to visit the United States at an appropriate time. The White House said it hoped that the two leaders would hold several meetings in the coming year. However, despite the focus on trade and economic cooperation, several sensitive geopolitical issues were not addressed. For example, despite rumors that Trump had received a verbal assurance from Xi Jinping that China would not take military action against Taiwan during his term, Trump told reporters after the meeting that the Taiwan issue was "not mentioned at all" during the talks. In addition, the joint communiqué did not mention the Russo-Ukrainian war.

After his meeting with Xi Jinping, Trump did not answer questions or make comments from the media present. He then boarded Air Force One, accompanied by South Korean Foreign Minister Cho Tae-yul and South Korean Ambassador to the United States Kang Kyung-wha, and immediately departed for Washington, D.C. When interviewed by reporters on Air Force One, Trump expressed his high satisfaction with the summit's outcome, describing the meeting as "if I were to rate it from 0 to 10... I would say it was a 12." He also said that he was too busy to meet with North Korean leader Kim Jong Un, but said "I will come back and talk to Kim Jong Un."

After the summit, Xi Jinping immediately left Gimhae International Airport by special car and went to Gyeongju, North Gyeongsang Province to attend the APEC summit. He then continued his state visit to South Korea, lasted until 1 November. During his visit to South Korea, Xi Jinping attended the 32nd APEC Leaders' Informal Meeting. This was his first state visit to South Korea in 11 years since July 2014.

== Aftermath ==
After the news of the agreement reached between the Chinese and American heads of state was announced, the global financial market reacted positively. Asian and American stock markets generally rose sharply, with the Shanghai Stock Exchange Composite Index, the South Korean stock market, the Japanese stock market and the Taiwan stock market all hitting new highs on the same day. At the same time, the central parity rate of the Renminbi against the US dollar rose significantly, climbing to the highest level of the year.

The summit was followed by an overall improvement of relations between China and the United States, with President Trump adopting a more conciliatory policy towards China. Since the meeting, the Trump administration has frozen several actions that could damage its relationship with China including imposing tariffs on strategic sectors, penalizing Chinese companies deemed to be security risks to the U.S., curbed investigations into China-linked hackers and lessened scrutiny on Chinese investments, while telling officials to tone down their statements towards China.

== See also ==
- List of international presidential trips made by Donald Trump
- List of international trips made by Xi Jinping
