= 2017 Astana SCO summit =

2017 SCO summit
- Host country: Kazakhstan
- Date: 7-10 June 2017
- Cities: Astana

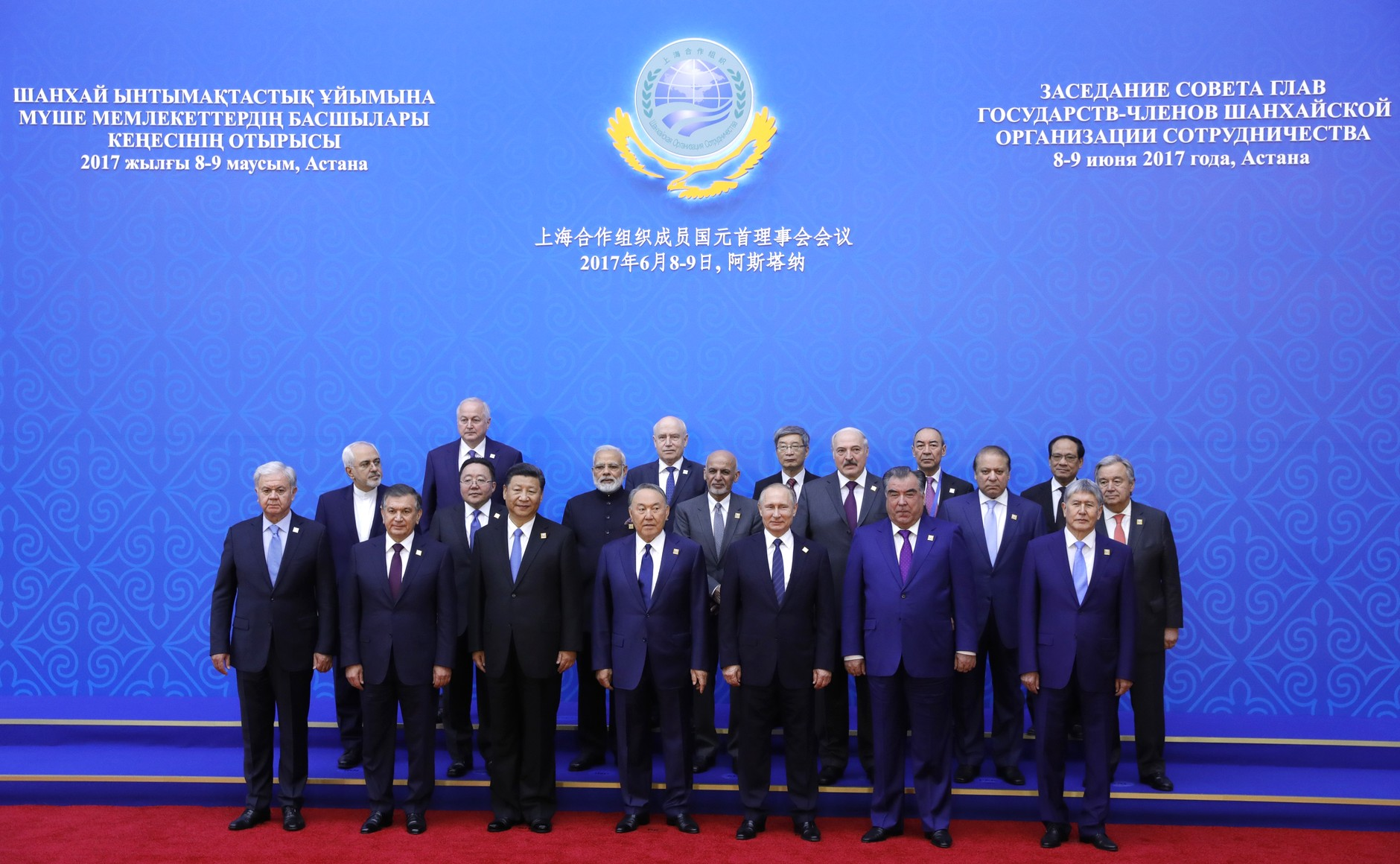
Participants in the SCO Council of Heads of State meeting in expanded format

The 2017 SCO summit was the 17th annual summit of heads of state of the Shanghai Cooperation Organisation held between 7 - 10 June in Astana, Kazakhstan. The upgrading of the membership of India and Pakistan to full members was one of the major topics, beside from security related topics, the Belt and Road Initiative and economic cooperation.

== Background ==
On 21 April 2017 the foreign ministers met in Astana to prepare the meeting. The summit was planned to be before the opening of the Expo 2017, which also takes place in Astana.

== India and Pakistan acceptance ==
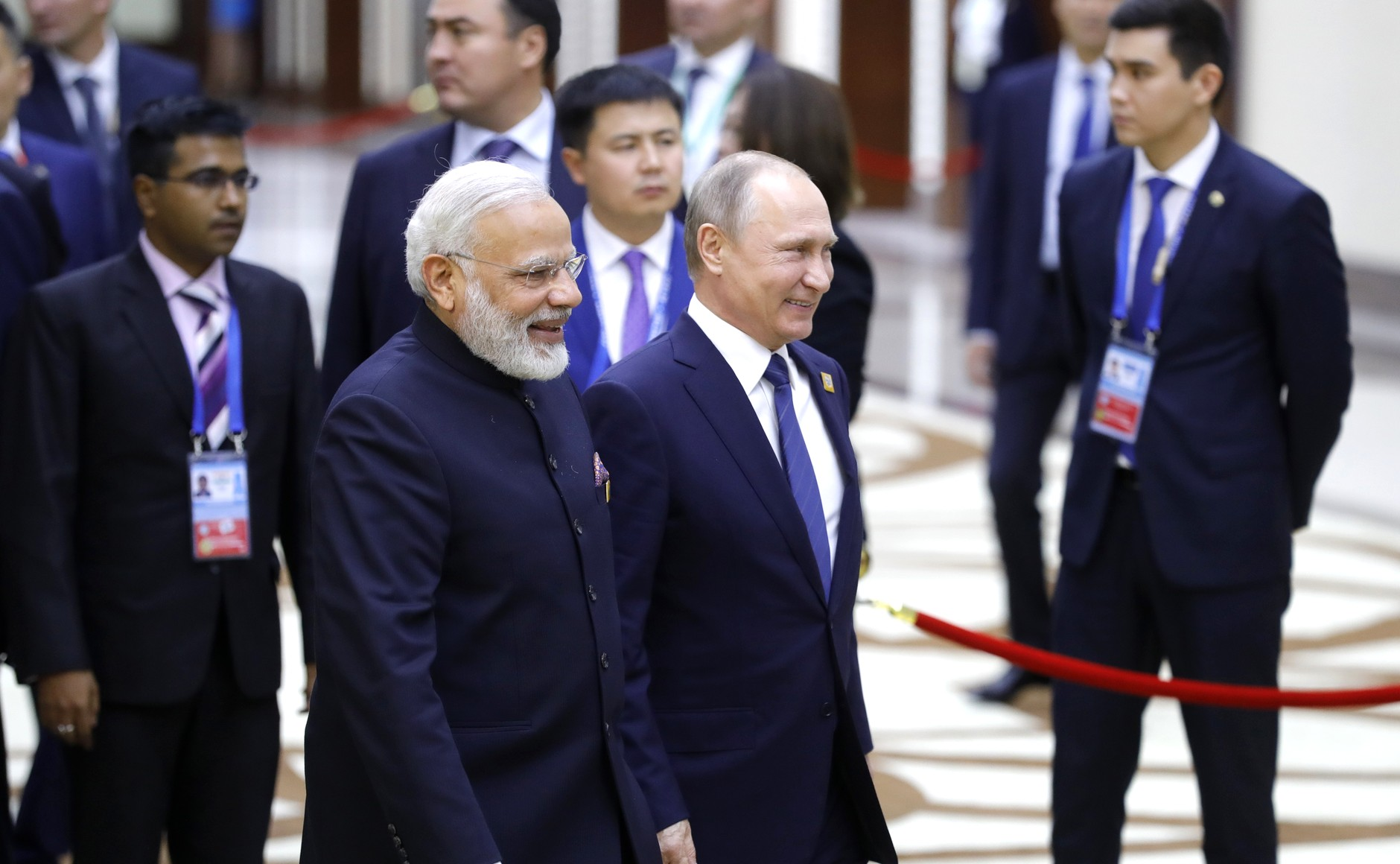
Indian Prime Minister Narendra Modi and Russian President Vladimir Putin at the 2017 SCO summit in Astana

The acceptance of India and Pakistan to the Shanghai Cooperation Organization was the first since 2001. This makes the SCO the largest and most populous international regional cooperation organization.

== Belt and Road initiative ==
The summit in Astana was the first state visit of General Secretary of the Chinese Communist Party Xi Jinping after the Belt and Road Forum in Beijing. The linking of SCO to the initiative was a major concern of the Chinese government. With Pakistan on a strategic position of the New Silk Road, the summit was thought to have a positive effect on further developments. Also the Belt and Road Initiative was also first proposed by Xi Jinping in Kazakhstan in 2013.

== Security issues and anti-terrorism ==
One of the major tasks of the SCO is the combat against terrorism, which is believed to be strengthened through the acceptance of the new members.

== See also ==
- Belt and Road Initiative
- Expo 2017
