= 2019 state visits by Xi Jinping to Italy and France =

State Visit of Xi Jinping to Italy and France
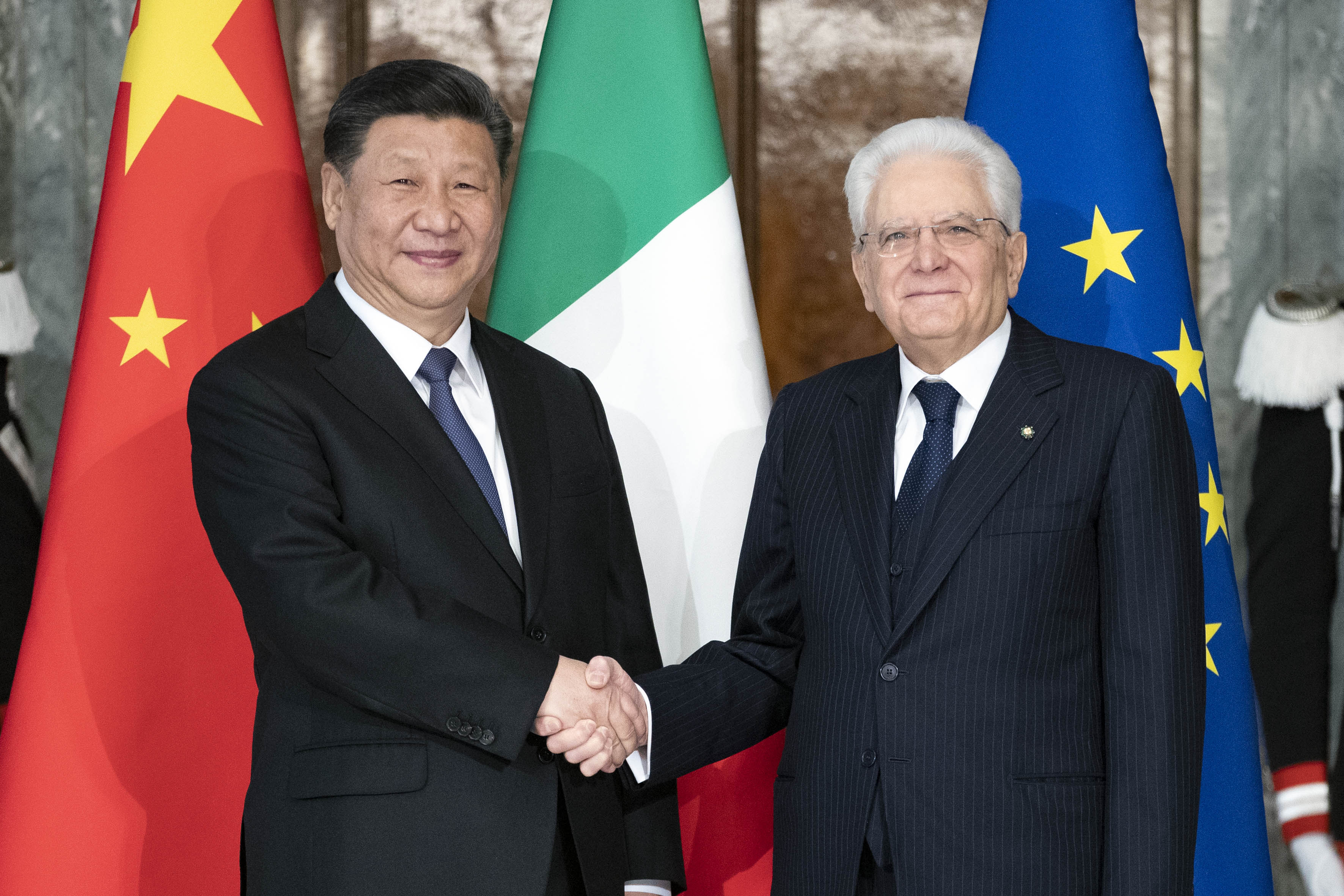
- Italian President Sergio Mattarella with Chinese President Xi Jinping, 22 March 2019.
- Native name: 2019年習近平訪問意大利和法國
- Date: 21–26 March 2019
- Venue: Rome, Nice and Paris
- Organised by: Government of Italy; Government of France; Government of China

Xi Jinping's visit to Italy and France was a state visit of President and General Secretary Xi Jinping of China to Italy and France from 21–26 March 2019. It was his second trip to the Southern European region in five months, the first state visit to Italy and France in 10 and 5 years respectively and his first foreign trip of 2019. It also coincided with the 55th anniversary of the establishment of China-France relations in 1964. During the visits, Xi met with Emmanuel Macron and Giuseppe Conte, the President of France and Prime Minister of Italy respectively. The two visits were part of a bigger European trip by Xi which also included a visit to Monaco to meet with Albert II, Prince of Monaco. A topic that came up in both visits was the Belt and Road Initiative.

== Italy visit ==
=== First day (21 March) ===
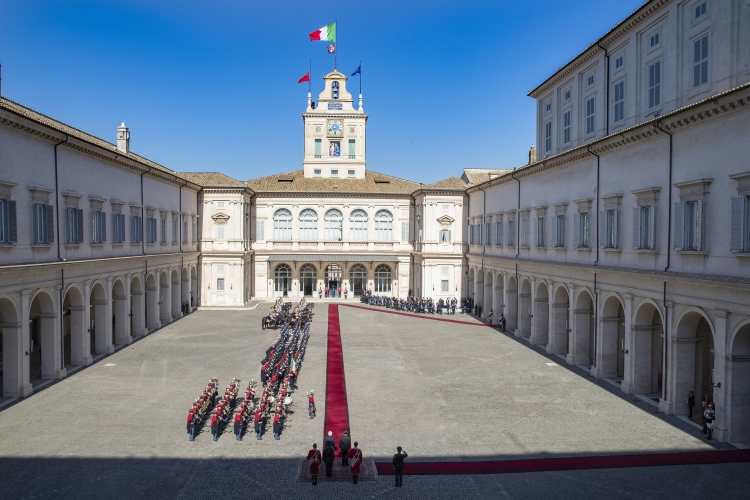
The arrival ceremony at the Quirinale.

Xi and his wife Peng Liyuan arrived at Leonardo da Vinci–Fiumicino Airport in the early hours of 21 March. Xi was welcomed with honors by President Sergio Mattarella at the Quirinal Palace, which included an inspection of Italian Army Band Rome, a tri-service honour guard and a mounted Corazzieri formation. After the welcoming ceremony, the two held bilateral talks in a one-on-one and expanded format. During their talks, they agreed. Following their meeting, Xi went to the Altare della Patria to lay a wreath at the Tomb of the Unknown Soldier. He then held talks with Chamber of Deputies President Roberto Fico and Senate President Elisabetta Casellati.

=== Second day (22 March) ===
The next day, President Xi and President Mattarella took part in the Italy-China Business Forum, the Italian-Chinese Cultural Forum and of the Italy-China Cooperation Forum in Third Countries. They then held a joint press conference at the Quirinale.

He then took part in an arrival ceremony at the Villa Madama by the Arma dei Carabinieri with Prime Minister Conte later in the day. The two countries then signed a memorandum on the advancement of the Belt and Road Initiative. At the end of the talks, a signing ceremony of the agreements and the agreements between Italian and Chinese ministers, officials, and businessmen took place.

The list of documents signed included the following:

- Joint press statement
- Memorandum of Understanding in the area of the Economic Silk Road and the Maritime Silk Road Initiative
- Memorandum of Understanding between the Government of China and the Government of Italy
- Institutional agreements
- Commercial agreements

The 29 deals that were signed were worth more than 7 billion euros.

In the evening, President Mattarella held a state dinner in honor of President Xi and his wife Peng Liyuan. After the dinner, a concert involving Italian singer and songwriter Andrea Bocelli took place.

=== Third day (23 March) ===
Xi left for Monte Carlo, Monaco on the afternoon of 23 March. He was given a farewell ceremony outside the Quirinale by the Italian Armed Forces and was seen off by President Matarella.

== France visit ==
While en route to Paris from Monaco, Xi stopped in the evening of 24 March to the resort city of Nice to meet with President Macron and his wife Brigitte Macron. The two brought their spouses to the seaside village of Beaulieu-sur-Mer, where they dined that night.

=== First Day (25 March) ===
The next morning, Xi and Macron went to the Arc de Triomphe in Paris to attend a welcoming ceremony and a wreath laying ceremony. During the ceremony, Xi met with French war veterans and signed his name in the guest book. Honors were rendered by a quad-service honour guard and the French Republican Guard Band. The two held talks inside the Elysee Palace, before attending the signing of bilateral agreements. 15 commercial agreements were signed, including a $34 billion between the China Aviation Supplies Holding Company (CASC) and European aerospace corporation Airbus. Deals were also signed between various energy corporations and shipping lines.

On 25 March, Xi was honoured with a state dinner at the Elysee Palace by President Macron. Guests included French actor Alain Delon, French-Chinese painter Yan Pei-Ming and Chinese actress Gong Li.

=== Second day (26 March) ===
Aside from Macron, he also held talks with German Chancellor Angela Merkel and President of the European Commission Jean-Claude Juncker, both in separate and quadrilateral meetings. Topics that were discussed included the Joint Comprehensive Plan of Action (JCPOA), the 2018–19 Korean peace process, multilateralism, and the joint efforts to develop the African continent. After the meeting, Xi was seen off by President Macron at the Elysee before headed to his Beijing-bound plane at Charles de Gaulle Airport.

== See also ==
- China–Italy relations
- China–France relations
- List of international trips made by Xi Jinping
