= State visits by Xi Jinping to Russia, Tanzania, South Africa, and Congo =

Xi's first foreign visit as Paramount leader (November 2012)

State visit by Xi Jinping to Russia, Tanzania, South Africa and Congo
- Date: March 22-30, 2013
- Venue: Moscow, Dar es Salaam, Pretoria and Brazzaville
- Organised by: Government of Russian Federation; Government of Tanzania; Government of South Africa; Government of the Republic of the Congo; Government of China

At the invitation of President of the Russian Federation Vladimir Putin, President of the United Republic of Tanzania Jakaya Kikwete, President of the Republic of South Africa Jacob Zuma and President of the Republic of the Congo Denis Sassou Nguesso, the President of China and General Secretary of the Chinese Communist Party Xi Jinping left Beijing on the morning of March 22 to pay a state visit to these four countries and attend the 5th BRICS summit held in Durban, South Africa. The trip is also Xi's first foreign state visit since he became the Paramount leader of China in November 2012.

== Meetings ==
=== Russia ===
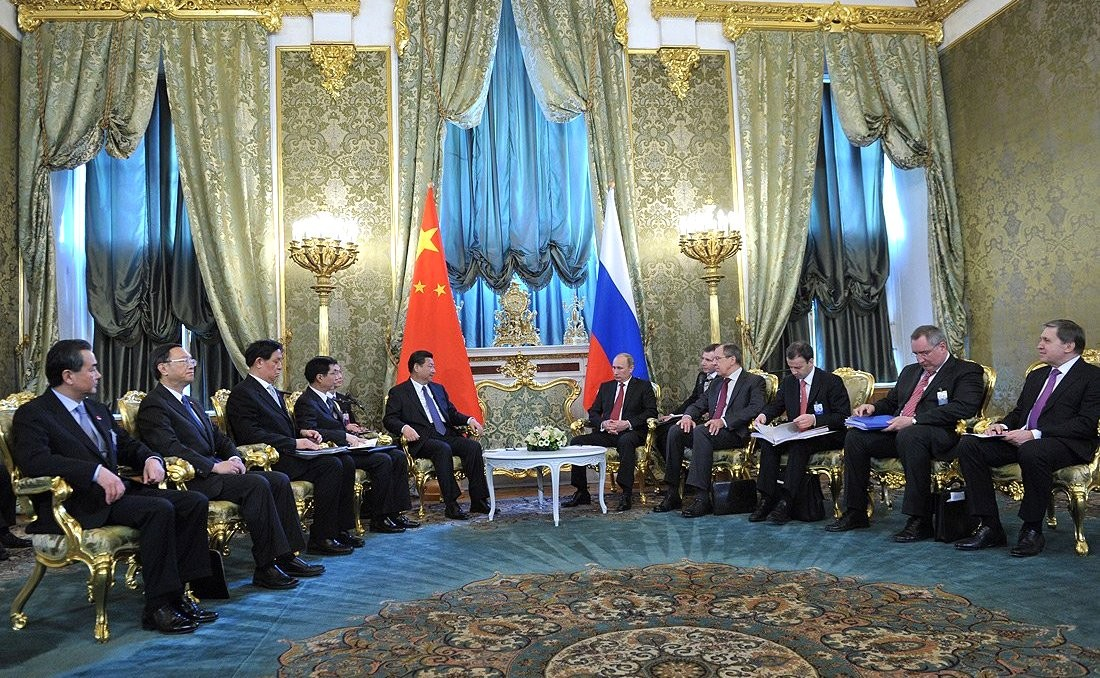
Symposium of the Russian delegation of China prior to the official meeting

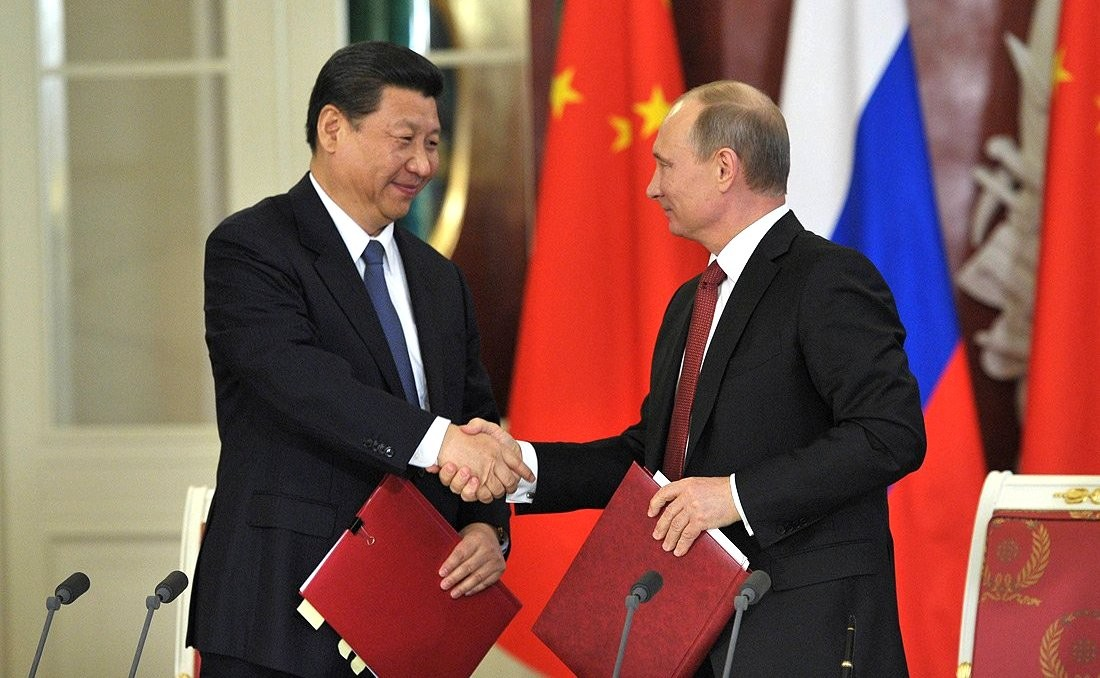
Vladimir Putin and Xi Jinping concluded their talks by approving a joint declaration

On March 22, the Paramount leader of China Xi Jinping arrived at Moscow's Vnukovo International Airport to begin his state visit to Russia. Ministry for the Development of the Russian Far East and Arctic Viktor Ishayev greeted him at the airport, as did the Vice Premier of the State Council Wang Yang, State Councillor and Minister of National Defense Chang Wanquan, and Ambassador of the People's Republic of China to the Russian Federation Li Hui, who had arrived in the country to attend the activities related to Xi Jinping's visit to the Russian Federation. Wang Huning, Li Zhanshu and Yang Jiechi arrived on the same flight. Russia is the first country Xi visited after assuming the presidency.

On March 22, President Xi held talks with President of Russia Vladimir Putin in the Moscow Kremlin. The two heads of state had an in-depth exchange of views on China-Russia relations and major international and regional issues, and reached an important consensus on strengthening China-Russia all-round strategic cooperation. After the talks, the two heads of state signed the Joint Declaration of the People's Republic of China and the Russian Federation on Win-Win Cooperation and Deepening of Comprehensive Strategic Collaborative Partnership and witnessed the signing ceremony of a number of documents on cooperation between the two governments and enterprises, covering such areas as facilitating people-to-people exchanges, combating illegal migration, energy, ecology and environmental protection, humanities, local cooperation, financial investment and infrastructure construction.

On the evening of March 22, the opening ceremony of the Year of China Tourism in Russia was solemnly held in the Kremlin in Moscow, with President Xi Jinping and Russian President Vladimir Putin attending and delivering speeches.

On March 23, President Xi Jinping met with Valentina Matviyenko, the Chairman of the Russian Federation Council, Sergey Naryshkin, the Chairman of the State Duma, and Prime Minister of Russia Dmitry Medvedev in Moscow. President Xi also attended a ceremony in Moscow to launch the construction of a memorial to the 6th National Congress of the Chinese Communist Party. Deputy Prime Minister of the Russian Federation Olga Golodets was present.

=== Tanzania ===
On March 24, President Xi arrived at Julius Nyerere International Airport to begin a state visit to Tanzania. President of Tanzania Jakaya Kikwete and his wife greeted Xi and his wife Peng Liyuan at the airport. This is Xi's first visit to Africa after assuming the presidency. President Xi Jinping visited the Chinese Experts Cemetery in Dar es Salaam to pay tribute to more than 60 Chinese experts, technicians and workers who died on duty during the construction of the TAZARA Railway.

In the afternoon, President Xi arrived at the presidential palace, and President Kikwete came to the courtyard gate of the presidential palace to greet him warmly. The two heads of state decided to carry on the traditional friendship between China and Tanzania, build and develop a mutually beneficial and win-win comprehensive partnership, and elevate China-Tanzania relations to a higher level. After the talks, the two heads of state attended a signing ceremony for a number of documents on cooperation between the two countries in the fields of trade, financial investment, infrastructure construction and culture.

=== South Africa ===
On March 25, President Xi arrived in Pretoria to begin his state visit to South Africa, where he was warmly greeted at the airport by South Africa's Minister of International Relations and Cooperation Maite Nkoana-Mashabane and Minister of Public Enterprises Malusi Gigaba.

On March 26, President Xi held talks with President of South Africa Jacob Zuma in Pretoria. The two heads of state discussed in depth the development of China-South Africa relations from the strategic perspective of promoting the development of China-Africa relations and promoting solidarity and cooperation among developing countries, and reached an important consensus. After the talks, the two heads of state attended the signing ceremony of a number of cooperation documents in the fields of economy and trade, finance and investment, energy and mining, culture and education, and infrastructure construction.

On March 26-27, the leaders of Brazil, Russia, India, China and South Africa met in Durban, South Africa for the 5th BRICS summit.

=== Republic of Congo ===
On March 29, President Xi met with the President Denis Sassou Nguesso and the two heads of state agreed to establish a comprehensive partnership of solidarity and mutual assistance between China and Congo on the basis of the traditional friendship between the two countries. During the visit, President Xi Jinping and President Sassou attended the completion ceremony of the China-Congo Friendship Hospital (formerly known as Mfiru Hospital) and the inauguration ceremony of the library of the Marien Ngouabi University and the "China Pavilion" therein.

At noon on March 30, President Xi led the delegation out of Brazzaville, leaving with a send-off ceremony at the airport by President Denis Sassou Nguesso of the Republic of Congo. On the morning of March 31, they returned to Beijing.

== See also ==
- 5th BRICS summit
- List of international trips made by Xi Jinping
