= Suez Canal Economic Zone =

- الهيئة العامة للمنطقة الاقتصادية لقناة السويس

Agency overview
- Formed: 2015
- Jurisdiction: Government of Egypt
- Website: sczone.eg

The Suez Canal Economic Zone (SCEZ) is a special economic zone located in Egypt, established in 2015 with the aim of promoting economic growth and attracting foreign investment to the country. The zone encompasses an area of over 461 square kilometers and is located along the eastern and western banks of the Suez Canal.

== History ==
The concept of the Suez Canal Economic Zone was first proposed by Egyptian President Abdel Fattah el-Sisi in August 2014, as a part of his broader vision for economic development in Egypt. The zone was officially established in September 2015, with issuing of Decree no. 330 of 2015.

== Geography ==
The Suez Canal Economic Zone spans an area of over 460.6 square kilometers, encompassing both the eastern and western banks of the Suez Canal. The zone is strategically located at the intersection of major international shipping routes, providing easy access to global markets.

== Economy ==
The Suez Canal Economic Zone aims to promote economic growth in Egypt by attracting foreign investment and facilitating the development of new industries.

== Infrastructure ==
The Suez Canal Economic Zone is home to a range of world-class infrastructure, a new major expressway linking East Port Said to the regional network, Six new road and rail tunnels to increase cross-canal connectivity, Seven underwater tunnels under the Canal to link Sinai Peninsula to Egypt's mainland, Power, water and telecommunications networks to support integrated development, and Dry port projects at Ismailia and 10th Ramadan to boost the region's logistical capacity. Intentions to build nine factories and two service centres were announced in a visit by the Egyptian Prime Minister Mustafa Madbouly in March 2025.
