= 2024 Islamabad SCO summit =

Diplomatic event in Pakistan

SCO Islamabad Summit 2024
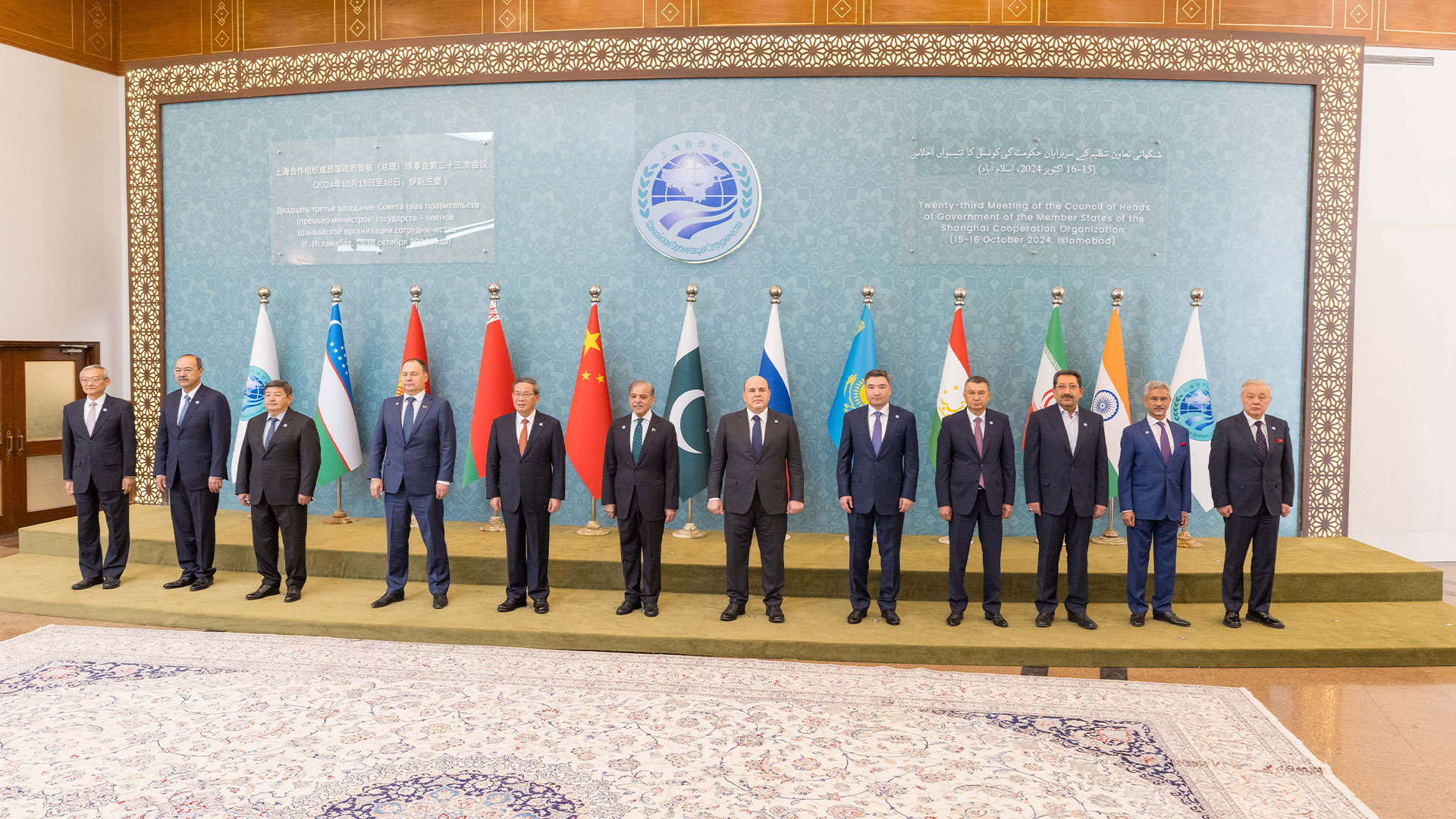
- Group photo of the summit
- Host country: Pakistan
- Date: 15-16 October 2024
- Cities: Islamabad
- Participants: Uzbekistan Russia; China; India; Pakistan; Kazakhstan; Kyrgyzstan; Tajikistan; Belarus; Iran Mongolia Turkmenistan
- Chair: Shehbaz Sharif
- Follows: 2024 SCO summit
- Website: sectsco.org

The SCO Islamabad Summit 2024 was the 23rd annual Council of Heads of Government (CHG) of the Shanghai Cooperation Organisation held between 15 and 16 October 2024 in Islamabad, Pakistan.

== Member states leaders and other Delegates in attendance ==
The summit saw participation from the following SCO member states, observer states and guests:

The Indian External Affairs Minister S. Jaishankar thanked his counterpart, Pakistani Deputy Prime Minister Ishaq Dar, and the people of Pakistan for the warm reception he received. He acknowledged the significance of his meetings, including face-to-face discussions with Dar during the summit. News reports in the media claimed that Pakistan and India have unofficially agreed to reengage in cricket diplomacy, with the scope and modalities of possible discussions to be determined at a later stage.

=== Member states ===
- Belarus – Prime Minister of Belarus Roman Golovchenko
- China– Premier Li Qiang
- India – Minister of External Affairs S. Jaishankar
- Iran – Ministry of Industry, Mine and Trade Mohammad Atabek
- Kazakhstan – Prime Minister of Kazakhstan Oljhas Bektenov
- Kyrgyzstan – Ministers Cabinet Chairman Akylbek Zhaparov
- Pakistan – Prime Minister of Pakistan Shehbaz Sharif
- Russia – Prime Minister of Russia Mikhail Mishustin
- Tajikistan – Prime Minister of Tajikistan Kokhir Rasulzoda
- Uzbekistan – Prime Minister of Uzbekistan Abdulla Aripov

=== Observer state ===
- Mongolia – Prime Minister of Mongolia Oyun-Erdene Luvsannamsrai

=== Invited guests ===
- Turkmenistan – Deputy Chairman of Cabinet of Ministers Rashid Meredov
- SCO Secretary-General Zhang Ming
- SCO RATS Executive Committee Director Ruslan Mirzayev
- SCO Business Council Chairman of the Board Atif Ikram Shaikh
- SCO Interbank Union Chairman of the Council Marat Yelibayev

== Agenda ==
The summit's agenda focused on enhancing regional cooperation in various fields, including economy, trade, environment, sociology and culture. Important discussions were expected on regional security, economic cooperation and counterterrorism. Leaders reviewed the SCO's performance and made key organizational decisions to enhance cooperation among member countries.
