= 2023 state visit by Xi Jinping to Vietnam =

CCP General Secretary Xi Jinping's visit in 2023

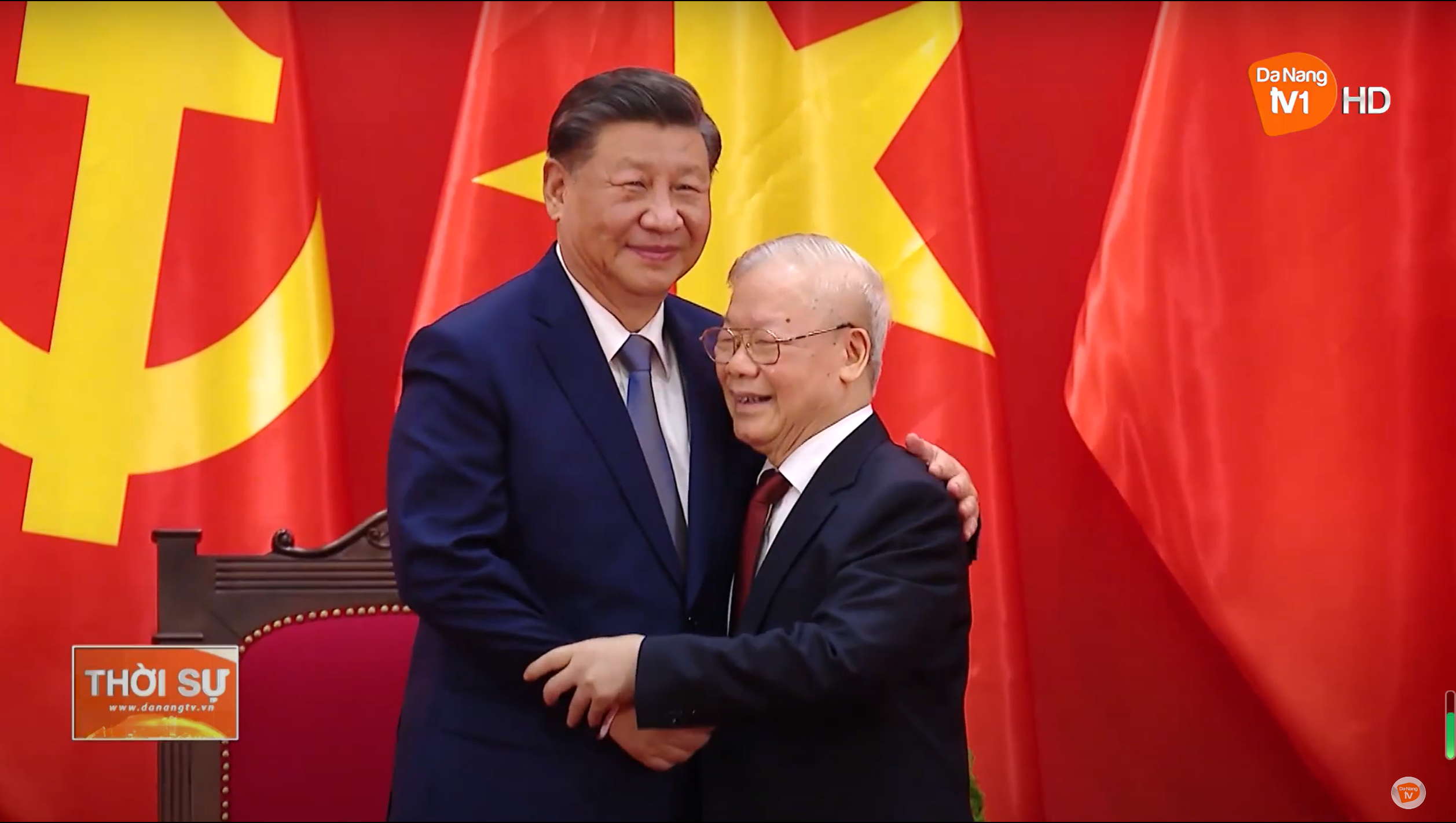
- General Secretary Xi Jinping and General Secretary Nguyễn Phú Trọng on December 13, 2023
- Date: December 12–13, 2023
- Venue: Hanoi
- Organised by: Communist Party of Vietnam; Government of Vietnam; Chinese Communist Party; Government of China

At the invitation of the General Secretary of the Communist Party of Vietnam Nguyễn Phú Trọng and President of Vietnam Võ Văn Thưởng, Xi Jinping, the General Secretary of the Chinese Communist Party and President of China, paid a state visit to Vietnam during December 12–13, 2023. The two sides agreed to issue the Joint Declaration on Further Deepening and Upgrading the Comprehensive Strategic Partnership and Building a Strategic Community of Destiny between China and Vietnam.

== Meetings ==
On December 12, 2023, General Secretary Xi Jinping arrived in Hanoi. the Prime Minister Phạm Minh Chính, member of the Politburo of the Communist Party of Vietnam (CPV), Secretary of the Central Secretariat, Central Minister of Home Affairs Pham Thi Thanh Tra, Secretary of the CPV Central Committee, Minister of External Affairs of the CPV Central Committee Lê Hoài Trung, and other Vietnamese Party and government leaders and local representatives greeted the event.

On the afternoon of December 12, General Secretary Xi Jinping held talks with Nguyễn Phú Trọng, the General Secretary of the Central Committee of the Communist Party of Vietnam (CPV), at the CPV Central Committee's premises. The two sides announced a new positioning of the relationship between the two parties, on the basis of deepening the comprehensive strategic partnership between China and Vietnam, to work together to build a strategic China-Vietnam community of destiny. After the talks, the General Secretaries of the two parties witnessed the display of bilateral cooperation documents signed by the two sides, covering more than 30 areas such as the joint construction of the Belt and Road Initiative, inspection and quarantine, development cooperation, digital economy, green development, transportation, local cooperation, defense and law enforcement security cooperation, maritime cooperation, etc. The two sides agreed to issue the Joint Declaration on Further Deepening and Upgrading the Comprehensive Strategic Partnership and Building a Strategic Community of Destiny between China and Vietnam.

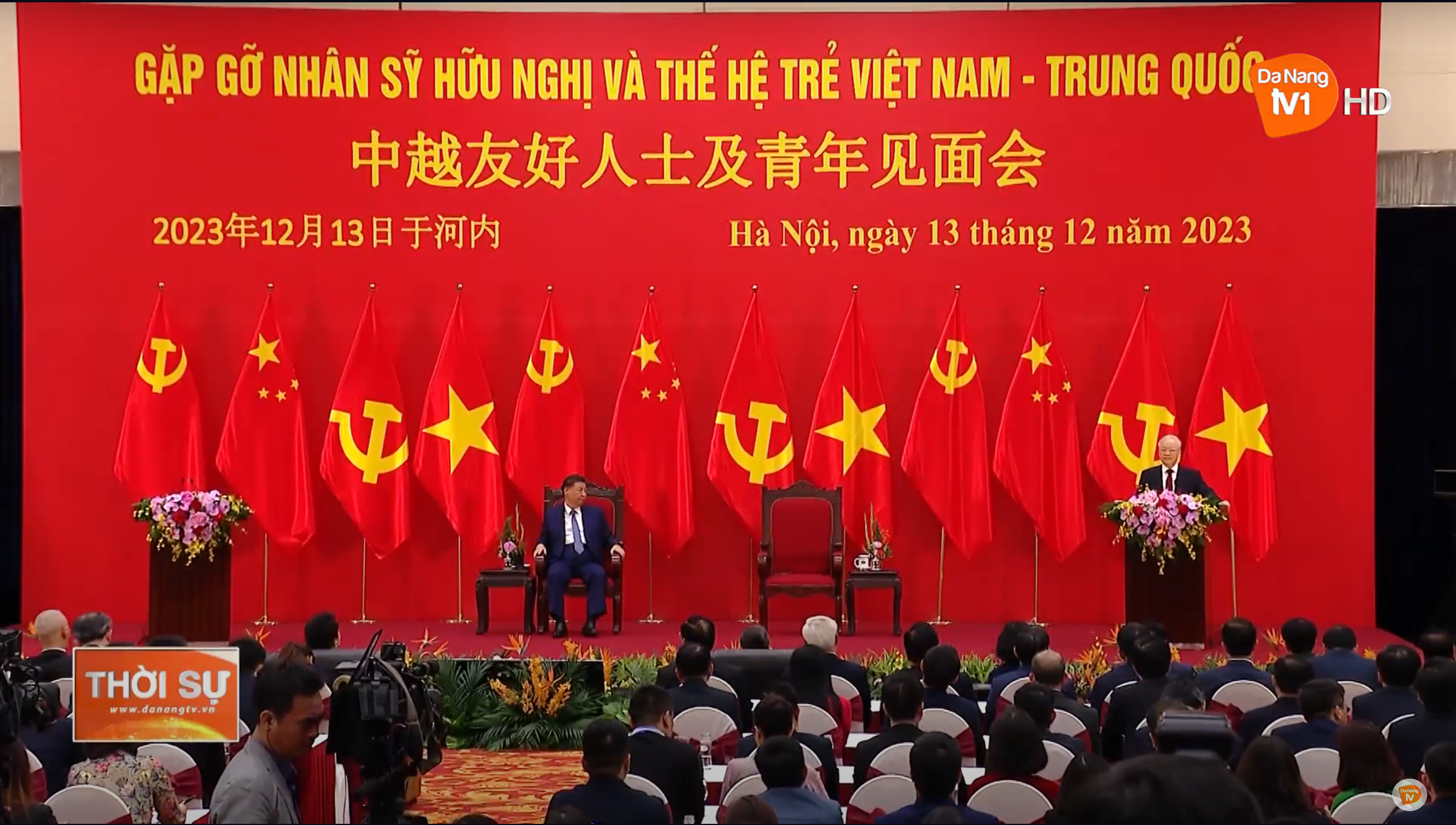
Xi Jinping and Nguyễn Phú Trọng met with representatives of Chinese and Vietnamese youths and friendly people (2023-12-13)

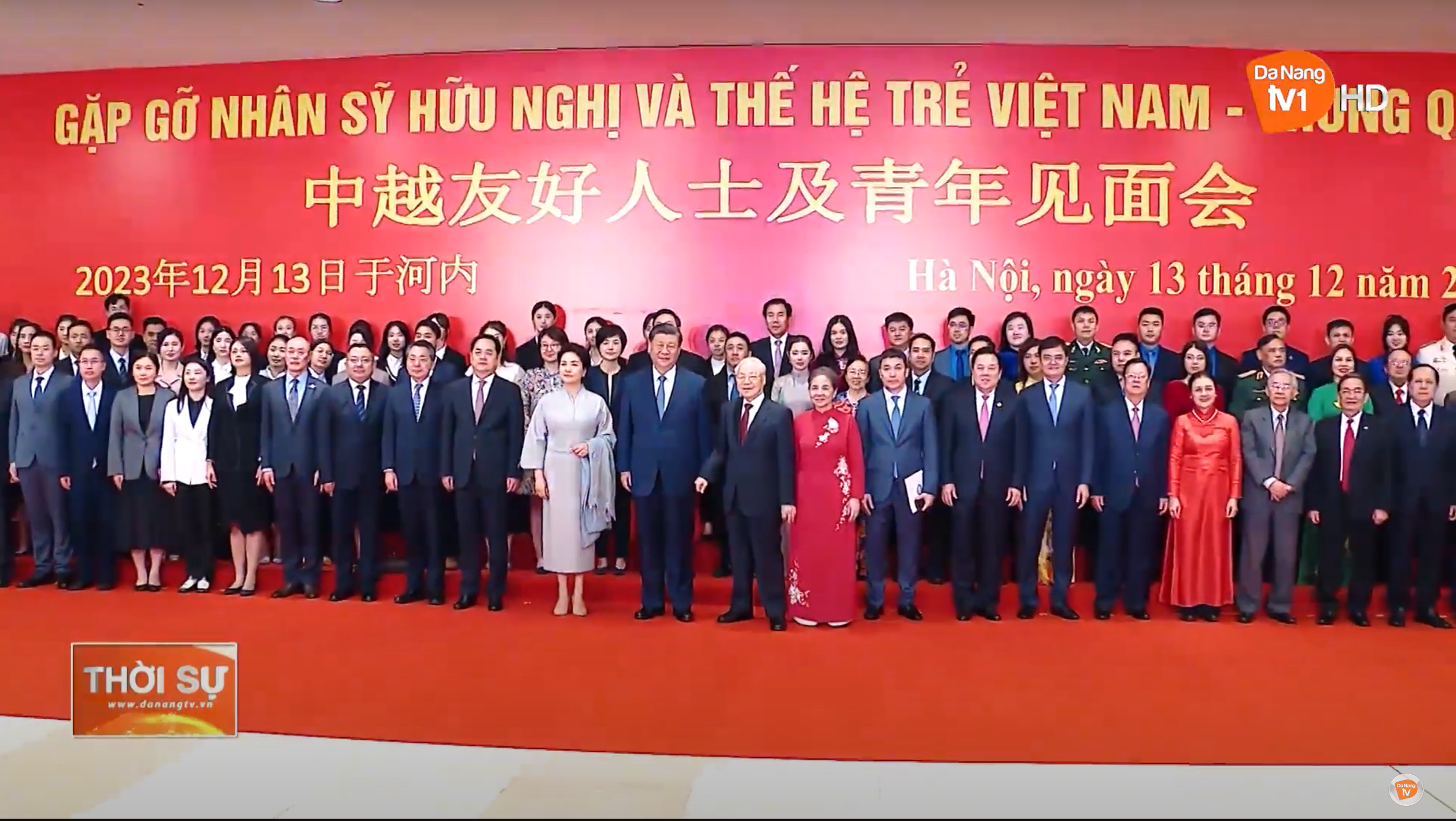
Xi Jinping and Nguyễn Phú Trọng met with representatives of Chinese and Vietnamese youths and friendly people

In the evening, Mr. and Mrs. Nguyễn Phú Trọng, general secretary of the Communist Party of Vietnam Central Committee, and Mr. and Mrs. Võ Văn Thưởng, the President of Vietnam, jointly hosted a grand welcome banquet for Xi and Peng Liyuan. All Vietnam's senior leaders, including members of the Politburo and the Secretariat of the Central Committee of the Communist Party of Vietnam (CPV), accompanied them.

On the morning of December 13, General Secretary Xi Jinping held talks with Vietnamese President Võ Văn Thưởng at the Presidential Palace in Hanoi. General Secretary Xi also met with Vietnamese Prime Minister Phạm Minh Chính and Chairman of the National Assembly of Vietnam Vương Đình Huệ at the Government Residence. In the afternoon, General Secretary Xi Jinping and his wife Peng Liyuan met with representatives of Chinese and Vietnamese youths and friendly people with General Secretary Nguyễn Phú Trọng. Later, General Secretary Xi Jinping led the Chinese delegation to leave Hanoi and return to Beijing.

== Outcomes ==
China and Vietnam signed 37 agreements, including Chinese funding for a cross-border railroad and the holding of joint maritime patrols. The two neighbors also agreed on a three-year plan to boost trade.

China and Vietnam decided to promote cross-border standard railroad connectivity between China and Vietnam, study and promote the construction of the Lao Cai - Hanoi - Haiphong standard railroad in Vietnam and carry out feasibility studies on the Dong Dang - Hanoi and Mang Jie - Ha Long - Haiphong standard railroads in due course. Accelerating the docking of infrastructure construction in border areas, including the construction of China's Damsha-Vietnam's Basha Red River Boundary River Highway Bridge.

== See also ==
- List of international trips made by Xi Jinping
- State visits by Xi Jinping to Vietnam, Malaysia and Cambodia
