= 2022 state visit by Xi Jinping to Kazakhstan and Uzbekistan =

CCP General Secretary Xi Jinping's visit in 2022

- Date: September 14 to 16, 2022
- Venue: Nur-Sultan and Samarkand
- Organised by: Government of Kazakhstan; Government of Uzbekistan; Government of China

From September 14 to 16, 2022, Chinese President and General Secretary of the Chinese Communist Party Xi Jinping attends the 22nd meeting of the Council of Heads of State of the Shanghai Cooperation Organization (SCO) member states in Samarkand, and pay state visits to Kazakhstan and Uzbekistan at the invitation of the Kazakh President Kassym-Jomart Tokayev and Uzbek President Shavkat Mirziyoyev.

Ding Xuexiang, the Secretary of the Secretariat of the CCP Central Committee and Director of the General Office of the CCP Central Committee, Yang Jiechi, Director of the Office of the CCP Central Foreign Affairs Commission, Wang Yi, State Councilor and Minister of Foreign Affairs, He Lifeng, Vice-chairman of the National Committee of the Chinese People's Political Consultative Conference (CPPCC) and the Chairman of the National Development and Reform Commission (NDRC), and other officials arrived on the same flight.

== Meeting ==
=== Kazakhstan ===
On September 14, Xi Jinping arrived in Nur-Sultan. The President of Kazakhstan Kassym-Jomart Tokayev greeted him at the airport.

President Tokaev held a welcoming ceremony for Xi Jinping in the hall of the Presidential Palace of Kazakhstan. Later, President Tokaev invited President Xi to visit the art exhibition "Kazakhstan-China: A Dialogue Across Millennium". The two sides held official talks on the 30th anniversary of the establishment of diplomatic relations between China and Kazakhstan, and signed and issued the Joint Declaration on the 30th Anniversary of the Establishment of Diplomatic Relations between the People's Republic of China and the Republic of Kazakhstan, announcing that they will work for the goals and visions of China and Kazakhstan to build a community of destiny that is characterized by inter-generational friendship, a high degree of mutual trust and solidarity. The relevant departments of the two countries signed a number of bilateral cooperation documents in the fields of economy and trade, connectivity, finance, water conservancy and news media. The two sides decided to open consulates general in Xi'an and Aktobe.

On the afternoon of September 14, Xi Jinping received the Order of the Golden Eagle from President Tokayev of Kazakhstan at the Akorda Residence. After the luncheon, President Xi ended his state visit to Kazakhstan and left Nursultan for Samarkand.

=== Uzbekistan ===
On the evening of September 14, Xi Jinping arrived in Samarkand and was greeted at the airport by Uzbek President Shavkat Mirziyoyev, Government Prime Minister Abdulla Aripov, Foreign Minister Vladimir Norov, Samarkand Governor Erkinjon Turdimov and other senior officials.

On September 15, Xi Jinping met with President Mirziyoyev of Uzbekistan in Samarkand. The two heads of State declared that, with a view to the long-term development of Uzbek relations and the future well-being of the peoples of the two countries, the two sides would expand mutually beneficial cooperation, consolidate their friendship and partnership. After the talks, the two heads of state signed and issued the Joint Declaration of the People's Republic of China and the Republic of Uzbekistan. China and Uzbekistan signed a number of cooperation documents in agriculture, digital economy, green development, culture, localities, media and other fields. During the visit, China, Kyrgyzstan and Uzbekistan signed a Memorandum of Understanding on Cooperation on the China-Kyrgyzstan-Uzbekistan Railway Construction Project (Kyrgyzstan Section). President Xi was awarded the Order of Friendship by President Mirziyoyev of Uzbekistan at the Samarkand International Conference Center.

== See also ==
- 2022 SCO summit
