= 2024 Astana SCO summit =

Annual summit in Kazakhstan

2024 SCO summit
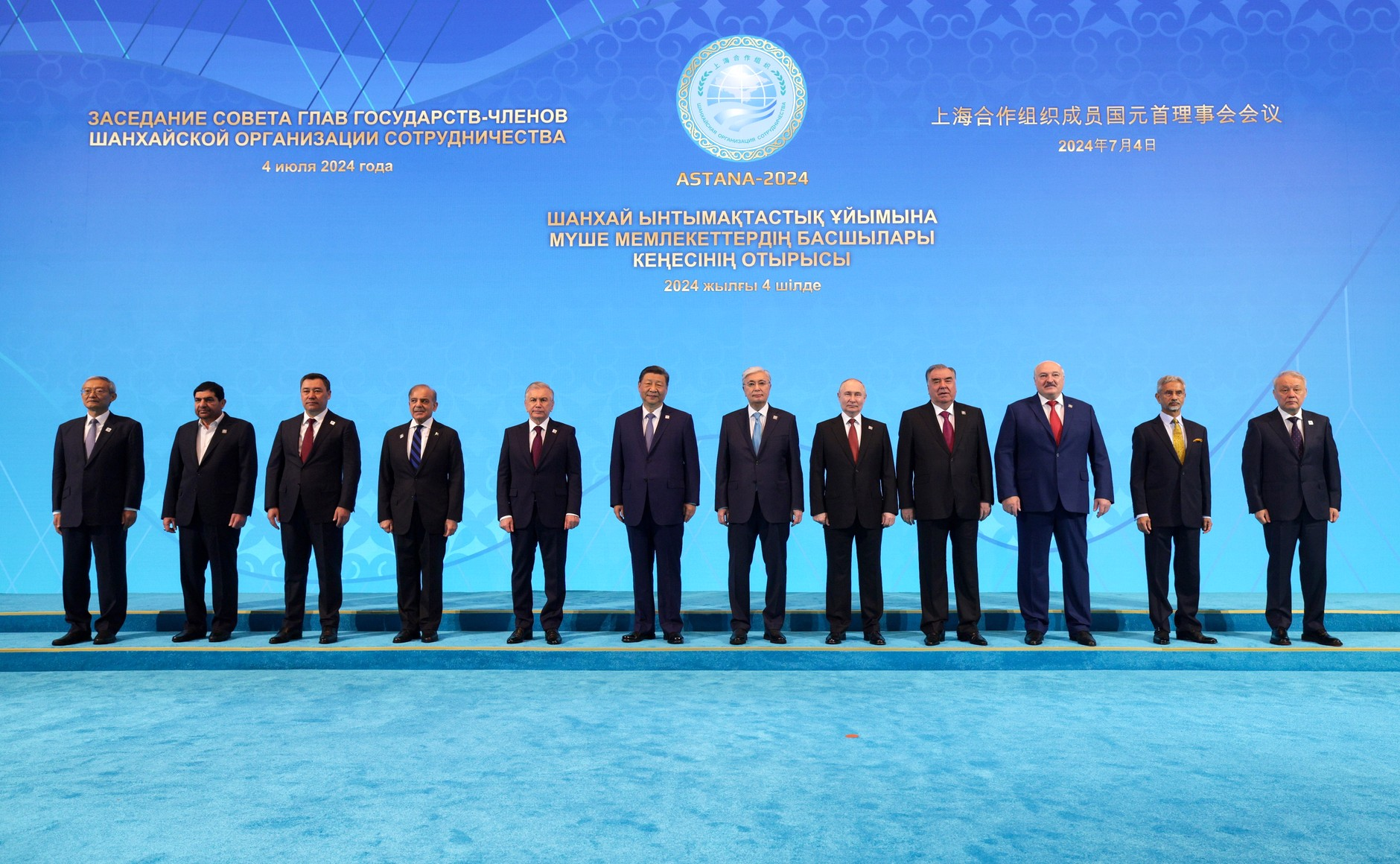
- Group photo of the summit
- Host country: Kazakhstan
- Date: 3-4 July 2024
- Cities: Astana
- Venues: Independence Palace
- Participants: Kazakhstan Russia; China; India; Pakistan; Uzbekistan; Kyrgyzstan; Tajikistan; Belarus; Iran; Turkey; Azerbaijan; Turkmenistan; Mongolia; Qatar United Arab Emirates
- Chair: Kassym-Jomart Tokayev
- Follows: 2023 New Delhi SCO summit
- Precedes: 2025 Tianjin SCO summit
- Website: sectsco.org

The 2024 SCO summit was the 24th annual summit of heads of state of the Shanghai Cooperation Organisation held between 3 and 4 July 2024 in Astana, Kazakhstan.

== Member states leaders and other dignitaries in attendance ==
=== Member states ===
- Belarus – President of Belarus Alexander Lukashenko
- China – President of China and CCP General Secretary Xi Jinping (Note: The president of China is legally a ceremonial representative with no real power, but the general secretary of the Chinese Communist Party (de facto leader in one-party communist state) has always held this office since 1993 except for the months of transition.)
- India – Minister of External Affairs S. Jaishankar
- Iran – Acting President of Islamic Republic of Iran Mohammad Mokhber
- Kazakhstan – President of Kazakhstan Kassym-Jomart Tokayev
- Kyrgyzstan – President of the Kyrgyz Republic Sadyr Japarov
- Pakistan – Prime Minister of Pakistan Shehbaz Sharif
- Russia – President of Russia Vladimir Putin
- Tajikistan – President of Tajikistan Emomali Rahmon
- Uzbekistan – President of Uzbekistan Shavkat Mirziyoyev

=== Observer states ===
- Mongolia – President of Mongolia Ukhnaagiin Khürelsükh

=== Invited guests ===
- Azerbaijan – President of Azerbaijan Ilham Aliyev
- Qatar – Emir of Qatar Tamim bin Hamad Al Thani
- Turkey – President of Türkiye Recep Tayyip Erdoğan
- Turkmenistan – Chairman of People's Council of Turkmenistan Gurbanguly Berdimuhamedow
- UAE – Ruler of Emirate of Ras Al Khaimah Saud bin Saqr Al Qasimi

=== International organizations ===
- United Nations – Secretary-General of the United Nations António Guterres

== See also ==
- 2024 SCO summit (Heads of government)
