= 2022 Samarkand SCO summit =

22nd annual summit of the SCO

2022 SCO summit
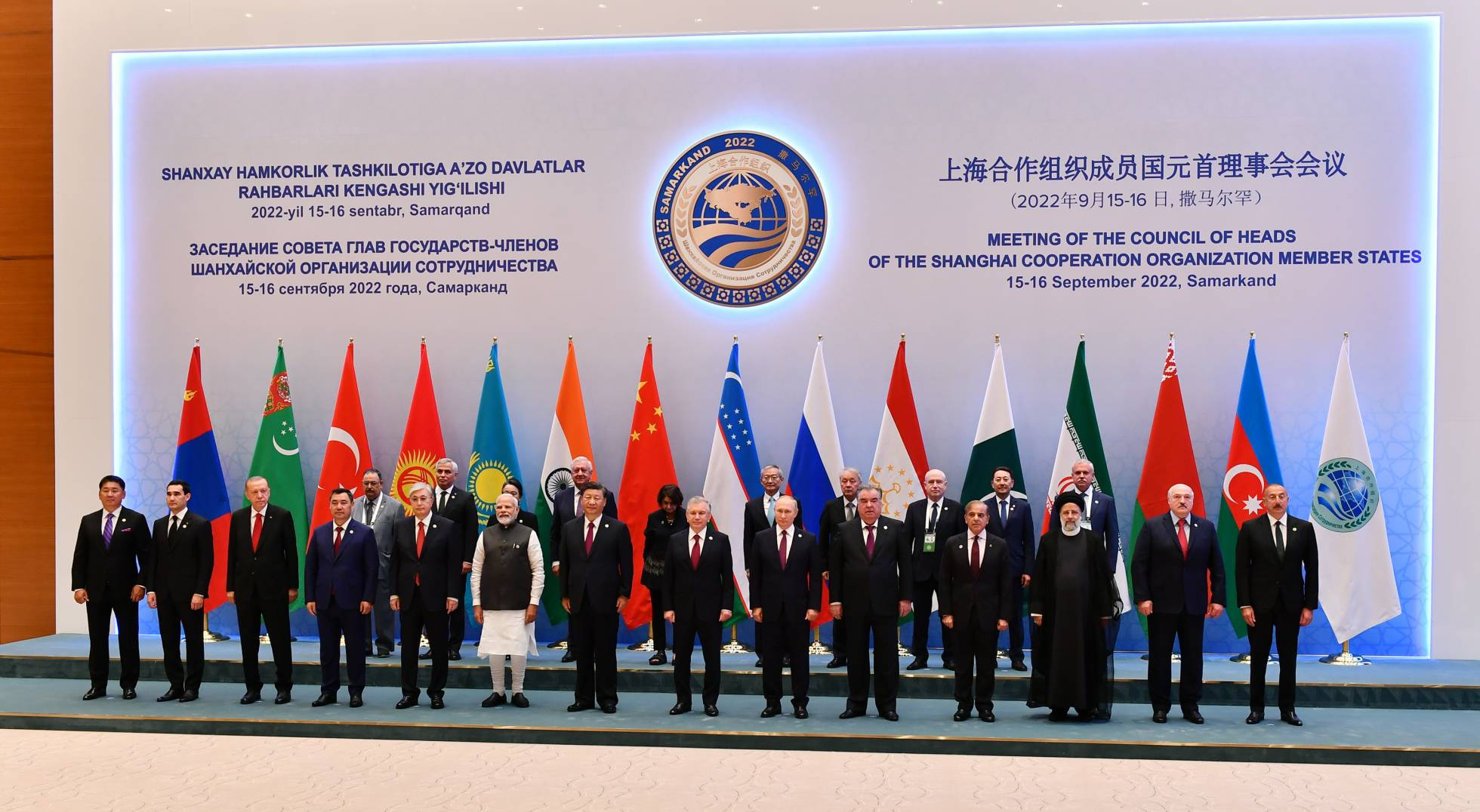
- Group photo of the summit
- Host country: Uzbekistan
- Date: 15-16 September 2022
- Cities: Samarkand
- Participants: Uzbekistan Russia; China; India; Pakistan; Kazakhstan; Kyrgyzstan; Tajikistan; Belarus; Iran; Turkey; Azerbaijan; Turkmenistan Mongolia
- Chair: Shavkat Mirziyoyev
- Follows: 2021 SCO summit
- Precedes: 2023 SCO summit
- Website: sectsco.org

The 2022 SCO summit was the 22nd annual summit of heads of state of the Shanghai Cooperation Organisation held between 15 and 16 September 2022 in Samarkand, Uzbekistan.

== Proceedings ==
As part of the meetings, general secretary of the Chinese Communist Party and Chinese president Xi Jinping met with Russian president Vladimir Putin. During the meeting, Putin acknowledged that the Chinese side had "concerns and questions" over Russia's invasion of Ukraine.

Putin also met with Indian prime minister Narendra Modi. During the meeting, Modi said that "today's era is not of war".

The leaders of Kyrgyzstan and Tajikistan met to discuss the 2022 Kyrgyzstan–Tajikistan clashes which escalated during the summit.

Iran formally submitted its application to join the SCO as a full member state, which is expected to become effective within a year.

Turkey also announced its intention to join in the future.

== Member states leaders and other dignitaries in attendance ==
=== Member states ===
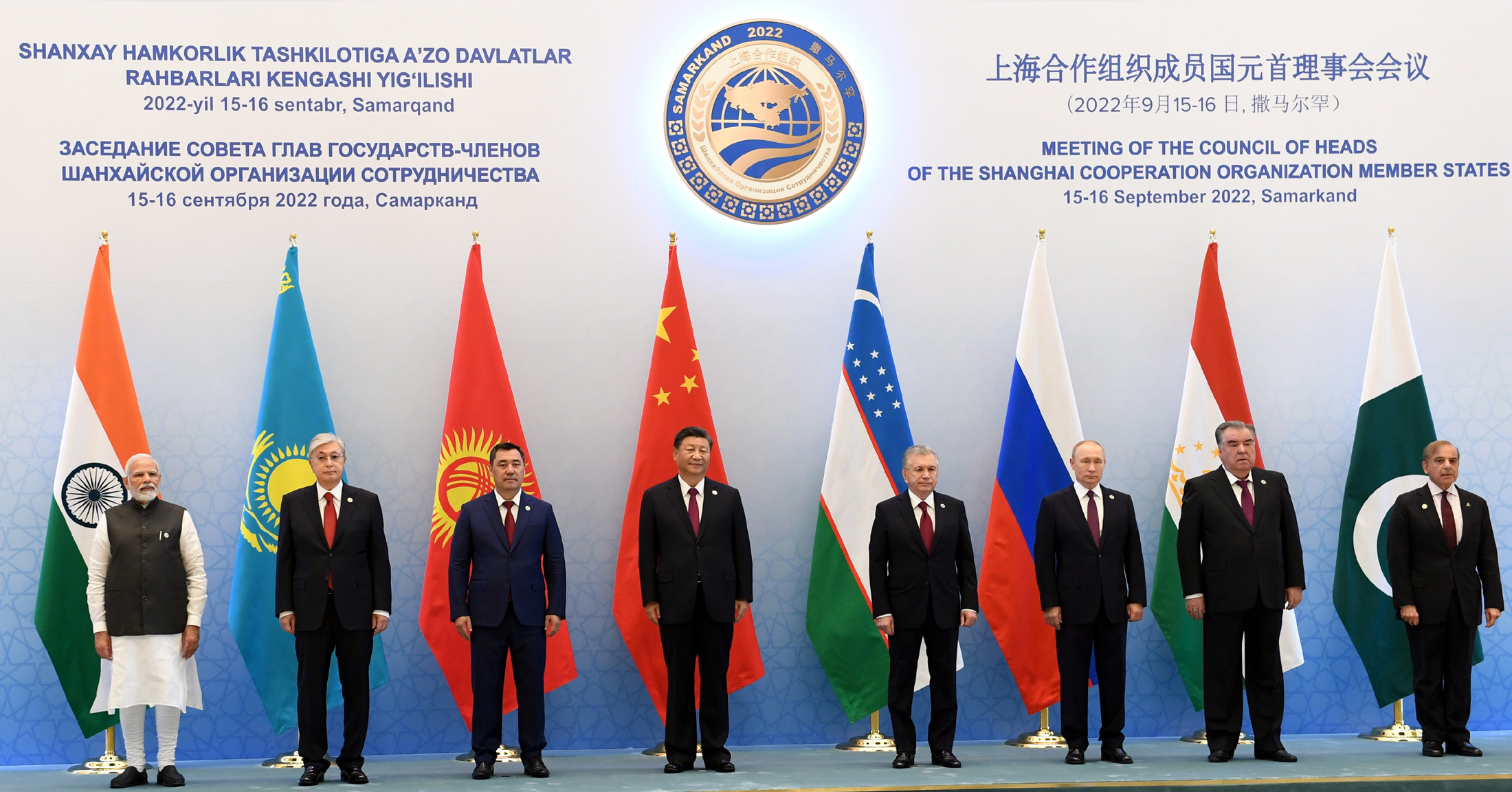
Heads of SCO member states.

- China – General Secretary of the Chinese Communist Party and President of China Xi Jinping
- India – Prime Minister of India Narendra Modi
- Kazakhstan – President of Kazakhstan Kassym-Jomart Tokayev
- Kyrgyzstan – President of the Kyrgyz Republic Sadyr Japarov
- Pakistan – Prime Minister of Pakistan Shehbaz Sharif
- Russia – President of Russia Vladimir Putin
- Tajikistan – President of Tajikistan Emomali Rahmon
- Uzbekistan – President of Uzbekistan Shavkat Mirziyoyev

=== Observer states ===
- Belarus – President of Belarus Alexander Lukashenko
- Iran – President of Iran Ebrahim Raisi
- Mongolia – President of Mongolia Ukhnaagiin Khürelsükh

=== Invited guests ===
- Azerbaijan – President of Azerbaijan Ilham Aliyev
- Turkey – President of Türkiye Recep Tayyip Erdogan
- Turkmenistan – President of Turkmenistan Serdar Berdimuhamedow

=== International organizations ===
- Collective Security Treaty Organization
- Commonwealth of Independent States
- Conference on Interaction and Confidence-Building Measures in Asia
- Economic Cooperation Organization
- Eurasian Economic Union
- United Nations
