= 2026 Bishkek SCO summit =

26th heads of state summit of the Shanghai Cooperation Organization

2026 Bishkek SCO summit 26th meeting of the SCO Council of Heads of State
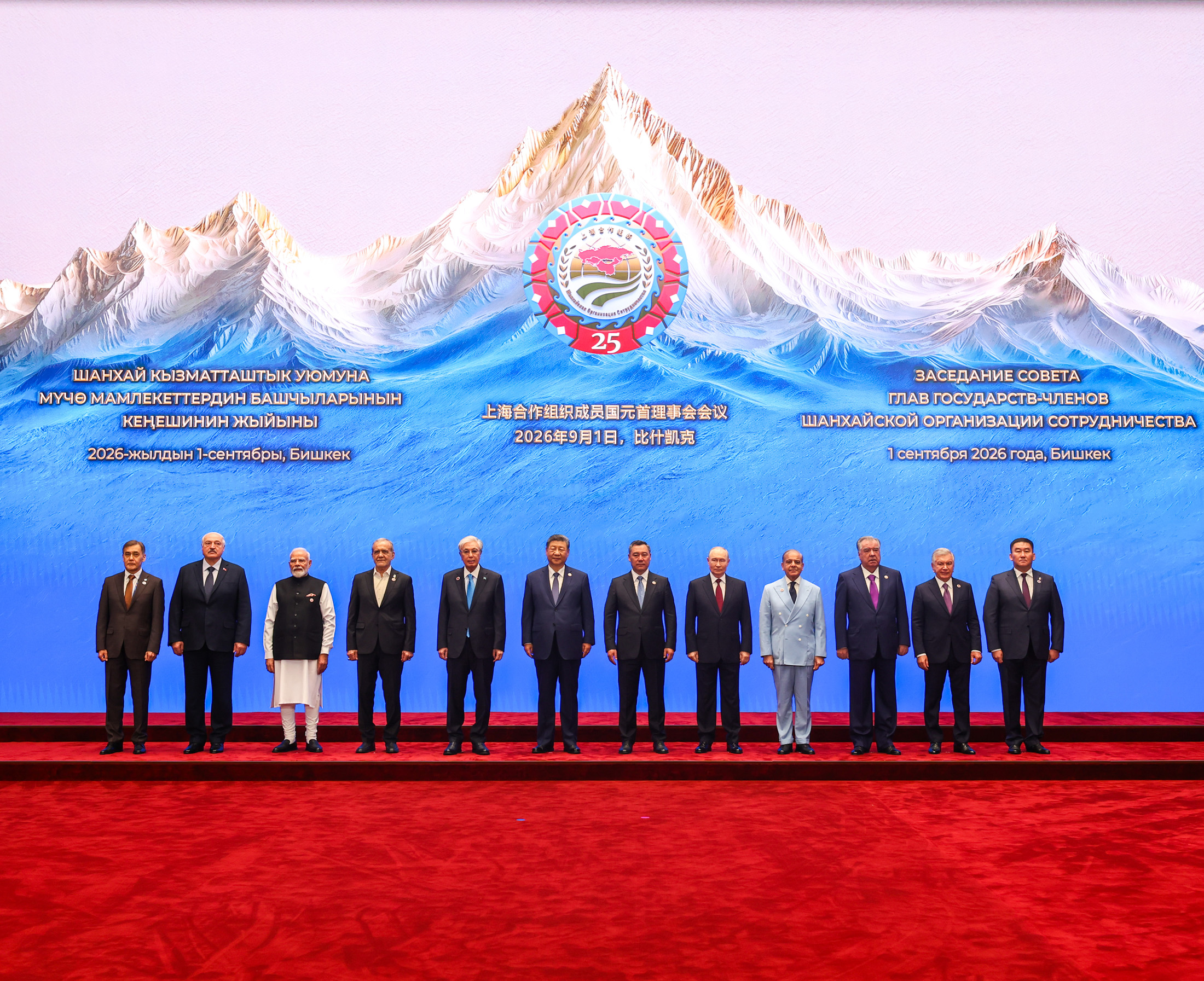
- Host country: Kyrgyzstan
- Date: 31 August – 1 September 2026
- Cities: Bishkek
- Participants: Kyrgyzstan Belarus; China; India; Iran; Kazakhstan; Pakistan; Russia; Tajikistan; Uzbekistan; Mongolia; Armenia; Azerbaijan; Egypt; Laos; Turkey; Togo Vietnam
- Chair: Sadyr Japarov
- Follows: 2025 Tianjin SCO summit
- Precedes: 2027 Islamabad SCO summit

The 2026 Bishkek SCO summit was the 26th meeting of the Council of Heads of State of the Shanghai Cooperation Organisation (SCO), held from 31 August to 1 September 2026 in Bishkek, Kyrgyzstan. It was the fourth time that Kyrgyzstan hosted the meeting, and it closed Kyrgyzstan's 2025–2026 rotating chairmanship, marking the 25th anniversary of the organisation's founding. The summit was chaired by Kyrgyz President Sadyr Japarov, under the theme "25 Years of the SCO: Together for Sustainable Peace, Development and Prosperity". The summit adopted the Bishkek Declaration and 27 other documents, and Kyrgyzstan handed the rotating chairmanship to Pakistan at the summit's conclusion.

== Background ==
The Shanghai Cooperation Organisation was founded in 2001 in Shanghai by China, Russia, Kazakhstan, Kyrgyzstan, Tajikistan and Uzbekistan. By 2026 it had ten member states — India and Pakistan joined in 2017, Iran in 2023, and Belarus in 2024 — with Afghanistan and Mongolia as observer states and fifteen dialogue partners. Kyrgyzstan assumed the rotating chairmanship after the 2025 Tianjin SCO summit, adopting the theme "25 Years of the SCO: Together for Sustainable Peace, Development and Prosperity". The Bishkek summit coincided with the 25th anniversary of the organisation and with the opening in Kyrgyzstan of the sixth World Nomad Games on 31 August.

== Preparations ==
Preparatory meetings during Kyrgyzstan's chairmanship included a gathering of the secretaries of the security councils of SCO member states in Bishkek in May 2026, an energy ministers' meeting in Bishkek in June at which ministers discussed energy security and consultations on a proposed SCO Energy Consortium, and a foreign ministers' meeting in Cholpon-Ata in July that approved draft documents for the summit, including the draft Bishkek Declaration. In late July, an SCO Media and Analytical Centers Summit (also reported as a Media and Think Tank Summit) was held at the Ala-Archa State Residence outside Bishkek, at which delegates adopted a "Bishkek Consensus" on cooperation among the bloc's media outlets and research institutions.

== Venue ==
The summit took place at the Rys Ordo Congress Hall (Kyrgyz: Рыс Ордо Конгресс-холлу; Russian: Конгресс-холл Рыс Ордо).

The name "Rys Ordo" derives from the Kyrgyz language: the term ordo historically denotes a nomadic ruler's headquarters, palace, or central encampment (such as the Rukh Ordo Cultural Center in Cholpon-Ata and the Manas Ordo complex in Talas).

Located on a 14.7-hectare state territory and situated directly adjacent to the Yntymak Ordo Presidential Palace, this complex was prominently completed to host this event. It features a 39,000-square-meter main facility, with five specialized meeting rooms, 235-seat press hall, a 1,000-person grand banquet hall and a 1,238-seat hall, the Kurultai conference hall. Adjacent to the compound are also eight luxury guest houses designed to fully accommodate visiting heads of state and official global delegations.

== Participants ==
The summit was chaired by Kyrgyz President Sadyr Japarov as host. The ten member states were represented by Belarusian President Alexander Lukashenko, CCP General Secretary Xi Jinping, Indian Prime Minister Narendra Modi, Iranian President Masoud Pezeshkian, Kazakh President Kassym-Jomart Tokayev, Pakistani Prime Minister Shehbaz Sharif, Russian President Vladimir Putin, Tajik President Emomali Rahmon and Uzbek President Shavkat Mirziyoyev, alongside Japarov. Beijing confirmed Xi's participation in late August. Modi travelled to Bishkek after a stop in Tashkent, and Sharif arrived on 31 August, remaining for a bilateral visit to Kyrgyzstan on 2 September.

In an expanded "SCO Plus" format, leaders from partner countries also attended, including Azerbaijani President Ilham Aliyev, Armenian Prime Minister Nikol Pashinyan, Mongolian President Ukhnaagiin Khürelsükh, Turkish President Recep Tayyip Erdoğan, General Secretary of the Lao People's Revolutionary Party Thongloun Sisoulith, Togolese President Faure Gnassingbé, Vietnamese Vice President Võ Thị Ánh Xuân and Egyptian Deputy Prime Minister Hussein Issa. The Kyrgyz presidential press service said leaders from 17 countries would attend. United Nations Secretary-General António Guterres and the heads of several international bodies — including SCO Secretary-General Nurlan Yermekbayev, CIS Secretary-General Sergey Lebedev, CSTO Secretary-General Taalatbek Masadykov, Eurasian Economic Commission Board Chairman Bakytzhan Sagintayev and CICA Secretary-General Kairat Sarybay — also attended.

== Agenda ==
According to the Kyrgyz presidential press service, the agenda covered current international and regional issues and priorities for the SCO's further development, together with cooperation in political, trade, economic, transport and logistics, digital, environmental, cultural and humanitarian spheres. Kyrgyz proposals for the summit included an SCO development bank, new transport corridors and an international centre for combating organised crime. The summit, the first since a reported thaw in China–India relations following their 2020 border clashes, drew attention to the interactions of Xi, Modi and Putin; Iranian media reported that Pezeshkian was scheduled to meet Putin on the sidelines.

== Sidelines and bilateral meetings ==
On the margins of the summit, Xi paid a state visit to Kyrgyzstan, during which he and Japarov signed a treaty on "eternal good-neighborliness, friendship and cooperation" and a joint declaration on their countries' comprehensive strategic partnership. Japarov separately met UN Secretary-General António Guterres, with discussion focused on Kyrgyzstan's forthcoming 2027–2028 term as a non-permanent United Nations Security Council member, and met US Special Envoy for South and Central Asia Sergio Gor. Modi and Xi were photographed greeting each other and speaking briefly after the summit's formal group photograph, which Indian media described as a further sign of the two countries' improving relations following the 2020 border clashes.

== Outcomes ==
On 1 September, SCO leaders signed the Bishkek Declaration on the 25th Anniversary of the Shanghai Cooperation Organization, along with 27 further documents covering security, counter-narcotics, artificial intelligence, biodiversity, energy and climate cooperation, nuclear security, and regional logistics, among other areas. The declaration condemned the "military strikes on the territory of the Islamic Republic of Iran" carried out by the United States and Israel as violations of international law, and expressed condolences over the death of Iranian Supreme Leader Ali Khamenei, who was assassinated in an airstrike in February 2026. It reaffirmed support for Iran's sovereignty and its right under the Nuclear Non-Proliferation Treaty to a peaceful nuclear programme, and called for a diplomatic resolution to the conflict. The declaration also addressed Israel's actions in Palestine, opposed unilateral sanctions inconsistent with UN and World Trade Organization rules, and committed member states to combating "terrorism, separatism, and extremism" without "double standards"—a passage that Indian and Pakistani leaders each characterised, in their own remarks at the summit, as directed at the other. The summit also declared Lahore, Pakistan, the SCO's Tourist and Cultural Capital for 2026–2027.

As expected, Kyrgyzstan handed the rotating SCO chairmanship to Pakistan at the summit's conclusion, which will host the 2027 summit in Islamabad.

== See also ==
- Shanghai Cooperation Organisation
- 2025 Tianjin SCO summit
