= SCO Interbank Consortium =

Shanghai Cooperation Organisation body

The Shanghai Cooperation Organisation Interbank Consortium (abbreviated as SCO IBC) is a platform for joint financing of development projects by members and other participants of the Shanghai Cooperation Organisation (SCO).

== History ==
The SCO Interbank Consortium was created in October 2005 during the 2005 SCO Summit. The consortium was among several economic integration projects announced during the summit. The first meeting of the SCO Interbank Association was held in Beijing on 21–22 February 2006.

At the 2025 SCO Tianjin summit, Xi Jinping announced that an additional ¥10 billion would be provided in loans to the SCO IBC between 2026 and 2029.

== Banks ==
=== Member banks ===
- Development Bank of Kazakhstan
- RSK Bank (Kyrgyzstan)
- China Development Bank
- VEB.RF (Russia)
- Amonatbonk State Savings Bank (Tajikistan)
- National Bank of the Republic of Uzbekistan for Foreign Economic Activity
- Habib Bank Limited (Pakistan)
- India Infrastructure Finance Company

=== Observers ===
- Eurasian Development Bank
- Belarusbank
- Development Bank of Mongolia

== Belt and Road Initiative ==
China has sought to use the platform to push for more cooperation under its Belt and Road Initiative. China Development Bank, one of the two main policy banks supporting the Belt and Road Initiative, had by the end of 2017 loaned $7.69 billion and 3.34 billion yuan to member banks of the SCO Interbank Consortium. The outstanding loans at the time stood at $2.05 billion and 3.3 billion yuan. At the 2018 SCO summit in Qingdao, China's paramount leader Xi Jinping pledged to set up a 30 billion yuan ($4.69 billion) for a special lending facility within the framework of the SCO Interbank Consortium. The capital would be put to use for cross-border transportation projects and industrial parks.

== SCO Development Bank ==
The SCO Development Bank is a proposed multilateral financial institution. Since 2010, China has sought to expand financial cooperation under the auspices of the Shanghai Cooperation Organisation by setting up the bank. Russia however has shown skepticism to the bank and in general has prioritized security cooperation within the SCO rather than economic projects. Russia has alternatively suggested to China to buy a stake in the Russian led Eurasian Development Bank. The Asian Infrastructure Investment Bank was established in 2015 and has substituted the proposed role of the SCO Development Bank to fund infrastructure projects in the region.

=== 2019 SCO Bishkek summit ===
Despite the delays, there still remains support among member states for creating the bank. Pakistani Prime Minister Khan at the 2019 SCO Summit called for the bank and an SCO development fund to be expeditiously created.

=== 2025 SCO Tianjin summit ===
During the 2025 SCO Tianjin summit, held between 1 August and 1 September, General Secretary of the Chinese Communist Party Xi Jinping announced China's plans to accelerate the development of the SCO Development Bank. The United States' sanction and tariff efforts are believed to have kindled China's acceleration of the bank. It was described to be a means of establishing a new global order aimed towards economic and security-related issues, particularly in developing nations, or the "Global South" according to Xi. Reuters argued this development to be a "direct challenge to the United States," reinforced through China's announcement of its Global Governance Initiative (GGI), aimed to circumvent US and Euro-centric global order.
