= Regional Anti-Terrorist Structure =

Military and law enforcement alliance

- Региональная Антитеррористическая Структура 地区反恐机构
- The SCO RATS shield

Organ overview
- Formed: 2004
- Jurisdiction: Member states of the Shanghai Cooperation Organisation
- Headquarters: Tashkent, Uzbekistan (until 2022); Moscow, Russia
- Organ executive: Ruslan Erkinovich Mirzaev, Executive Committee Director
- Parent organisation: Shanghai Cooperation Organisation
- Website: https://ecrats.org/

The Regional Anti-Terrorist Structure (Note: Russian: Региональная Антитеррористическая Структура; Chinese: 地区反恐机构; pinyin: Dìqū Fǎnkǒng Jīgòu) (RATS) is a permanent organ of the Shanghai Cooperation Organisation (SCO) tasked with coordinating counterintelligence, counterterrorism, and intelligence gathering efforts across member countries and advancing cooperation on SCO initiatives to mitigate the "Three Evils" – terrorism, separatism, and religious extremism. The organization is meant to lay the groundwork for a future enforcement capability within the SCO, which aspires to develop its own transnational police and military forces.

Member countries have more recently incorporated narcoterrorism and drug smuggling as focus areas for RATS, as narcotics have become a major source of funding for anti-government activities within member states. The organization also maintains a database of individuals and organizations aiding organizations designated as terrorists, separatists or extremists by member states.

RATS has been described by researchers at the United States Army War College as "SCO’s most important and best-functioning component structure to date."

The director of the RATS Executive Committee (执行委员会) is appointed by the SCO Council of Heads of State to a three-year term after which the role is traditionally transferred to the representative of another member state, rotating by order of accession. The current director is Ruslan Mirzayev of Uzbekistan, who assumed office on 1 January 2022.

RATS was headquartered in Tashkent, Uzbekistan, until 2022, when the organisation voted to move its headquarters to Moscow, Russia. RATS' official languages are Chinese, Russian and English.

== History ==
RATS was established in during a meeting of the Council of Heads of SCO Member States on June 7, 2002, in Saint Petersburg, though the organization did not become active until 2004. It is governed in accordance with the SCO Charter, the Shanghai Convention on Combating Terrorism, Separatism and Extremism, the Agreement among the SCO member states on the Regional Anti-Terrorist Structure, as well as the documents and decisions adopted in the framework of the SCO.

== Organization ==
=== International agreements ===
To varying extents, RATS has cooperation agreements with the United Nations, Interpol, the Commonwealth of the Independent States (CIS), the Collective Security Treaty Organization (CSTO), the Association of Southeast Asian Nations (ASEAN), and the Economic Cooperation Organization (ECO).

=== Member state representatives ===
RATS location within the structure of the SCO.

Member states have flexibility to appoint whomever they would like to represent their interests with RATS. There is no statutory requirement for the official to come from an intelligence or law enforcement background, though the Russian Federation for example has traditionally been represented by the principle deputy director of the FSB, and most Chinese representatives including previous RATS director Zhang Xinfeng have been members of the Ministry of Public Security.

== Criticism and controversy ==
Criticism of the SCO RATS within the organization has centered mainly around how the group describes its adversaries. Although China, India and Russia name the Pakistan-based Islamic extremist group Jaish-e-Mohammed a "terrorist group", Pakistan opposes the definition. What China claims are counterterrorism efforts in Xinjiang are criticized by other RATS members, and much of the international community, as persecution of Muslim ethnic minorities. Definitions of "terrorists" and "terrorist groups" have become more blurry and sensitive as the SCO has grown, and member states have tended to retain inconsistent definitions and standards concerning counterterrorism.

The list of entities designated as terrorist groups active in each member state has also been criticized for being discretionary, dictated by member governments. Russia since has used this authority to designate government opposition politician Alexei Navalny's Anti-Corruption Foundation (FBK) a terrorist entity with RATS.

== List of directors ==
Director		Term		
Portrait	Name	Took office	Left office	Term length
Vyacheslav Kasymov	(Uzbekistan) Vyacheslav Kasymov	15 June 2004	1 January 2007	2 years
Myrzakan Subanov	(Kyrgyzstan) Myrzakan Subanov	1 January 2007	1 January 2010	2 years
Dzhenisbek Dzhumanbekov [ru]	(Kazakhstan) Dzhenisbek Dzhumanbekov	1 January 2010	1 January 2012	2 years
Zhang Xinfeng	(China) Zhang Xinfeng	1 January 2013	1 January 2015	2 years
Yevgeniy Sysoev [ru]	(Russia) Yevgeniy Sysoev	1 January 2016	1 January 2018	2 years
Jumakhon Giyosov	(Tajikistan) Jumakhon Giyosov	1 January 2019	1 January 2021	2 years
Ruslan Erkinovich Mirzaev	(Uzbekistan) Ruslan Erkinovich Mirzaev	1 January 2021	2024	3 years
Ularbek Zarlykovich Sharsheev	(Kyrgyzstan) Ularbek Zarlykovich Sharsheev	1 January 2025	Incumbent	2 years
