= Shanghai Cooperation Organisation =

Eurasian multilateral security organisation

(in official languages)
| Russian | Шанхайская Организация Сотрудничества |
| Chinese | 上海合作组织 |

- Members Observers Dialogue Partners Disputed territories
- Abbreviation: SCO
- Predecessor: Shanghai Five
- Formation: 15 June 2001; 25 years ago
- Type: Mutual security, political, and economic cooperation
- Legal status: Regional cooperation forum
- Headquarters: Beijing, China (Secretariat); Tashkent, Uzbekistan (RATS Executive Committee)
- Members: Member states: Belarus; China; India; Iran; Kazakhstan; Kyrgyzstan; Pakistan; Russia; Tajikistan; Uzbekistan; Observer states: Afghanistan (Note: Inactive since September 2021 following the aftermath of the Taliban takeover of Afghanistan.); Mongolia; 15 dialogue partners: Armenia; Azerbaijan; Bahrain; Cambodia; Egypt; Kuwait; Laos; Maldives; Myanmar; Nepal; Qatar; Saudi Arabia; Sri Lanka; Turkey; United Arab Emirates; Guest attendees: ASEAN; CIS; Turkmenistan; UN
- Official language: Chinese; Russian
- Secretary-General: Nurlan Yermekbayev
- Deputy Secretaries-General: Ahmad Saidmurodzoda; Batir Tursunov; Oleg Kopylov; Piao Yangfan; Shri Janesh Kain; Sohail Khan
- RATS Executive Committee Director: Ularbek Sharsheev
- Website: sectsco.org

The Shanghai Cooperation Organisation (SCO) is a Eurasian political, economic and international security organisation of ten member states. It focuses on political, economic, security and counter-terrorism cooperation.

It is the world's largest regional organisation in terms of geographic scope and population, covering at least 24% of the world's total area (65% of Eurasia) and 42% of the world population. As of 2024, its combined nominal GDP accounts for around 23%, while its GDP based on PPP comprises approximately 36% of the world's total.

The SCO is the successor to the Shanghai Five, formed in 1996 between China, Kazakhstan, Kyrgyzstan, Russia, and Tajikistan. In June 2001, the leaders of these nations and Uzbekistan met in Shanghai to announce the SCO, a new organisation with deeper political and economic cooperation. In June 2017, it expanded to eight states, with India and Pakistan. Iran joined the group in July 2023, and Belarus in July 2024. Several countries are engaged as observers or dialogue partners. Its most recent meeting was held in September 2026 in Bishkek, Kyrgyzstan.

The SCO is governed by the Heads of State Council (HSC), its supreme decision-making body, which meets once a year. The organisation also contains the Regional Anti-Terrorist Structure (RATS).

== Origins ==
=== The Shanghai Five ===
The Shanghai Five group was created on 26 April 1996 when the heads of states of China, Kazakhstan, Kyrgyzstan, Russia and Tajikistan signed the Treaty on Deepening Military Trust in Border Regions in Shanghai.

On 24 April 1997 the same countries signed the Treaty on Reduction of Military Forces in Border Regions in a meeting in Moscow, Russia. On 20 May 1997, Russian President Boris Yeltsin and Chinese leader Jiang Zemin signed a declaration on a "multipolar world".

Subsequent annual summits of the Shanghai Five group occurred in Almaty, Kazakhstan in 1998, in Bishkek, Kyrgyzstan in 1999, and in Dushanbe, Tajikistan in 2000. At the Dushanbe summit, members agreed to "oppose intervention in other countries' internal affairs on the reason of 'humanitarianism' and 'protecting human rights;' and support the efforts of one another in safeguarding the five countries' national independence, sovereignty, territorial integrity, and social stability." The Shanghai Five structure helped speed up the members' resolution of border disputes, agree on military deployments in border areas, and address security threats.

=== Developing institutional forms ===
In 2001, the annual summit returned to Shanghai and the group was Institutionalised. The five member nations first admitted Uzbekistan in the Shanghai Five mechanism. On 15 June 2001, all six heads of state signed the Declaration of Shanghai Cooperation Organisation, praising the role played thus far by the Shanghai Five mechanism and aiming to transform it to a higher level of cooperation. From 2001 to 2008, the SCO developed rapidly, establishing a number of permanent bodies and ad hoc initiatives dealing with economic and security matters.

In June 2002, the heads of the SCO member states met in Saint Petersburg, Russia and signed the SCO Charter which expounded on the organisation's purposes, principles, structures and forms of operation. It entered into force on 19 September 2003. By 2003, a Council of Heads of State, a Council of Heads of Government and a Council of Foreign Ministers, as well as a permanent Secretariat based in Beijing was formed.

In July 2005, at the summit in Astana, Kazakhstan, with representatives of India, Iran, Mongolia and Pakistan attending an SCO summit for the first time, Nursultan Nazarbayev, the president of the Kazakhstan, greeted the guests in words that had never been used before in any context: "The leaders of the states sitting at this negotiation table are representatives of half of humanity". By 2007, the SCO had initiated over twenty large-scale projects related to transportation, energy and telecommunications and held regular meetings of security, military, defence, foreign affairs, economic, cultural, banking, and other officials from its member states.

In July 2015, in Ufa, Russia, the SCO decided to admit India and Pakistan as full members. In June 2016 in Tashkent, both signed the memorandum of obligations, thereby starting the process of joining the SCO. In June 2017, at a summit in Kazakhstan, India and Pakistan officially joined SCO as full members.

In 2004, the SCO established relations with the United Nations (where it is an observer in the General Assembly), the Commonwealth of Independent States in 2005, the Association of Southeast Asian Nations (ASEAN) in 2005, the Collective Security Treaty Organization in 2007, the Economic Cooperation Organization in 2007, the United Nations Office on Drugs and Crime in 2011, the Conference on Interaction and Confidence-Building Measures in Asia (CICA) in 2014, and the United Nations Economic and Social Commission for Asia and the Pacific (ESCAP) in 2015. in 2018, SCO Regional Anti-Terrorist Structure (RATS) has established relations with the African Union's African Centre for the Study and Research on Terrorism (ACSRT).

== Organisational structure ==

As of 2020, the Council of Heads of State was the top decision-making body in the SCO, meeting at the annual SCO summits in one of the member states' capital cities. Because of their government structure, the prime ministers of the parliamentary democracies of India and Pakistan attend the SCO Council of Heads of State summits, as their responsibilities are similar to the presidents of other SCO nations.

As of the 1 September 2025 meeting, the Council of Heads of State consists of:

- Aleksandr Lukashenko (Belarus)
- Xi Jinping (China)
- Narendra Modi (India)
- Masoud Pezeshkian (Iran)
- Kassym-Jomart Tokayev (Kazakhstan)
- Sadyr Japarov (Kyrgyzstan)
- Shehbaz Sharif (Pakistan)
- Vladimir Putin (Russia)
- Emomali Rahmon (Tajikistan)
- Shavkat Mirziyoyev (Uzbekistan)

The Council of Heads of Government is the second-highest council in the organisation. This council also holds annual summits, at which time members discuss issues of multilateral cooperation and approves the organisation's budget. As of the 1 November 2022 meeting, Council of Heads of Government consists of:

- Aleksandr Turchin (Belarus)
- Li Qiang (China)
- Narendra Modi (India) (usually sends a deputy, such as EAM Subrahmanyam Jaishankar at the 2021 summit)
- Alihan Smaiylov (Kazakhstan)
- Akylbek Japarov (Kyrgyzstan)
- Shehbaz Sharif (Pakistan) (usually sends a deputy, such as Parliamentary Secretary for Foreign Affairs Andleeb Abbas at the 2020 summit)
- Mikhail Mishustin (Russia)
- Qohir Rasulzoda (Tajikistan)
- Abdulla Aripov (Uzbekistan)

As of 2007, the Council of Foreign Ministers also held regular meetings, where they discussed the current international situation and interaction with other international organisations. As of 2021, the Council of National Coordinators coordinated the multilateral cooperation of member states within the framework of the SCO's charter.

Directors of SCO RATS Executive Committee
| Years in office | Name |
|---|---|
| 15 June 2004 – 2006 | (Uzbekistan) Vyacheslav Kasymov |
| 2007–2009 | (Kyrgyzstan) Myrzakan Subanov |
| 2010–2012 | (Kazakhstan) Dzhenisbek Dzhumanbekov |
| 2013–2015 | (China) Zhang Xinfeng |
| 2016–2018 | (Russia) Yevgeniy Sysoev |
| 2019–2021 | (Tajikistan) Jumakhon Giyosov |
| 2022–2024 | (Uzbekistan) Ruslan Mirzaev |
| 2025–present | (Kyrgyzstan) Ularbek Sharsheev |

Heads of SCO Secretariat
| Years in office | Name |
|---|---|
Executive Secretary
| 15 January 2004 – 2006 | (China) Zhang Deguang |
Secretaries-General
| 2007–2009 | (Kazakhstan) Bolat Nurgaliyev |
| 2010–2012 | (Kyrgyzstan) Muratbek Imanaliyev |
| 2013–2015 | (Russia) Dmitry Mezentsev |
| 2016–2018 | (Tajikistan) Rashid Alimov |
| 2019–2021 | (Uzbekistan) Vladimir Norov |
| 2022–2024 | (China) Zhang Ming |
| 2025–present | (Kazakhstan) Nurlan Yermekbayev |

The Secretariat of the SCO, headquartered in Beijing, China, is the primary executive body of the organisation. It serves to implement organisational decisions and decrees, drafts proposed documents (such as declarations and agendas), function as a document depository for the organisation, arranges specific activities within the SCO framework, and promotes and disseminates information about the SCO. The SCO secretary-general is elected to a three-year term. Nurlan Yermekbayev of Kazakhstan became the current secretary-general on 1 January 2025.

The Regional Anti-Terrorist Structure (RATS) Executive Committee, headquartered in Tashkent, Uzbekistan, is a permanent organ of the SCO which serves to promote cooperation of member states against the three evils of terrorism, separatism and extremism. The Director of SCO RATS Executive Committee is elected to a three-year term. Ularbek Sharsheev of Kyrgyzstan became the current Director on 1 January 2025. Each member state also sends a permanent representative to RATS.

The official languages of the SCO are Chinese and Russian.

The SCO has a youth group, which is entitled the Score Foundation.

== Membership ==
China
Kazakhstan
Kyrgyzstan
Russia
Tajikistan
Uzbekistan
India
Pakistan
Iran
Belarus
Mongolia
Sri Lanka
Turkey
Cambodia
Azerbaijan
Nepal
Armenia
Egypt
Qatar
Saudi Arabia
Kuwait
Maldives
Myanmar
UAE
Bahrain
Laos
Afghanistan (Islamic Republic)
│
1996
│
1998
│
2000
│
2002
│
2004
│
2006
│
2008
│
2010
│
2012
│
2014
│
2016
│
2018
│
2020
│
2022
│
2024
│
2026
Member Observer Dialogue partner

In 2025, the SCO decided to initiate a process to create a new status of SCO Partner, replacing the existing statuses of Observer and Dialogue Partner states.

=== Member states ===
A clickable Euler diagram showing the relationships between various Asian regional organizations

| Country | Accession started | Member since |
|---|---|---|
| China | — | 15 June 2001 (Note: China, Kazakhstan, Kyrgyzstan, Russia and Tajikistan were members of the Shanghai Five mechanism since 26 April 1996. Uzbekistan was included in the Shanghai Five mechanism on 14 June 2001. The six states then signed a declaration establishing the Shanghai Cooperation Organisation on 15 June 2001.) |
| Kazakhstan | — | 15 June 2001 |
| Kyrgyzstan | — | 15 June 2001 |
| Russia | — | 15 June 2001 |
| Tajikistan | — | 15 June 2001 |
| Uzbekistan | — | 15 June 2001 |
| India | 10 June 2015 | 9 June 2017 |
| Pakistan | 10 June 2015 | 9 June 2017 |
| Iran | 17 September 2021 | 4 July 2023 |
| Belarus | 16 September 2022 | 4 July 2024 |

=== Current and former observer states ===
| Country | Status granted |
|---|---|
| Mongolia | 2004 |
| Afghanistan (Note: Since the overthrow of the Islamic Republic of Afghanistan and the reinstatement of the Islamic Emirate of Afghanistan on 15 August 2021, Taliban representatives have not been participating in SCO meetings.) | 7 June 2012 (inactive since 2021) |
Former observers
| India | 5 July 2005 |
| Pakistan | 5 July 2005 |
| Iran | 5 July 2005 |
| Belarus | 2015 |

=== Current and former dialogue partners ===
The status of dialogue partner was created in 2008.

| Country | Status approved | Status granted (Note: A country officially becomes a SCO dialogue partner after its minister of foreign affairs and SCO Secretary-General sign a memorandum granting the status.) |
|---|---|---|
| Sri Lanka | 15 or 16 June 2009 | 6 May 2010 |
| Turkey | 7 June 2012 | 26 April 2013 |
| Cambodia | 10 July 2015 | 24 September 2015 |
| Azerbaijan | 10 July 2015 | 14 March 2016 |
| Nepal | 10 July 2015 | 22 March 2016 |
| Armenia | 10 July 2015 | 16 April 2016 |
| Egypt | 16 September 2021 | 14 September 2022 |
| Qatar | 16 September 2021 | 14 September 2022 |
| Saudi Arabia | 16 September 2021 | 14 September 2022 |
| Kuwait | 16 September 2022 | 5 May 2023 |
| Maldives | 16 September 2022 | 5 May 2023 |
| Myanmar | 16 September 2022 | 5 May 2023 |
| United Arab Emirates | 16 September 2022 | 5 May 2023 |
| Bahrain | 16 September 2022 | 15 July 2023 |
| Laos | 1 September 2025 | 10 July 2026 |
Former dialogue partners
| Belarus | 15 or 16 June 2009 | 28 April 2010 |

=== Guest attendees ===
Multiple international organisations and one country are guest attendances to SCO summits.

Organisation guest attendees
| Organisation | Organisation Type | First Meeting Attended |
|---|---|---|
| Association of Southeast Asian Nations | International union | 1 September 2025 |
| Commonwealth of Independent States | International union | |
| United Nations | International union | |
| Collective Security Treaty Organization | Military alliance | |
| Eurasian Economic Union | Economic union | |
| Economic Cooperation Organization | Economic union | |
| Conference on Interaction and Confidence-Building Measures in Asia | International union | |
| Asian Infrastructure Investment Bank | International bank | |

Country guest attendees
| Country | First Meeting Attended |
|---|---|
| Turkmenistan | |

Turkmenistan has previously declared itself a permanently neutral country, which was recognised by a resolution adopted by the United Nations General Assembly in 1995, thus ostensibly precluding its membership in the SCO. At the same time, Turkmenistan is a member of the Economic Cooperation Organization since 1992 and an observer of the Organization of Turkic States since 2021. Turkmenistan's head of state has been attending SCO summits since 2007 as a guest attendee.

=== Future membership possibilities ===
Suspected fears about new members weakening the organisation have stalled the addition of members over its existence. Instead, countries are added to various categories—observers, guests, and dialogue partners—to allow them to participate at summits.

==== List of potential observers, guests, or dialogue partners ====
| Country | Status applied for | Date |
|---|---|---|
| Bangladesh | Observer | 2012 |
| Syria | Dialogue partner (Note: Syria has initially applied for observer status, but "it was explained that first it is necessary to become a dialogue partner of the organization".) | 2015 |
| Israel | Dialogue partner | 2016 |
| Iraq | Dialogue partner | 2019 |
| Algeria | Observer | July 2023 |
| Libya | Dialogue partner | May 2026 |

==== Countries showing interest in joining the SCO ====
===== Turkey =====
In 2010, the SCO approved a procedure for admitting new members. In 2011, Turkey applied for dialogue partner status, which it obtained in 2013. At the same time, Turkey is a NATO member and the European Union candidate country. Turkish prime minister Recep Tayyip Erdoğan has stated that he has discussed the possibility of abandoning Turkey's candidacy of accession to the European Union in return for full membership in the Shanghai Cooperation Organisation. This was reinforced again on 21 November 2016, after the European Parliament voted unanimously to suspend accession negotiations with Turkey. Two days later, on 23 November 2016, Turkey was granted the chairmanship of SCO energy club for the 2017 period. That made Turkey the first country to chair a club in the organisation without full membership status. In 2022, at the 22nd summit of the SCO, the Turkish president said that Turkey would seek full SCO membership status. On 11 July 2024, Turkish president Recep Tayyip Erdoğan stated in a statement to the U.S. Newsweek magazine that they did not consider Turkey's membership in NATO as an alternative to the Shanghai Cooperation Organisation and BRICS.

===== Vietnam =====
In 2011, Vietnam expressed interest in obtaining observer status (but has not applied for it). Vietnamese PM Pham Minh Chinh attended the largest-ever Shanghai Cooperation Organization (SCO) summit in history in Tianjian from August 31 to September 1, 2025. On April 17, 2026, it was reported that during a state visit to China by Vietnamese President Tô Lâm, Vietnam "expressed its readiness to maintain exchanges on the possibility of becoming a partner of the SCO."

===== Ukraine =====
In 2012, Ukraine expressed interest in obtaining observer status. However, since the deposition of President Viktor Yanukovych and increased tensions with Russia, no application has been submitted and there are no current plans to incorporate Ukraine into the organisation.

===== Azerbaijan =====
Azerbaijan expects to receive observer status according to Azerbaijani Foreign Ministry spokesperson Aykhan Hajizada. Azerbaijan will probably become a full member of the SCO in a little while, President of the Republic of Kazakhstan Kassym-Jomart Tokayev said during his meeting with President of the Republic of Azerbaijan Ilham Aliyev on 3 July 2024 in Astana.

===== Myanmar =====
During 2025 Tianjin SCO summit, CCP general secretary Xi Jinping met Burmese military ruler Min Aung Hlaing to express his support to promote Myanmar to be a full member.

== Activities ==
=== Cooperation on security ===
As of 2023, the SCO is primarily centred on security-related concerns, describing the main threats it confronts as being terrorism, separatism and extremism. It has addressed regional human trafficking and weapons trafficking and created terrorist blacklists.

At SCO summit, held in Tashkent, Uzbekistan, on 16–17 June 2004, the Regional Anti-Terrorist Structure (RATS) was established. On 21 April 2006, the SCO announced plans to fight cross-border drug crimes under the counter-terrorism rubric.

In October 2007, the SCO signed an agreement with the Collective Security Treaty Organization (CSTO), in the Tajik capital of Dushanbe, to broaden cooperation on issues such as security, crime, and drug trafficking.

As of 2010, the organisation was opposing cyberwarfare, saying that the dissemination of information "harmful to the spiritual, moral and cultural spheres of other states" should be considered a "security threat". An accord adopted in 2009 defined "information war", in part, as an effort by a state to undermine another's "political, economic, and social systems". The Diplomat reported in 2017 that SCO has foiled 600 terror plots and extradited 500 terrorists through RATS. The 36th meeting of the Council of the RATS decided to hold a joint anti-terror exercise, Pabbi-Antiterror-2021, in Pakistan in 2021.

At the summit in Astana, Kazakhstan, in July 2024, the SCO called for the creation of a fair, multipolar world order based on the key role of the United Nations, international law and the aspiration of sovereign states towards a mutually beneficial partnership.

=== Military activities ===
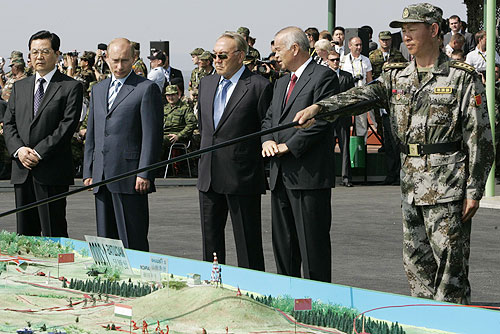
SCO leaders at Peace Mission 2007. Hu Jintao, Vladimir Putin, Nursultan Nazarbayev and Islam Karimov

As of 2009, the organisation's activities expanded to include increased military cooperation, intelligence sharing, and counterterrorism. At the same time, leaders of SCO states repeatedly stated that the SCO was not a military alliance.

As of 2023, the SCO had not provided military support in any actual conflicts. However, as of 2017, military exercises have regularly been conducted among members to promote cooperation and coordination against terrorism and other external threats, and to maintain regional peace and stability. There have been a number of SCO joint military exercises. The first of these was held in 2003, with the first phase taking place in Kazakhstan and the second in China. Since then China and Russia have teamed up for large-scale war games in Peace Mission 2005, Peace Mission 2007 and Peace Mission 2009, under the auspices of the Shanghai Cooperation Organisation. More than 4,000 soldiers participated at the joint military exercises in Peace Mission 2007, which took place in Chelyabinsk, Russia near the Ural Mountains, as was agreed upon in April 2006 at a meeting of SCO defence ministers. In 2010, Russian defence minister Sergei Ivanov said that the exercises would be transparent and open to media and the public. Following the war games' successful completion, Russian officials began speaking of India joining such exercises in the future and the SCO taking on a military role. Peace Mission 2010, conducted 9–25 September at Kazakhstan's Matybulak training area, saw over 5,000 personnel from China, Russia, Kazakhstan, Kyrgyzstan and Tajikistan conduct joint planning and operational maneuvers.

The SCO has served as a platform for larger military announcements by members. During the 2007 war games in Russia, with leaders of SCO member states in attendance including Chinese leader Hu Jintao, Russia's president Vladimir Putin used the occasion to take advantage of a captive audience. Russian strategic bombers, he said, would resume regular long-range patrols for the first time since the Cold War. "Starting today, such tours of duty will be conducted regularly and on the strategic scale", Putin said. "Our pilots have been grounded for too long. They are happy to start a new life".

In June 2014, in the Tajik capital Dushanbe, the idea was brought up to merge the SCO with the Collective Security Treaty Organization. However, as of late 2022, in the wake of Russian invasion of Ukraine in 2022, many SCO and even CSTO members had distanced themselves from military cooperation with Russia.

=== Economic cooperation ===
In September 2003, a Framework Agreement to enhance economic cooperation was signed by the SCO member states. At the same meeting the premier of China, Wen Jiabao, proposed a long-term objective to establish a free trade area in the SCO, while other more immediate measures would be taken to improve the flow of goods in the region. A follow-up plan with 100 specific actions was signed one year later, on 23 September 2004.

In October 2005, during the Moscow Summit of the SCO, the Secretary General of the Organisation said that the SCO would prioritise joint energy projects; including in the oil and gas sector, the exploration of new hydrocarbon reserves, and joint use of water resources. The creation of the SCO Interbank Consortium was also agreed upon in order to fund future joint projects. In February 2006, the first meeting of the SCO Interbank Association was held in Beijing. In November 2006, at The SCO: Results and Perspectives, an international conference held in Almaty, the representative of the Russian Foreign Ministry announced that Russia was developing plans for an SCO "Energy Club". in November 2007, Moscow reiterated the need for this "energy club" at an SCO summit. Other SCO members, however, did not commit themselves to the idea. During the 2008 summit it was stated that "Against the backdrop of a slowdown in the growth of world economy pursuing a responsible currency and financial policy, control over the capital flowing, ensuring food and energy security have been gaining special significance".

At the 2007 SCO summit, Iranian vice president Parviz Davoodi addressed an initiative that had been garnering greater interest when he said, "The Shanghai Cooperation Organisation is a good venue for designing a new banking system which is independent from international banking systems".

President Putin included these comments:

We now clearly see the defectiveness of the monopoly in world finance and the policy of economic selfishness. To solve the current problem Russia will take part in changing the global financial structure so that it will be able to guarantee stability and prosperity in the world and to ensure progress.
The world is seeing the emergence of a qualitatively different geo-political situation, with the emergence of new centers of economic growth and political influence.
We will witness and take part in the transformation of the global and regional security and development architectures adapted to new realities of the 21st century, when stability and prosperity are becoming inseparable notions.

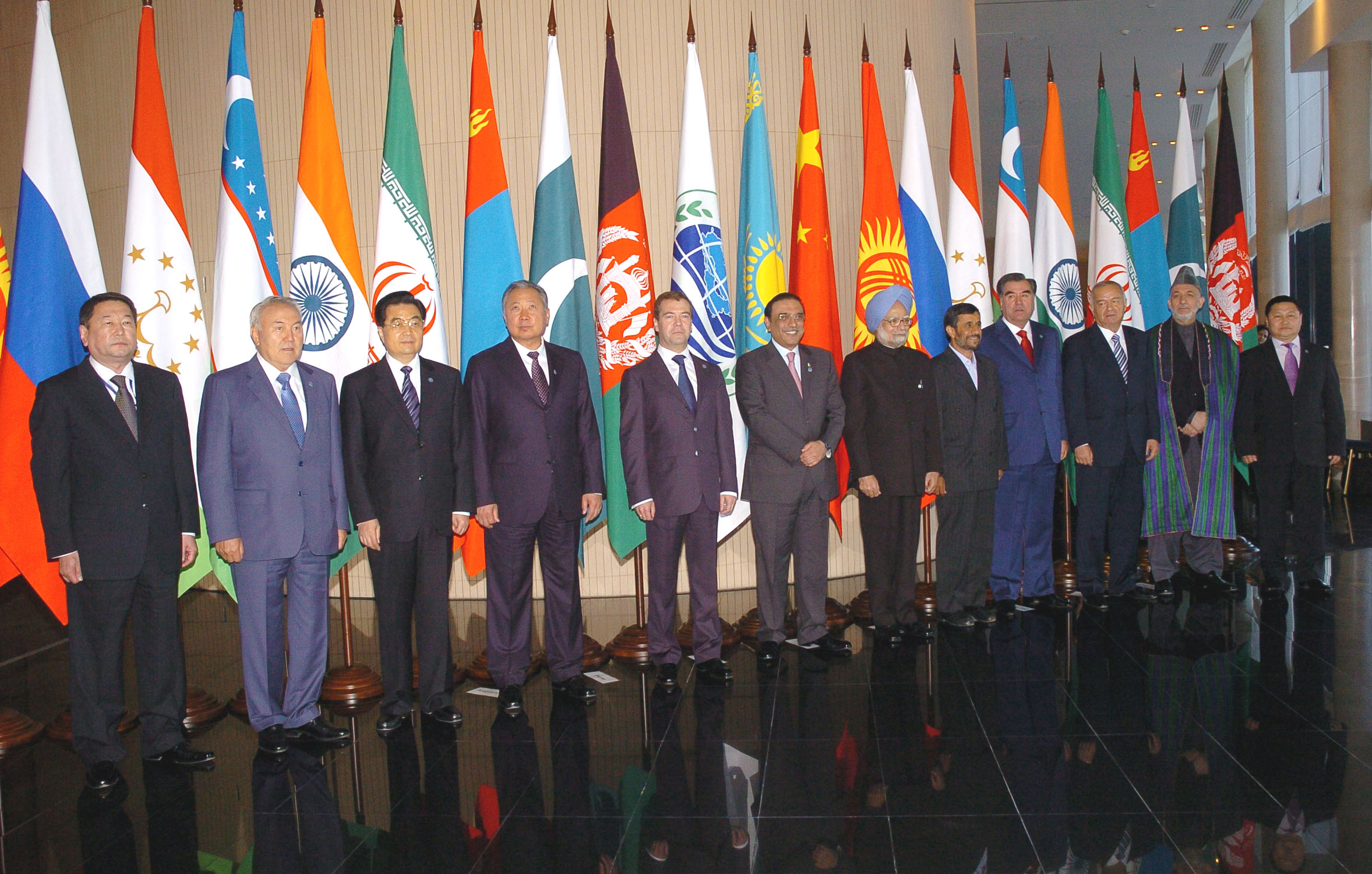
Leaders present at the SCO summit in Yekaterinburg, Russia in 2009

In June 2009, at the Yekaterinburg Summit, China announced plans to provide a US$10 billion loan to other SCO member states to shore up the struggling economies of its members affected by the 2008 financial crisis. The summit was held together with the first BRIC summit, and the China–Russia joint statement said that they want a bigger quota in the International Monetary Fund.

In 2014, the Eurasian Economic Union was founded in which Russia, Kazakhstan and Kyrgyzstan are members.

During the 2019 Bishkek summit, Pakistani Prime Minister Imran Khan suggested taking steps to trade in local currencies instead of U.S. dollars and setting up financial institutions including an SCO bank.

In June 2022, Iran's Deputy Foreign Minister for Economic Diplomacy Mehdi Safari suggested creating a single SCO currency to facilitate trade and financial transactions among SCO members.

As part of the SCO's economic agenda, it has established a relatively successful student exchange programme called the SCO University.

=== Cultural cooperation ===
Culture ministers of the SCO met for the first time in Beijing on 12 April 2002, signing a joint statement for continued cooperation. The third meeting of the Culture Ministers took place in Tashkent, Uzbekistan, on 27–28 April 2006.

An SCO Arts Festival and Exhibition was held for the first time during the Astana Summit in 2005. Kazakhstan suggested an SCO folk dance festival to take place in 2008, in Astana.

=== SCO+ ===
The SCO+ forum format was initiated by the United Russia party in October 2020. This format includes inter-party interaction not only of the countries of the Shanghai Cooperation Organization (members, observers, candidates) but also of the CIS and BRICS countries.

It was first used during the SCO+ international inter-party forum "Economy for People" on 22–23 October 2020. The forum was attended by speakers from 25 countries, including the chairman of the United Russia party, Dmitry Medvedev, ministers of the SCO countries, Serbian president Aleksandar Vučić, and ambassadors and diplomats of the CIS and BRICS countries. Russian president Vladimir Putin sent greetings to the forum participants.

== RATS Military exercises ==
In December 2025 for the first time ever Iran held its first military excerises with 6 other member states nations on Iranian soil post-war of Israel-Iran dubbed Sahand 2025 drills.

== Summits ==
According to the Charter of the SCO, summits of the Council of Heads of State shall be held annually at alternating venues. The locations of these summits follow the alphabetical order of the member state's name in Russian. The charter also dictates that the Council of Heads of Government (that is, the Prime Ministers) shall meet annually in a place decided upon by the council members. The Council of Foreign Ministers is supposed to hold a summit one month before the annual summit of Heads of State. Extraordinary meetings of the Council of Foreign Ministers can be called by any two member states.

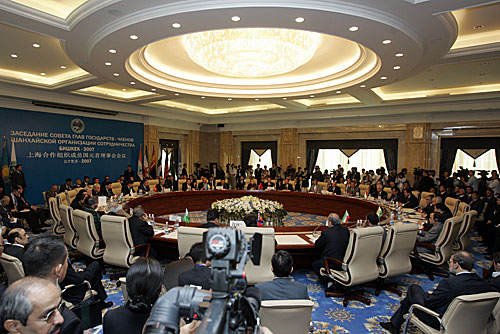
Summit of Bishkek (Kyrgyzstan) in 2007

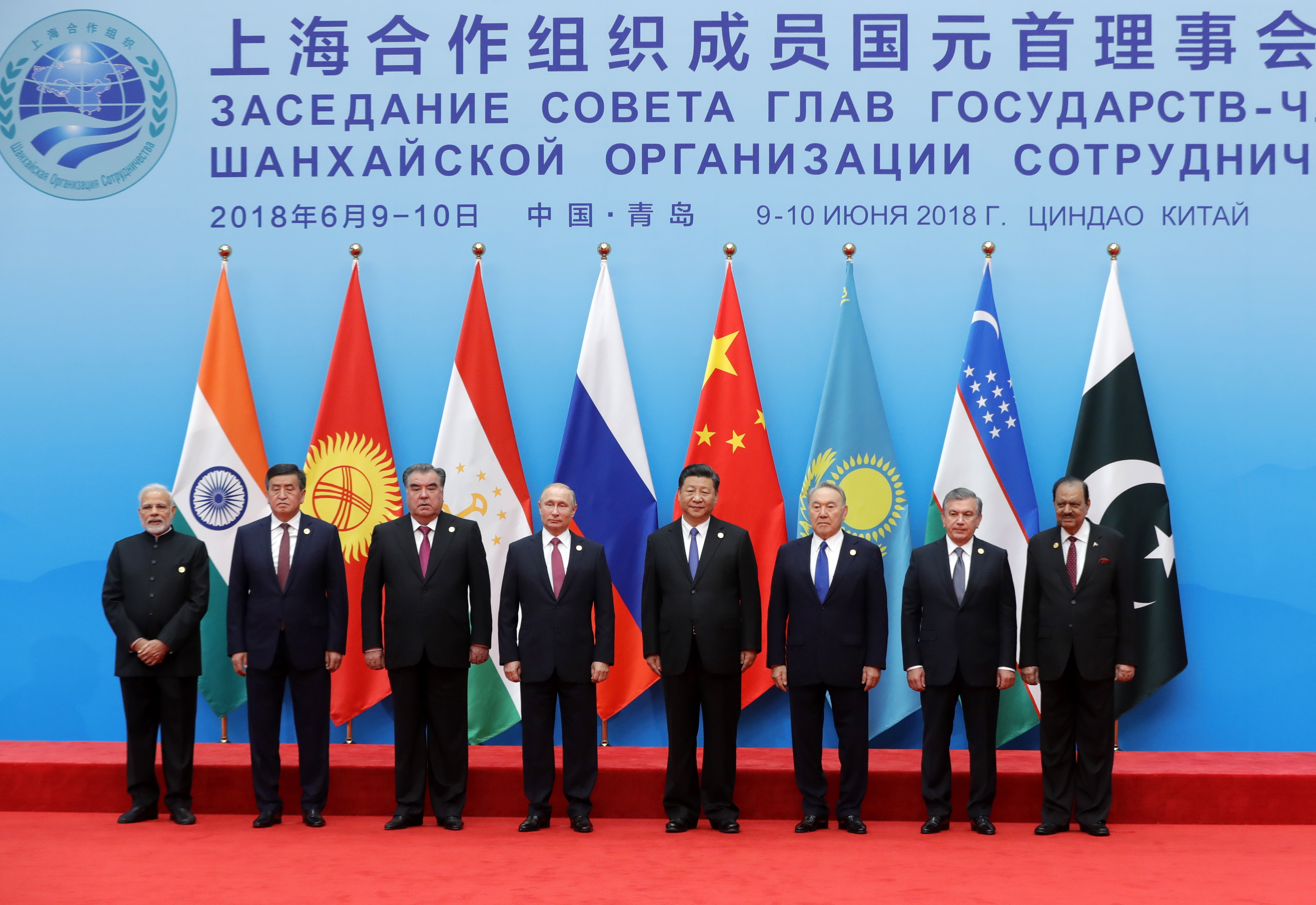
Heads of state of member states at the 2018 summit in Qingdao, Shandong, China

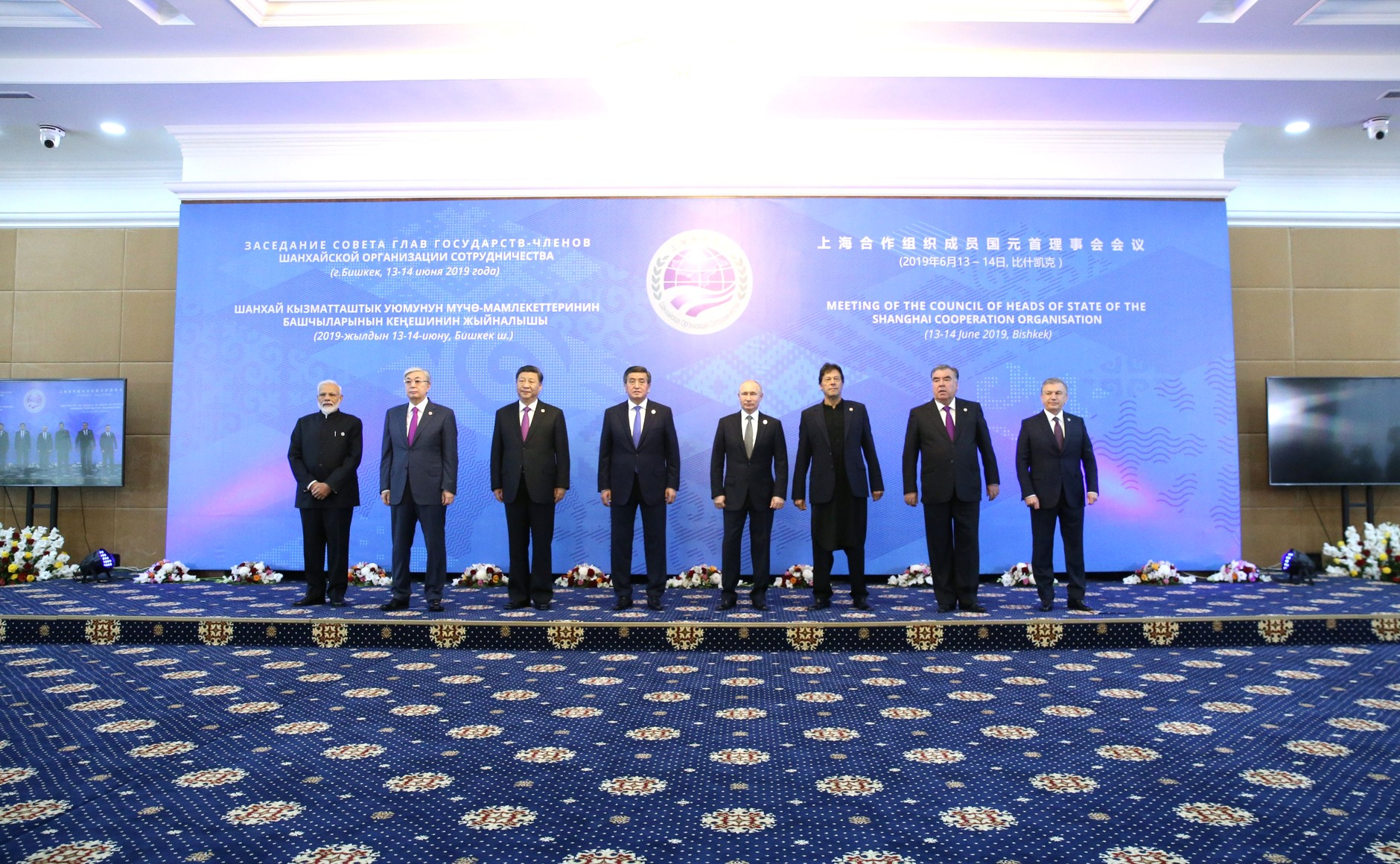
Heads of states and governments of the member states at the 2019 summit

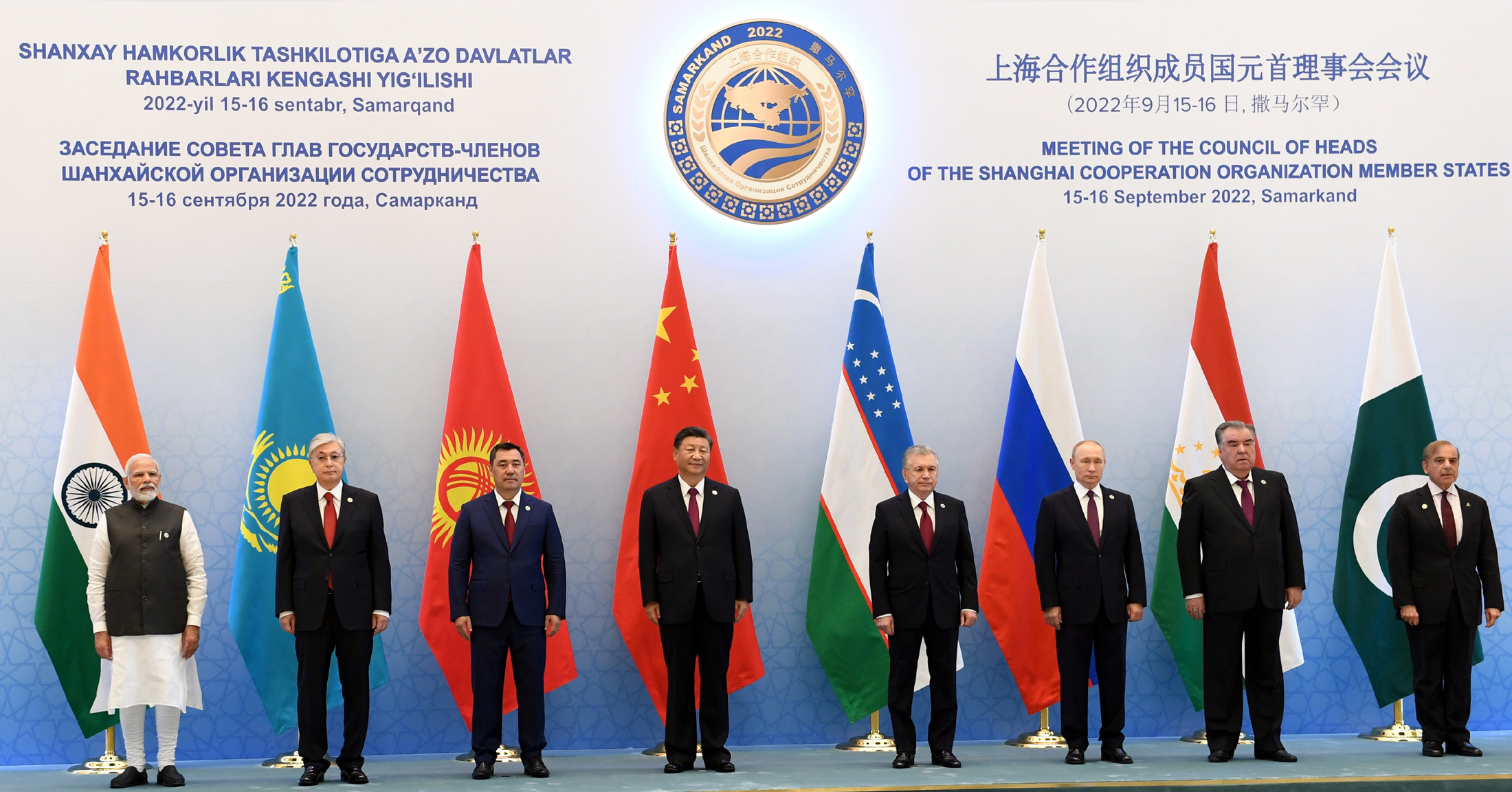
Heads of states and governments of the member states at the 2022 summit in Samarkand, Uzbekistan

=== List of summits ===
Summits of heads of state
| Date | Country | Location |
|---|---|---|
| 14–15 June 2001 | China | Shanghai |
| 7 June 2002 | Russia | Saint Petersburg |
| 29 May 2003 | Russia | Moscow |
| 17 June 2004 | Uzbekistan | Tashkent |
| 5 July 2005 | Kazakhstan | Astana |
| 15 June 2006 | China | Shanghai |
| 16 August 2007 | Kyrgyzstan | Bishkek |
| 28 August 2008 | Tajikistan | Dushanbe |
| 15–16 June 2009 | Russia | Yekaterinburg |
| 10–11 June 2010 | Uzbekistan | Tashkent |
| 14–15 June 2011 | Kazakhstan | Astana |
| 6–7 June 2012 | China | Beijing |
| 13 September 2013 | Kyrgyzstan | Bishkek |
| 11–12 September 2014 | Tajikistan | Dushanbe |
| 9–10 July 2015 | Russia | Ufa |
| 23–24 June 2016 | Uzbekistan | Tashkent |
| 8–9 June 2017 | Kazakhstan | Astana |
| 9–10 June 2018 | China | Qingdao |
| 14–15 June 2019 | Kyrgyzstan | Bishkek |
| 10 November 2020 | Russia | Video conference |
| 16–17 September 2021 | Tajikistan | Dushanbe |
| 15–16 September 2022 | Uzbekistan | Samarkand |
| 4 July 2023 | India | Video conference |
| 3–4 July 2024 | Kazakhstan | Astana |
| 31 August – 1 September 2025 | China | Tianjin |
| 31 August – 1 September 2026 | Kyrgyzstan | Bishkek |
| 2027 | Pakistan | Islamabad |

Summits of heads of government
| Date | Country | Location |
|---|---|---|
| 14 September 2001 | Kazakhstan | Almaty |
| — | — | — |
| 23 September 2003 | China | Beijing |
| 23 September 2004 | Kyrgyzstan | Bishkek |
| 26 October 2005 | Russia | Moscow |
| 15 September 2006 | Tajikistan | Dushanbe |
| 2 November 2007 | Uzbekistan | Tashkent |
| 30 October 2008 | Kazakhstan | Astana |
| 14 October 2009 | China | Beijing |
| 25 November 2010 | Tajikistan | Dushanbe |
| 7 November 2011 | Russia | Saint Petersburg |
| 5 December 2012 | Kyrgyzstan | Bishkek |
| 29 November 2013 | Uzbekistan | Tashkent |
| 14–15 December 2014 | Kazakhstan | Astana |
| 14–15 December 2015 | China | Zhengzhou |
| 2–3 November 2016 | Kyrgyzstan | Bishkek |
| 30 November 2017 | Russia | Sochi |
| 11–12 October 2018 | Tajikistan | Dushanbe |
| 1–2 November 2019 | Uzbekistan | Tashkent |
| 30 November 2020 | India | Video conference |
| 25 November 2021 | Kazakhstan | Video conference |
| 1 November 2022 | China | Video conference |
| 26 Oсtober 2023 | Kyrgyzstan | Bishkek |
| 15–16 October 2024 | Pakistan | Islamabad |
| 18 November 2025 | Russia | Moscow |
| 20 Oсtober 2026 | Tajikistan | Dushanbe |

== Analysis ==
=== Relations with the West ===
The United States applied for observer status in the SCO, but was rejected in 2005.

At the Astana summit in July 2005, with the wars in Afghanistan and Iraq foreshadowing an indefinite presence of U.S. forces in Uzbekistan and Kyrgyzstan, the SCO requested the U.S. to set a clear timetable for withdrawing its troops from SCO member states. Shortly afterwards, Uzbekistan requested the U.S. leave the K2 air base.

A report in 2007 noted that the SCO has made no direct comments against the U.S. or its military presence in the region; however, some indirect statements at the past summits have been viewed by Western media outlets as "thinly veiled swipes at Washington".

From 2001 to 2008, the Western reaction to the SCO was generally skepticism of the organisation's goals. By the 2010s, however, the West increasingly began to view the SCO as a potential contributor to stability in the region, particularly with regards to Afghanistan.

In September 2023, the United Nations approved United Nations resolution A/77/L.107, titled "Cooperation between the United Nations and the Shanghai Cooperation Organization." The result of the vote was 80 in favour to 2 against with 47 abstentions. The United States and Israel were the only countries to vote against the resolution.

Although the European Council on Foreign Relations dubbed the SCO an "anti NATO alliance" in 2022, apparent inconsistencies among its member states have prevented it from becoming an effective geopolitical alliance. As of July 2023, India and Central Asian countries maintained friendly cooperation with both the West and Russia, India has had fierce conflicts with Pakistan and its ally China at the same time, which has been limiting the possibility of China and Russia forming the group into an anti-Western bloc. Academics Simon Curtis and Ian Klaus write that although SCO has sometimes been compared to NATO, unlike NATO, SCO does not create a collective security alliance.

=== Geopolitical aspects ===
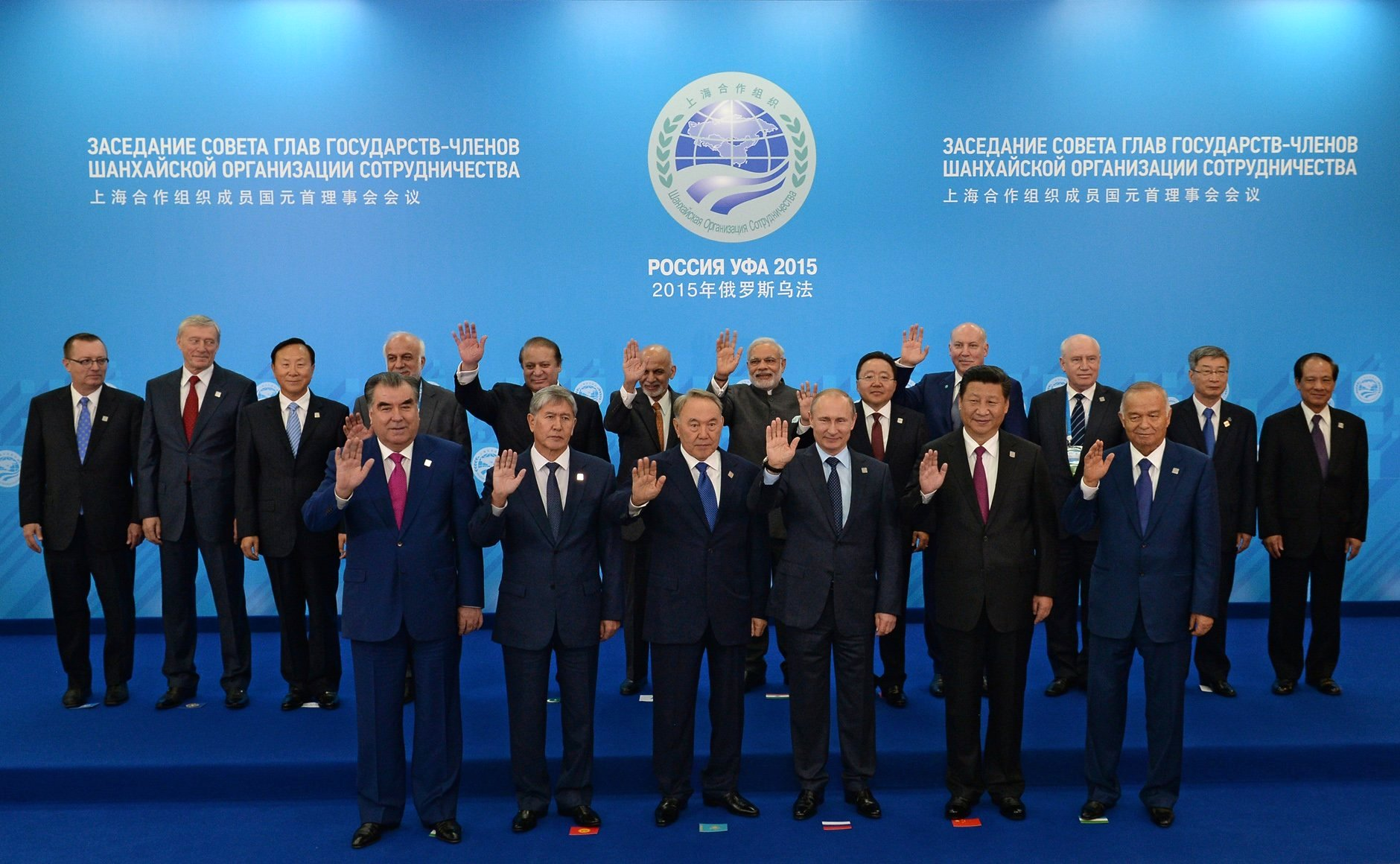
SCO summit in Ufa, Russia in 2015

SCO and NATO Member States

At a 2005 summit in Kazakhstan the SCO issued a Declaration of Heads of Member States of the SCO which said: "The heads of the member states point out that, against the backdrop of a contradictory process of globalisation, multilateral cooperation, which is based on the principles of equal right and mutual respect, non-intervention in internal affairs of sovereign states, non-confrontational way of thinking and consecutive movement towards democratisation of international relations, contributes to overall peace and security, and call upon the international community, irrespective of its differences in ideology and social structure, to form a new concept of security based on mutual trust, mutual benefit, equality and interaction."

In November 2005 Russian Foreign Minister Sergey Lavrov reiterated that the "Shanghai Cooperation Organisation (SCO) is working to establish a rational and just world order" and that "The Shanghai Cooperation Organisation provides us with a unique opportunity to take part in the process of forming a fundamentally new model of geopolitical integration".

In 2007, Matthew Brummer tracked the implications of SCO expansion into the Persian Gulf. In 2008, one aim of SCO was to ensure that liberal democracy could not gain ground in these countries, according to political scientist Thomas Ambrosio. In 2016, political scientist Thomas Fingar wrote that China took the lead in establishing the Shanghai Five primarily to limit Russia's ability to reassert its influence in Central Asia.

During the 2008 Russo-Georgian war, China opposed Russia's infringement on Georgia's sovereignty. Citing principles of sovereignty, territorial integrity, and global order, China used its influence in the SCO to prevent the organisation from supporting Russia.

In 2008, Iranian writer Hamid Golpira had this to say on the topic: "According to Zbigniew Brzezinski's theory, control of the Eurasian landmass is the key to global domination and control of Central Asia is the key to control of the Eurasian landmass....Russia and China have been paying attention to Brzezinski's theory, since they formed the Shanghai Cooperation Organisation in 2001, ostensibly to curb extremism in the region and enhance border security, but most probably with the real objective of counterbalancing the activities of the United States and the rest of the NATO alliance in Central Asia".

In 2008, the People's Daily wrote: "The Declaration points out that the SCO member countries have the ability and responsibility to safeguard the security of the Central Asian region, and calls on Western countries to leave Central Asia. That is the most noticeable signal given by the Summit to the world".

In January 2023, India as SCO chair, invited Pakistan's Foreign Affairs Minister and Chief justice to attend a meeting in Goa in May 2023. As of May 2023, India and Pakistan continued to spar over terrorism, while Central Asian members Kyrgyzstan and Tajikistan have erupted in armed conflict over border disputes. The SCO was not a platform for resolving bilateral issues, and its members were also reluctant to mediate disputes multilaterally. Due to the widely divergent agendas among member states, Indian commentators even called it the "Shanghai Contradiction Organisation".

Members of the SCO remained neutral in the Russo-Ukrainian war, they also strengthened cooperation with the Russian Federation. Analysis in 2024 points out that the SCO has generally facilitated amicable China-Russia relations.

In June 2025, India refused to endorse a joint statement at the Shanghai Cooperation Organisation (SCO) defence ministers’ meeting in Qingdao, China, citing concerns that it did not reflect its position on terrorism. India objected to the omission of the 22 April 2025 Pahalgam attack, in which 26 Indian tourists were killed, while the statement referenced militant activity in Balochistan. Defence Minister Rajnath Singh argued that the statement aligned with Pakistan's narrative and urged the SCO to hold accountable those who use "cross-border terrorism as an instrument of policy." India maintained that such omissions made the statement unacceptable. India's foreign ministry spokesman Randhir Jaiswal expressed that India wanted "concerns on terrorism to be reflected in the SCO document, which was not acceptable to one particular country, and therefore the statement was not adopted." Subsequently, at the SCO Council of Foreign Ministers’ Meeting on 15 July 2025, India's External Affairs Minister S. Jaishankar described the Pahalgam attack as a deliberate attempt to undermine Jammu and Kashmir's tourism and incite religious division. He emphasised the need for the SCO to uphold its founding principles by maintaining an uncompromising stance against terrorism, separatism, and extremism.

In July 2025, Minister Jaishankar also raised concerns over China's construction of the Medog Hydropower Station on the Yarlung Tsangpo River. He emphasised the potential downstream impacts on water security and ecological stability, and called for greater transparency, meaningful consultation with affected countries, and the resumption of suspended hydrological data sharing.

=== Other analysis ===
A 2015 European Parliamentary Research Service paper concludes, "The SCO's main achievement thus far is to have offered its members a cooperative forum to balance their conflicting interests and to ease bilateral tensions. It has built up joint capabilities and has agreed on common approaches in the fight against terrorism, separatism and extremism. However, major shortcomings, such as institutional weaknesses, a lack of common financial funds for the implementation of joint projects and conflicting national interests have prevented the SCO from achieving a higher level of regional cooperation in other areas."

== See also ==
- Asia Cooperation Dialogue – Intergovernmental organization
- Asia–Europe Meeting – Asian–European political dialogue forum
- Association of Southeast Asian Nations – Intergovernmental forum of Southeast Asian nations
- Bay of Bengal Initiative for Multi-Sectoral Technical and Economic Cooperation – International cooperation organisation
- Belt and Road Initiative – Chinese global infrastructure project
- Collective Security Treaty Organization – Intergovernmental military alliance
- Conference on Interaction and Confidence-Building Measures in Asia – Inter-governmental forum
- Continental union – Regional organization which facilitates pan-continental integration
- Eurasian Economic Union – Trade bloc of five post-Soviet states
- Eurasianism – Socio-political movement in the Russian Federation
- Global East – Eastern region of world
- South Asian Association for Regional Cooperation – Intergovernmental organization
