= State Border Guard Service of Kyrgyzstan =

Border security branch of Kyrgyzstan's military

State Border Guard Service Мамлекеттик Чегaра Кызматы
- Emblem of the State Border Guard Service

- The Russian language banner of the State Border Guard Service

Agency overview
- Formed: 31 August 2002
- Preceding agency: Soviet Border Troops
- Employees: 6,800

Jurisdictional structure
- Operations jurisdiction: Kyrgyzstan
- Specialist jurisdiction: National border patrol, security, integrity

Operational structure
- Headquarters: 720005, Kyrgyz Republic, G. Bishkek, O. Mederov Street, 163
- Agency executive: Major-General Abdikarim Alimbaev
- Parent agency: State Committee for National Security

Website
- www.gps.gov.kg

The Border Guard Service of the State Committee for National Security of the Kyrgyz Republic, or simply the Kyrgyz Frontier Force, is the border guard of the Kyrgyz Republic. It is currently a Public Service department of the government of the republic and is not part of any ministries.

== History ==
Upon its independence in 1992, Kyrgyzstan took command over the former Soviet Republic's directorate of the KGB's Central Asian Border Troops District, which was part of the wider Soviet Border Troops that numbered at about 2,000 mostly Russian troops. However, in late 1992, Russia established a joint Kyrgyzstani-Russian Border Troop Command, which effectively brought the border protection responsibilities under Russian command again. The borders of Kyrgyzstan with post-Soviet states were thus mostly unguarded as the Russian Border Troops mostly concentrated on guarding the borders facing countries such as Afghanistan and China. In August 1999, the duties of border protection was finally transferred from the Border Guard Service of Russia to the Kyrgyzstani government, which would eventually set the basis for the future State Border Guard Service and the tightening of its borders with the neighbouring countries.

On 31 August 2002, the State Border Guard Service of the Kyrgyz Republic was officially established from a merger of the Main Border Guard Directorate of the Ministry of Defense and the Main Directorate of Border Control of the National Security Service, so as to have a more centralised system. Over the subsequent few years, the border guard service would be transferred to and removed from the command of the National Security Service for several times by presidential decree till on 4 September 2012, it was permanently established as an independent Public Service department within the government of the Kyrgyz Republic. Despite the similarities in the scope of work covered, the service is not under the command of the Ministry of Interior Affairs of the republic, neither is it part of the military of Kyrgyzstan. In 2020, President Sadyr Japarov put it under the State Committee for National Security.

Since the independence of the republic, it has had many disagreements and even confrontations with the border services of neighbouring countries, including those of Tajikistan and Uzbekistan. Several land border crossings with neighbouring countries have also not been consistently opened as a result. The border guard service has also because of the disagreements, taken steps to train and upgrade itself. For example in 2013, the border service took part in a joint military drill with China on the two countries' borders. Additionally it has also requested and received training and equipment from China and Turkey. In December 2021, the border services received Bayraktar TB2 UAV from Turkey.

== Commanders ==
- Tokon Mamytov (2009)
- Ularbek Sharsheev (2017-2024)
- Abdikarim Alimbaev (since 2024)

== Special Forces of the Border Service ==
The Boru Special Forces of the Border Service are deployed in the south of the republic and provide support to outposts on the border with Tajikistan and Uzbekistan, from where drug trafficking from Afghanistan occurs.

The name Boru ('Wolf') was given to the special-purpose units of the service in March 2007, after which the servicemen also received identification marks in the form of an emblem on their uniforms and stripes on a beret. The emblem is made in the form of a round shield, in the center of which is the head of a wolf. To the left and right of it are red five-pointed stars and at the top, the circle is framed by the inscription "Boru" while the bottom has the phrase "Special Forces of the Border Guard Service" in the Kyrgyz language.

== Responsibilities ==
As the border guard of the Kyrgyz Republic, its primary duty is to protect the territorial integrity of the republic by ensuring that all the borders of the republic are not compromised, be it by other nation states or criminal elements. The border guard does so by deploying troops to patrol and monitor its borders at all times by varying means. A combination of high altitude, rough terrain and an usually high number of exclaves in the republic makes border policing even more difficult. Its secondary role is to assist in immigration formalities at all entry and exit checkpoints in the country, including those at land border crossings and airports. It works together with the State Customs Service in customs formalities too.

== Border Guards Day ==
Border Guards Day is a holiday celebrated in the republic by active and ex-servicemen of the border guard service. The holiday has its roots from the Soviet times and is still celebrated on May 28. The day is set for the public to also pay tribute and understand the importance of the border guard service in the republic. The date of the holiday was shifted to 29 October 2003, but due to appeals from the veterans of the service, it was shifted back to its original date from 2005.

== Incidents ==
On 20 August 2012, at the Echilitash frontier outpost that served as the Issyk-Kul border units command headquarters, 19-year-old Kyrgyz border guard Kulbarak Balbai in a state of desertion fired at his fellow servicemen with a rifle instantly killing four; the outpost commander, senior soldier, warrant officer and junior soldier. A fifth visiting civilian wife of one of the guards was also killed as a result of the gunfire. The three other Kyrgyz guards who occupied the border crossing outpost fled in a car upon hearing the shooting take place in the main building. Kulbarak later fled the scene in a stolen car and was confronted in a nearby gorge the next day while attempting to defect to Uzbekistan. A firefight ensued between police officials and the gunman, eventually leading to Kulbarak's death. The motive although unknown is believed to be "hazing", which is the bullying of younger servicemen.
