= 2018 Qingdao SCO summit =

Annual summit in China

The 18th Meeting of the Council of Heads of State of the Shanghai Cooperation Organization
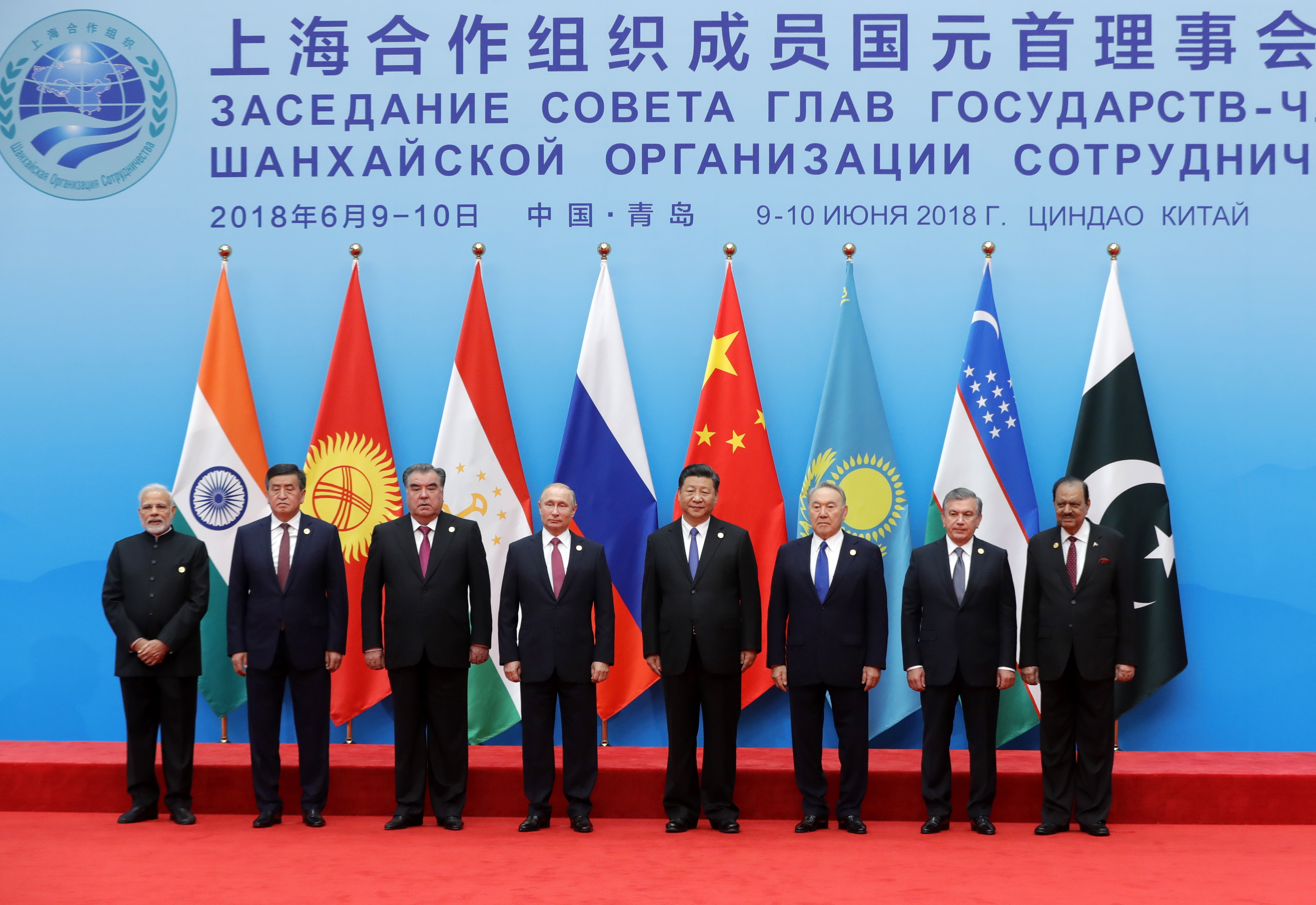
- Group photo of the summit
- Host country: China
- Date: 9–19 June 2018
- Cities: Qingdao
- Participants: China; Russia; Kazakhstan; India; Pakistan; Uzbekistan; Kyrgyzstan; Tajikistan; Belarus; Iran; Mongolia; Afghanistan
- Chair: Xi Jinping
- Follows: 2017 SCO summit
- Precedes: 2019 SCO summit
- Website: scochina.mfa.gov.cn/chn

The 2018 SCO summit was the 18th annual summit of heads of state of the Shanghai Cooperation Organisation held between 9 and 10 June 2018 in Qingdao, China. It was the fourth SCO annual summit held in China, following the Shanghai Summits in 2001 and 2006 and the Beijing Summit in 2012. Leaders of SCO member states China, Russia, Kazakhstan, Kyrgyzstan, Tajikistan, Uzbekistan, India and Pakistan, and observer states Afghanistan, Belarus, Iran and Mongolia, as well as heads of international organizations and institutions such as the United Nations were invited to attend the summit.

== Member states leaders and other dignitaries in attendance ==
=== Member states ===
- China – President of China and CCP General Secretary Xi Jinping (Note: The president of China is legally a ceremonial representative with no real power, but the general secretary of the Chinese Communist Party (de facto leader in a one-party communist state) has always held this office since 1993 except for the months of transition.)
- India – Prime Minister of India Narendra Modi
- Kazakhstan – President of Kazakhstan Nursultan Nazarbayev
- Kyrgyzstan – President of the Kyrgyz Republic Sooronbay Jeenbekov
- Pakistan – President of Pakistan Mamnoon Hussain
- Russia – President of Russia Vladimir Putin
- Tajikistan – President of Tajikistan Emomali Rahmon
- Uzbekistan – President of Uzbekistan Shavkat Mirziyoyev

=== Observer states ===
- Afghanistan – President of Afghanistan Ashraf Ghani
- Belarus – President of Belarus Alexander Lukashenko
- Mongolia – President of Mongolia Khaltmaagiin Battulga
- Iran – President of Iran Hassan Rouhani

=== International organizations ===
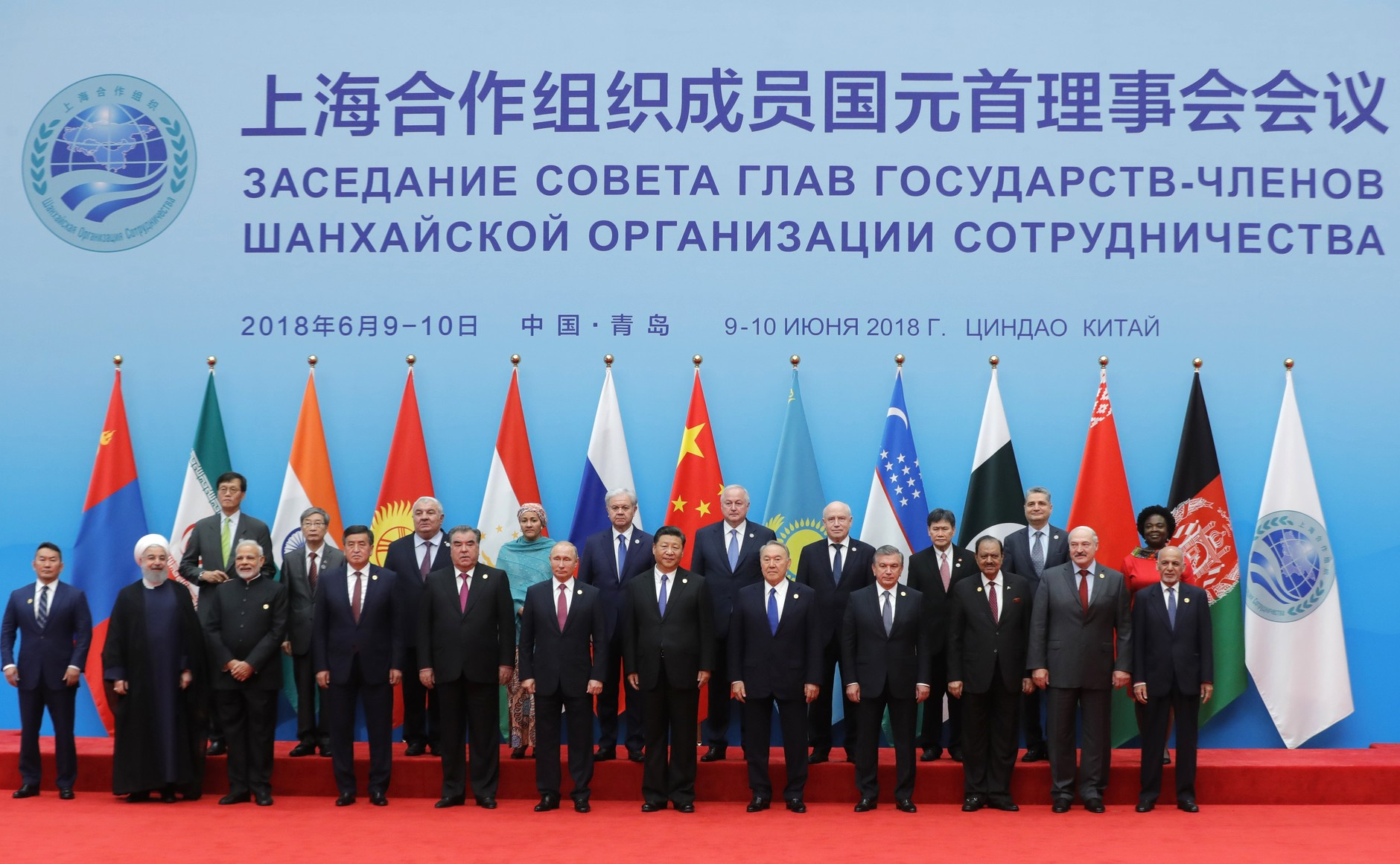
Group photo of leaders attending the Council of Heads of State

Heads of international and regional organizations such as the SCO Secretariat, the SCO Regional Anti-Terrorism Structure, ASEAN, the United Nations, the CIS, the CICA, the Collective Security Treaty Organization, the Eurasian Economic Union, the International Monetary Fund, and the World Bank also attended the summit.

== Meeting ==
=== Small-scale talks ===
At about 9 am on June 10, 2018, leaders of the Shanghai Cooperation Organization member states arrived at the Qingdao International Conference Center one after another. Xi Jinping shook hands with them one by one and then took a group photo.

Xi Jinping said that the SCO has always upheld the "Shanghai Spirit" in the face of a complex international situation. The SCO needs to actively respond to challenges, comprehensively promote cooperation in all fields, promote the steady and long-term development of the SCO, and continue to promote all-round cooperation in economy, trade, finance, agriculture, connectivity, and humanities, adhere to combating the "three forces", and maintain the development of the SCO. Xi Jinping also put forward four suggestions.

The meeting also decided that the 2019 Shanghai Cooperation Organization Summit would be held in Kyrgyzstan.

=== Heads of State Council Meeting ===
At about 11:00 a.m. on June 10, 2018, the 18th meeting of the Council of Heads of State of the Shanghai Cooperation Organization was held at the Qingdao International Conference Center. Leaders of SCO member states, heads of permanent institutions, leaders of observer states, and heads of international organizations such as the United Nations attended the meeting.

The parties exchanged views on the current status, tasks and prospects of the SCO's development, coordinated positions and reached consensus on major international and regional issues, and expressed their willingness to continue to follow the " Shanghai Spirit ", continuously consolidate practical cooperation in the political, security, economic, cultural and other fields, improve the global economic governance system, consolidate and develop the multilateral trading system, resolve regional hot issues within the framework of international law, and promote the building of a community with a shared future for mankind.

After the meeting, a press release was issued and the leaders of the member states signed the Qingdao Declaration.

=== Welcome Dinner ===
On the evening of June 9, Xi Jinping held a welcome dinner in the banquet hall of Qingdao International Conference Center (Olympic Sailing Theater). The dishes served at the dinner were mainly Confucius Mansion cuisine from Shandong cuisine, with a selection of four dishes and one soup, including Confucius Mansion Yipin Bazhen Soup, Confucius Mansion Fried Fish, Confucius Mansion Fairy Duck, Confucius Mansion Braised Beef Ribs and Confucius Mansion Vegetables. The tableware used in the dinner was designed with the main elements of the Qilu "Haidai Culture" with the themes of Mount Tai, auspicious clouds and the sea, reflecting the tolerance, openness and profoundness of Qilu culture represented by Haidai culture. Some media said that in order to respect the dietary habits of the leaders of the participating countries, all dishes were halal cuisine. However, alcoholic beverages were also provided, and Xi Jinping delivered a toast.

=== Light and fireworks performance "Friends from Afar" ===
The art performance accompanying the summit was titled "Friends from Afar", which was inspired by the first chapter of the Analects of Confucius : "It is a great pleasure to have friends from afar." The performance was directed by Zhang Yimou, lasted about 30 minutes, and was divided into seven chapters. The organizers hoped that the short performance would "display world standards, present Chinese style, and highlight Qingdao's characteristics."

Program

1. Prologue: "The Light of SCO", exploring the scenery of the Silk Road and meeting friends in Qingdao.
2. Chapter 1: "Bright Moon over the Horizon", showing the wonders of mountains and seas, and enjoying the bright moon.
3. Chapter 2: "Qi Feng Lu Yun", searching for the origins of Qi and Lu, and visiting the hometown of Confucius and Mencius.
4. Chapter Three: "Peace and Prosperity" realizes the dream of rejuvenation and celebrates the prosperity of China.
5. Chapter 4: "Building a Dream for the Future", creating an ideal future and promoting world harmony.
6. Chapter Five: "Community of Shared Future", plays the chapter of the four seasons and blooms in all colors.
7. Taking a bow

== Security ==
=== Traffic hub control ===
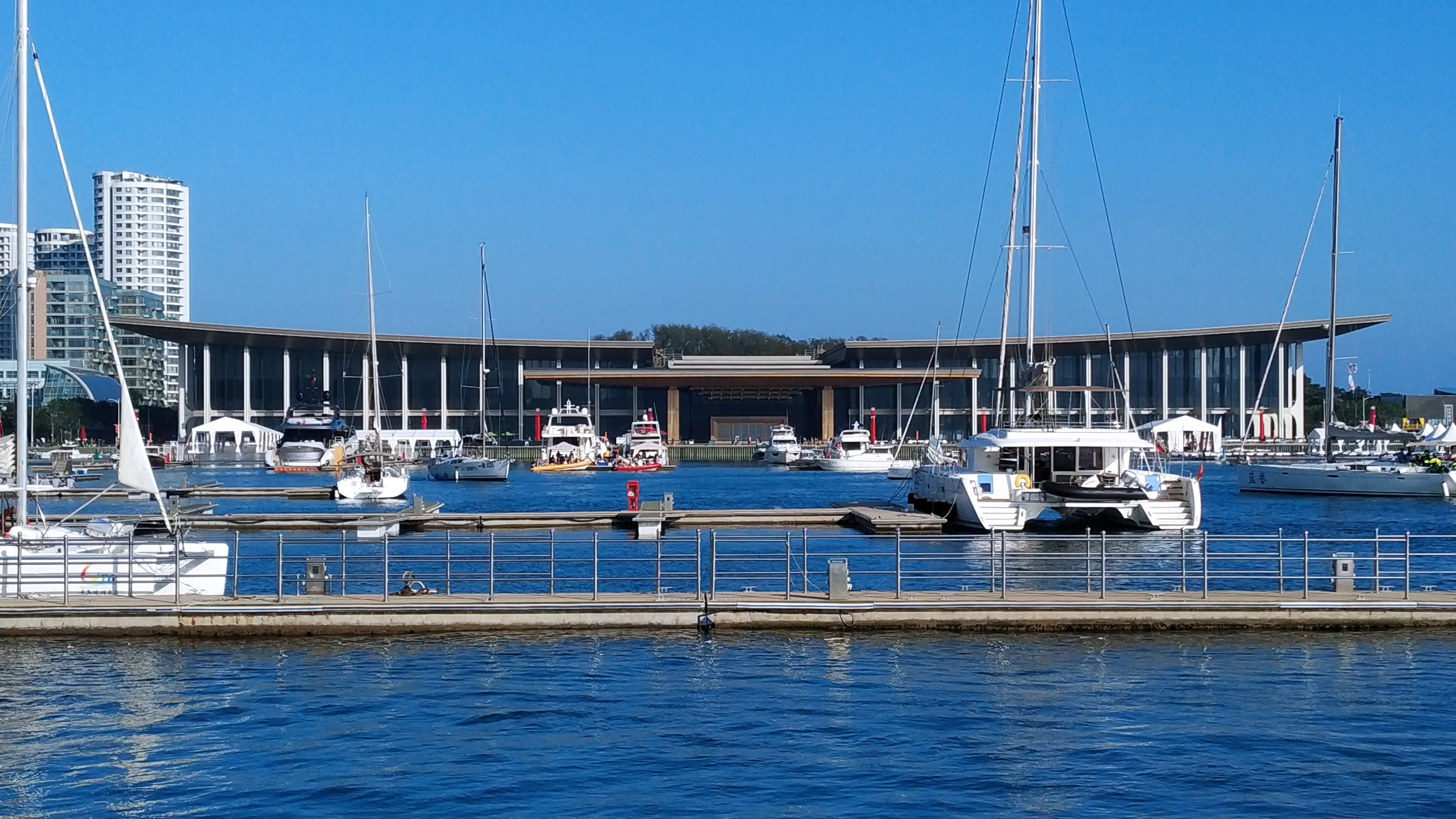
Qingdao International Conference Center

From May 26, 2018, until the end of the summit, all major railway stations in China implemented "secondary security checks" for all passengers taking trains to Qingdao. Qingdao Railway Station, Qingdao North Railway Station, Qingdao Liuting International Airport, and Qingdao Bus Terminal deployed a large number of police forces and stepped up security checks to ensure the safety of the summit.

=== Closed-off management ===
The "Notice on Taking Temporary Administrative Measures in Some Areas of the City" issued by the Qingdao Municipal People's Government on June 4, 2018, shows that from 0:00 on June 6, 2018, to 24:00 on June 10, 2018, the areas near May Fourth Square and Qingdao Olympic Sailing Center would be subject to restricted access management, and closed management would be implemented when necessary, and public security checkpoints would be set up on the main roads. Residents and unit staff in the restricted access management area must have entered after a security check with valid identity documents, and other unrelated personnel were prohibited from entering. Except for motor vehicles holding passes that enter and pass after a security check, other vehicles (including non-motor vehicles and motor vehicles) were prohibited from entering and passing. It was also prohibited to sell, transport, carry, and store items with safety hazards in this area, and other activities that affect safety were not allowed. Other media reported that residents living near the venue were asked to leave their homes before June 8 and could only return after 10 pm on June 10. The authorities provided compensation of no more than 800 RMB to those who left their homes, while those who did not want to leave were asked to close the windows of their homes, draw the curtains and seal them to avoid being misjudged by snipers arranged by the authorities.

=== Motor vehicle restrictions ===
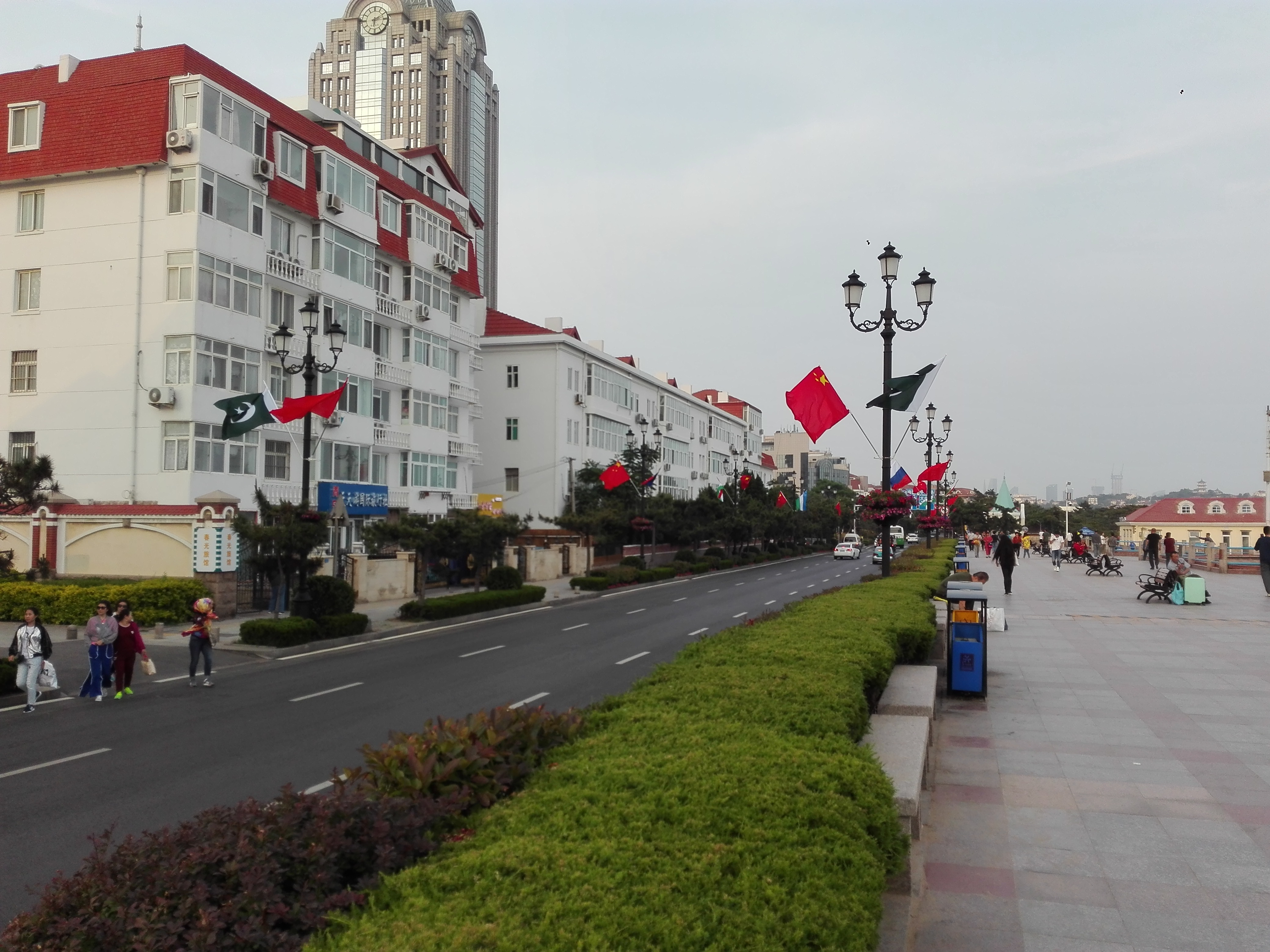
The flags of the SCO member states on Taiping Road, with the flags of China and Pakistan in the front

On May 29, 2018, the Qingdao Municipal People's Government issued the "Notice on Taking Temporary Traffic Management Measures", which stated that from 20:00 on June 8 to 24:00 on June 10, restrictions would be imposed on motor vehicles on roads in Qingdao. Among them, in Shinan District, Shibei District, Licang District, Laoshan District, Chengyang District, the entire Jiaozhou Bay Tunnel, the entire Jiaozhou Bay Bridge, and some sections of Qinglan, Qingyin, Qingxin, and Longqing Expressways, small passenger cars with local license plates (such as Lu B and Lu U) would be subject to odd-even number restrictions. Small passenger cars with out-of-town license plates were not allowed to pass through the above-mentioned areas from 0:00 on June 8 to 24:00 on June 10. Trucks, special operation vehicles, motorcycles with local license plates, and other motor vehicles with out-of-town license plates are prohibited from passing through the above-mentioned areas from 0:00 on June 6, 2018, to 24:00 on June 11, 2018. Vehicles transporting highly toxic and hazardous chemicals were prohibited from traveling within the administrative area of Qingdao from 00:00 on May 30, 2018, to 24:00 on June 11, 2018.

=== Small aircraft and airborne objects control ===
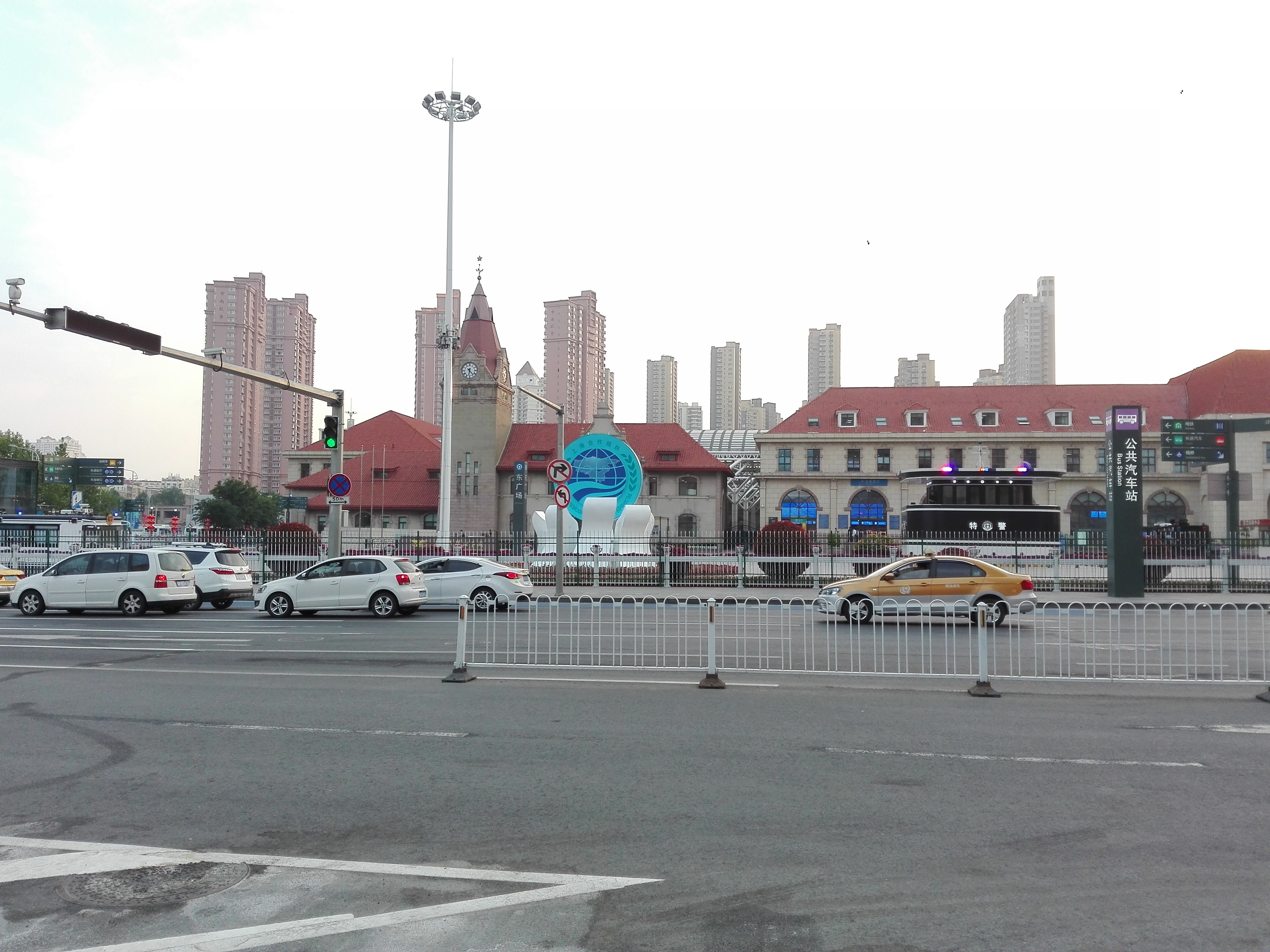
The SCO emblem on the East Square of Qingdao Station

On May 25, 2018, the Qingdao Municipal People's Government issued the "Decision on Taking Temporary Administrative Measures on Civil Small Aircraft and Airborne Objects", which announced that from May 25 to June 11, temporary management measures would be taken on small aircraft and airborne objects in Qingdao. The public security organs would contact the civil aviation, meteorological, sports, agriculture, forestry, ocean and fishery, land and resources, industry and commerce, radio, television, news and publishing departments to register small aircraft and airborne objects; they may require the relevant aircraft or airborne object holders or units to temporarily seal up the small aircraft or airborne objects they manage and use, and the public security department may directly take temporary sealing measures when necessary. In addition, from June 5 to June 11, all unauthorized small aircraft and airborne objects were prohibited from flying and launching in the administrative area of Qingdao.
