= Zhang Xinfeng =

Chinese politician

- 张新枫

Deputy Minister of Public Security
- In office March 2005 – January 2013
- Minister: Meng Jianzhu; Guo Shengkun

Personal details
- Born: August 28, 1952 (age 74) Tieling, Liaoning, China
- Party: Chinese Communist Party
- Education: Central Party School of the Chinese Communist Party

Zhang Xinfeng (simplified Chinese: 张新枫; traditional Chinese: 張新楓; pinyin: Zhāng Xīnfēng; born 28 August 1952) is a Chinese police and security official, serving since 2016 as the Special Anti-terrorism Officer of the government of the People's Republic of China. Previously he served as Assistant to the Minister and Deputy Minister of Public Security.

== Biography ==
Zhang was born in Tieling, Liaoning in August 1952.

In September 1968, Zhang was sent to Bei'an to work in May Seventh Cadre School after the Cultural Revolution was launched by Mao Zedong. In March 1976, at the close of Cultural Revolution, Zhang joined the Chinese Communist Party. He graduated from the Central Party School of the Chinese Communist Party.

Zhang got involved in politics in 1980. In 1990 he was promoted to become the deputy director of Heilongjiang Public Security Department, a position he held until 2003. In April 2003, Zhang was promoted to become the Assistant to the Minister of Public Security. In March 2005, Zhang was elevated to the Deputy Minister of Public Security. In January 2013, Zhang was elevated to head of the Anti-Terrorism Executive Commission of the Shanghai Cooperation Organisation.

In January 2016, he was named Special Officer in charge of anti-terrorism (vice-minister level). His appointment was notable due to his having long passed the age of 60, the retirement age for vice-minister level officials. This 'rule-breaking' appointment was seen as an indication that anti-terrorism work was of extremely high importance to the Chinese government.
