= Ularbek Sharsheev =

Kyrgyzstani colonel

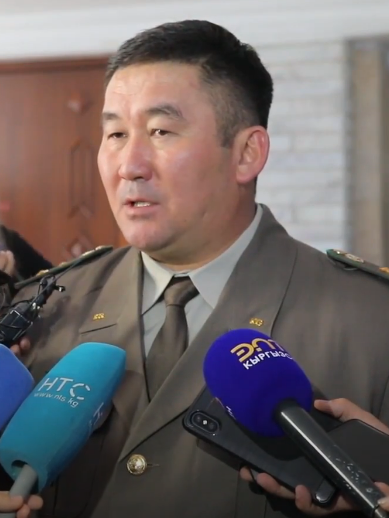
- Native name: Уларбек Шаршеев
- Born: 17 February 1974 (age 52); Kyrgyzstan
- Allegiance: Kyrgyzstan
- Branch: State Border Guard Service
- Rank: Colonel
- Commands: State Border Guard Service
- Conflicts: 2021 Kyrgyzstan–Tajikistan conflict
- Education: Tashkent Higher Combined Arms Command School

Ularbeek Zarlykovich Sharsheev (Kyrgyz: Уларбек Зарлыкович Шаршеев; born 17 February 1974) is a Kyrgyz colonel, member of the General Staff of the Armed Forces of Kyrgyz Republic and the head of the State Border Guard Service.

== Biography ==
Sharsheev graduated from the Tashkent Higher Combined Arms Command School in 1996, and began his service as a platoon commander of the Ministry of Defense. From 1999 to 2017, he served in various officer and senior positions in the State Border Service: he commanded border units, formations and the structural department of the border agency. In 2011 he graduated from the Border Guard Academy of the Federal Security Service (FSB). Since 2017, he has been serving as the head of the State Border Guard Service.

== Personal life ==
Sharsheev speaks Kyrgyz and Russian. He is married and has three children.
