= 2012 Beijing SCO summit =

12th summit of Shanghai Cooperation Organisation

2012 SCO summit
- Host country: China
- Date: 6–7 June 2012
- Cities: Beijing

The 2012 SCO summit was the 12th annual summit of the Shanghai Cooperation Organisation.

== Background ==
At the previous summit in Kazakhstan, new rules in regards to the admission of more member states were discussed, with the details expected to be clarified at this summit.

== Attending delegations ==
The heads of state of the six countries participated in the summit.

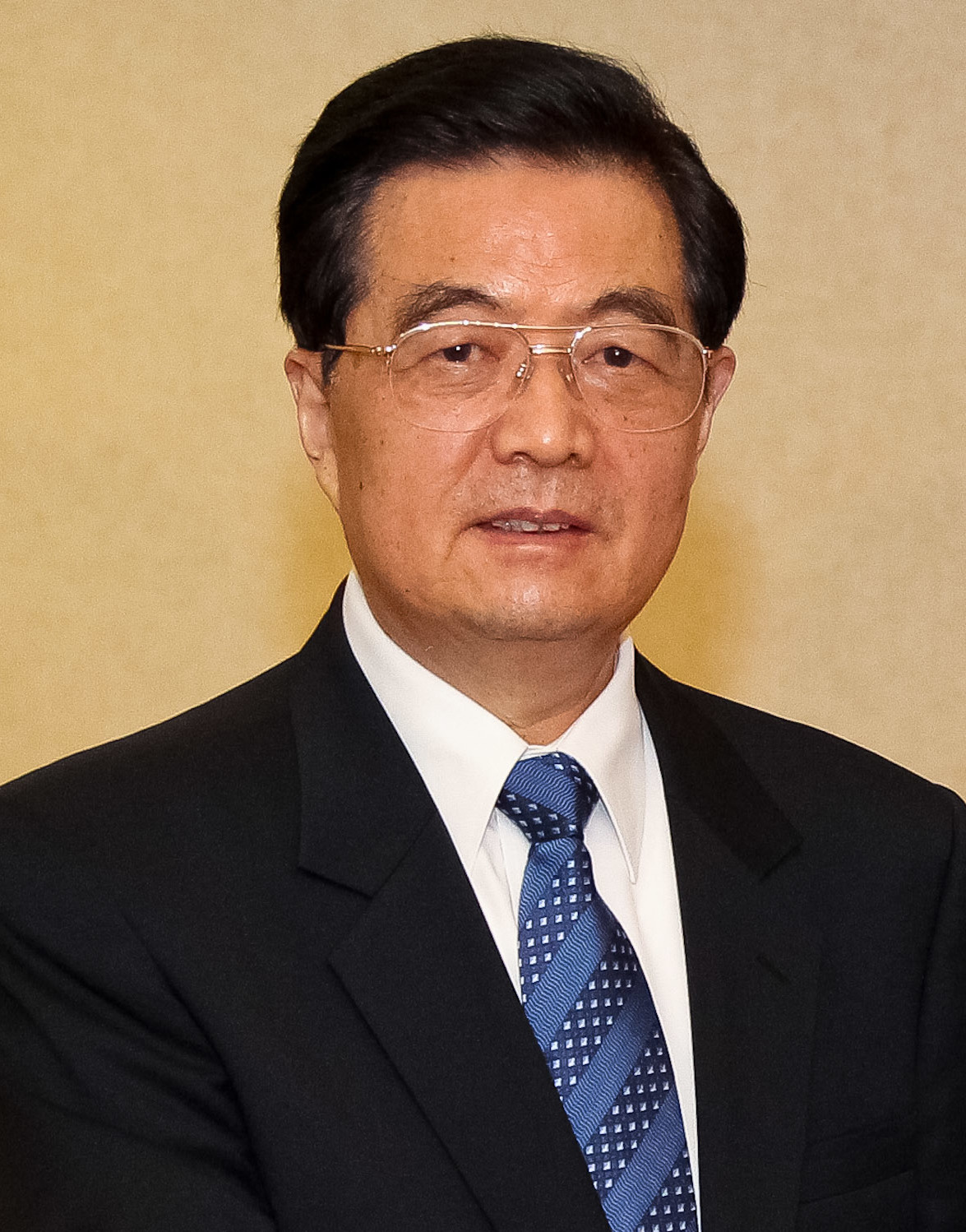
(China) Hu Jintao
CCP General Secretary and President of China
(host) (Note: The president of China is legally a ceremonial representative with no real power, but the general secretary of the Chinese Communist Party (de facto leader in a one-party communist state) has always held this office since 1993 except for the months of transition.)

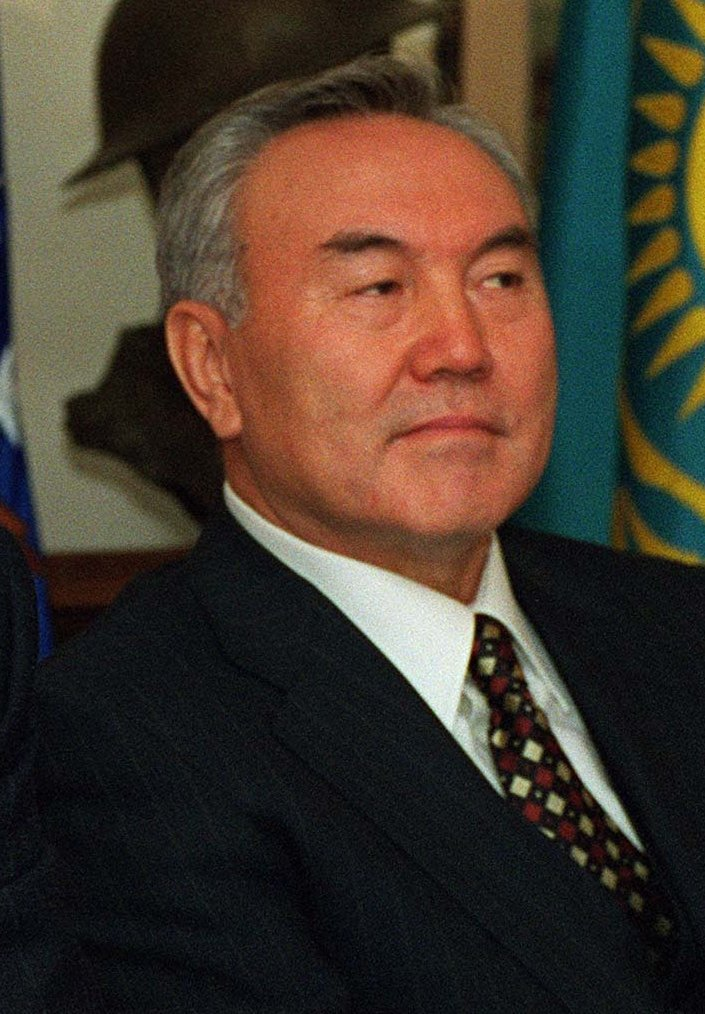
(Kazakhstan) Nursultan Nazarbayev
President of Kazakhstan

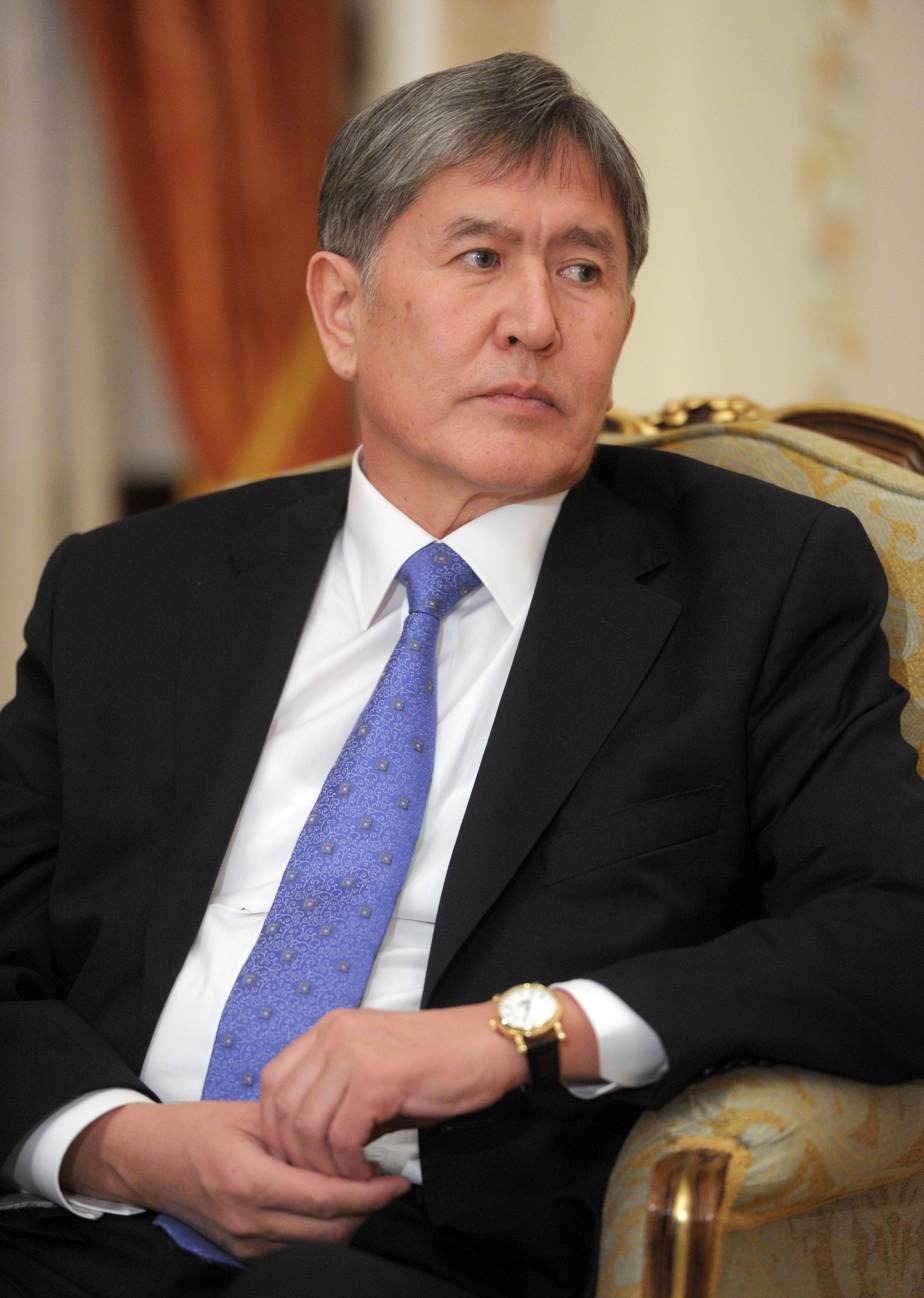
(Kyrgyzstan) Almazbek Atambayev
President of Kyrgyzstan

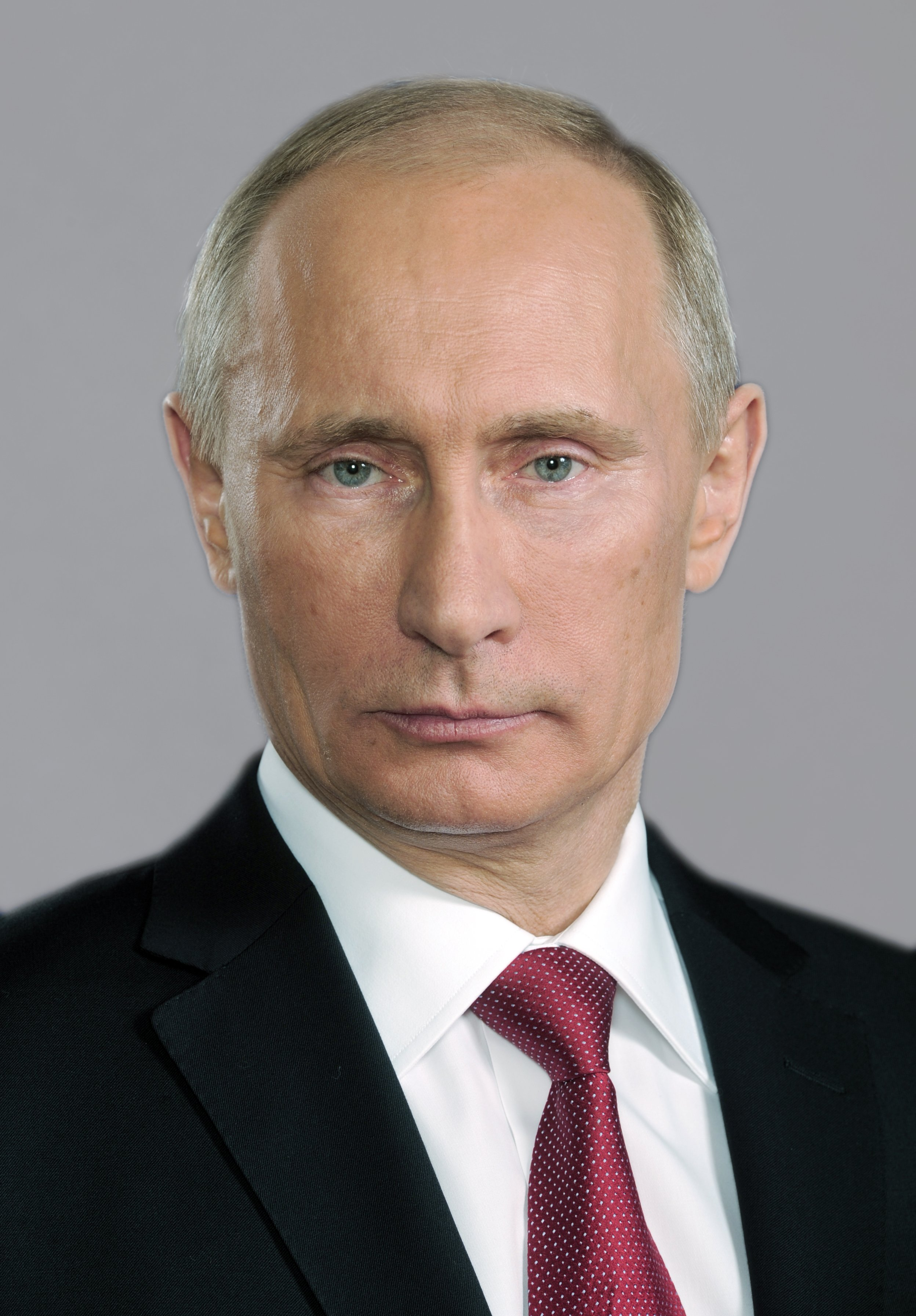
(Russia) Vladimir Putin
President of Russia

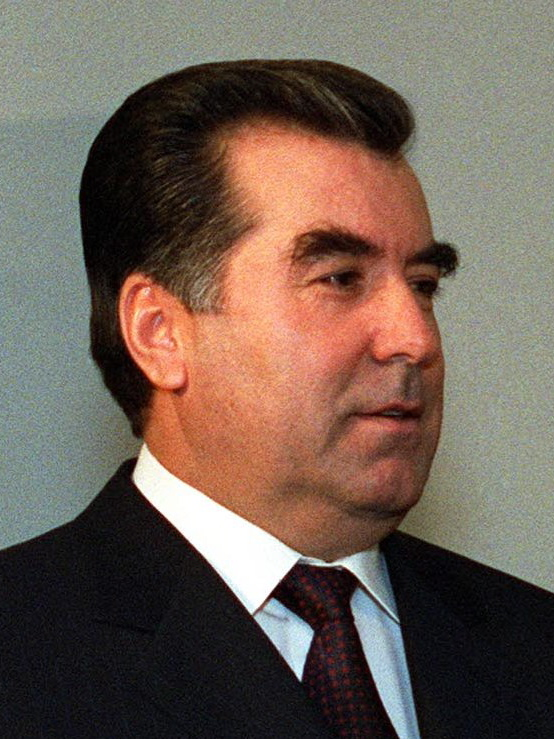
(Tajikistan) Emomali Rahmon
President of Tajikistan

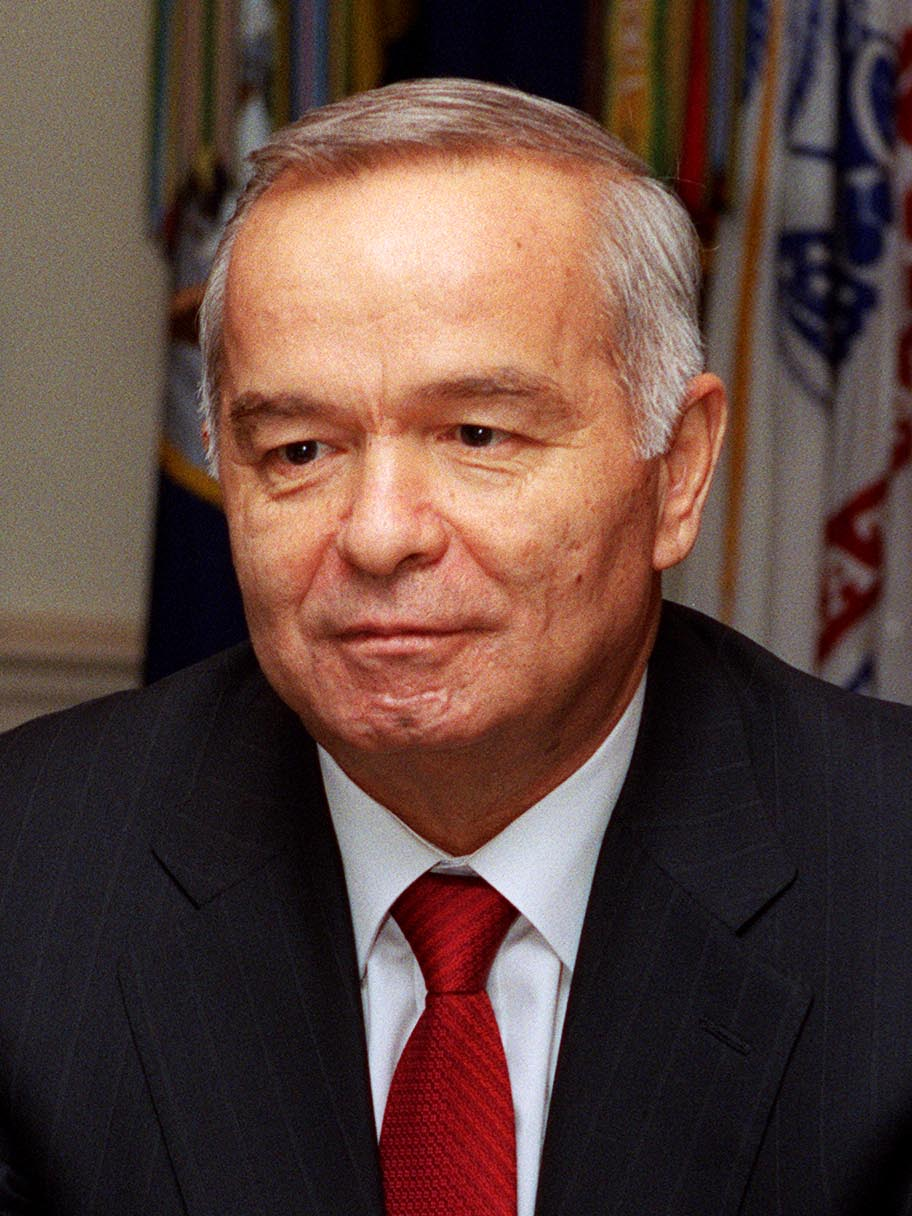
(Uzbekistan) Islam Karimov
President of Uzbekistan

The other state delegations are led by:

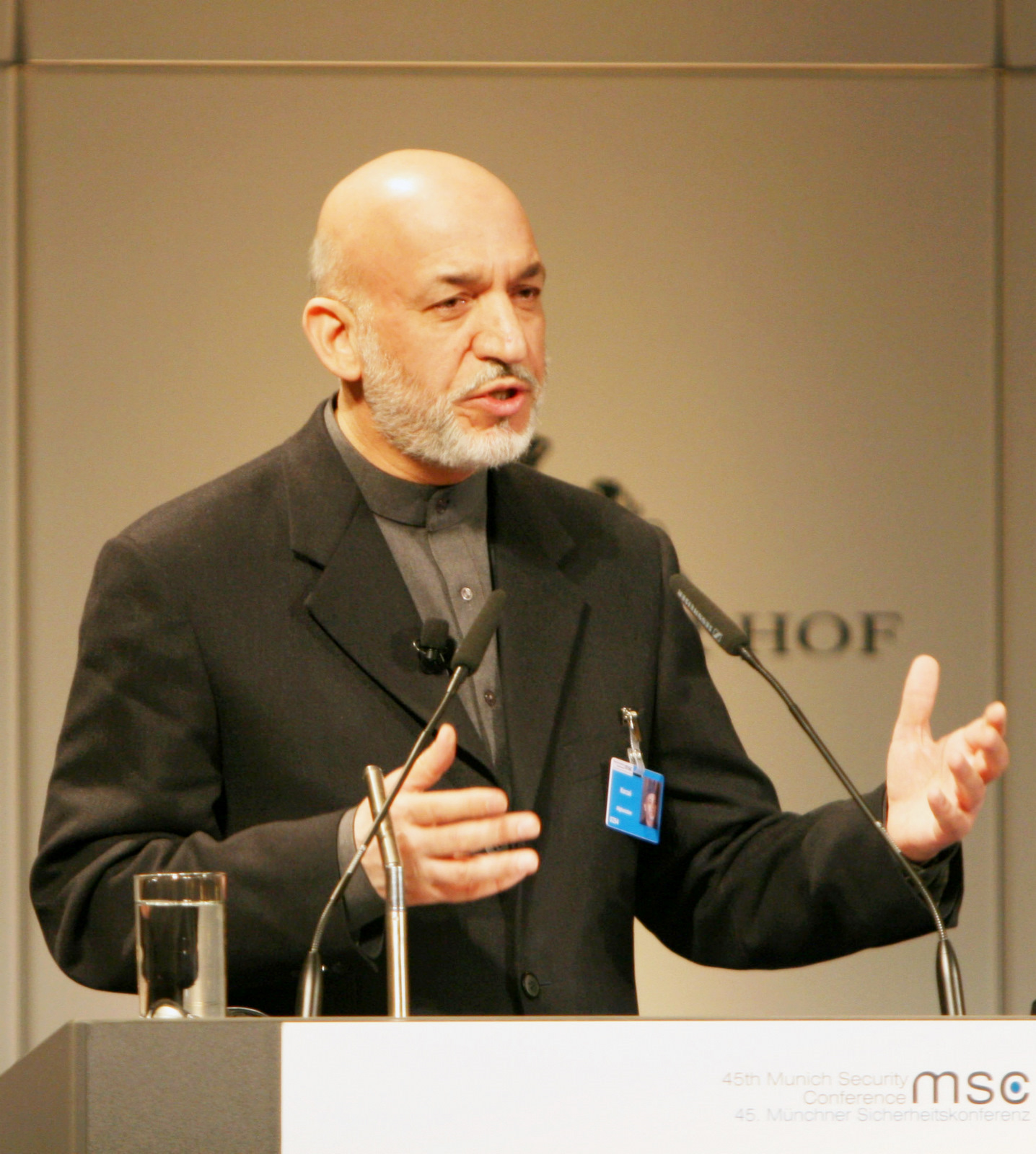
(Afghanistan) Hamid Karzai President of Afghanistan

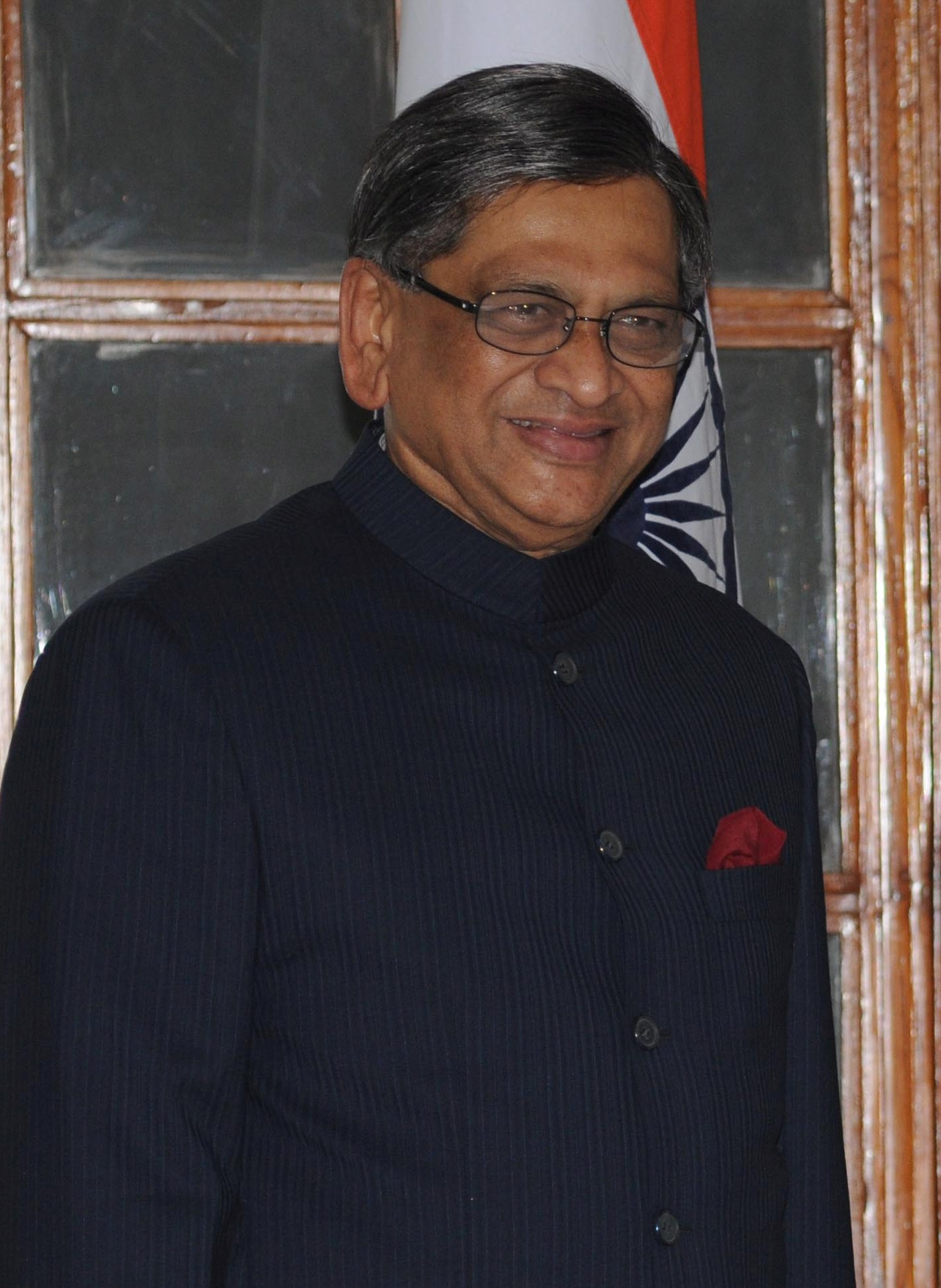
(India) S.M. Krishna
Foreign Minister of India

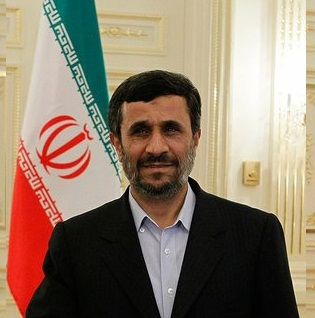
(Iran) Mahmoud Ahmadinejad
President of Iran

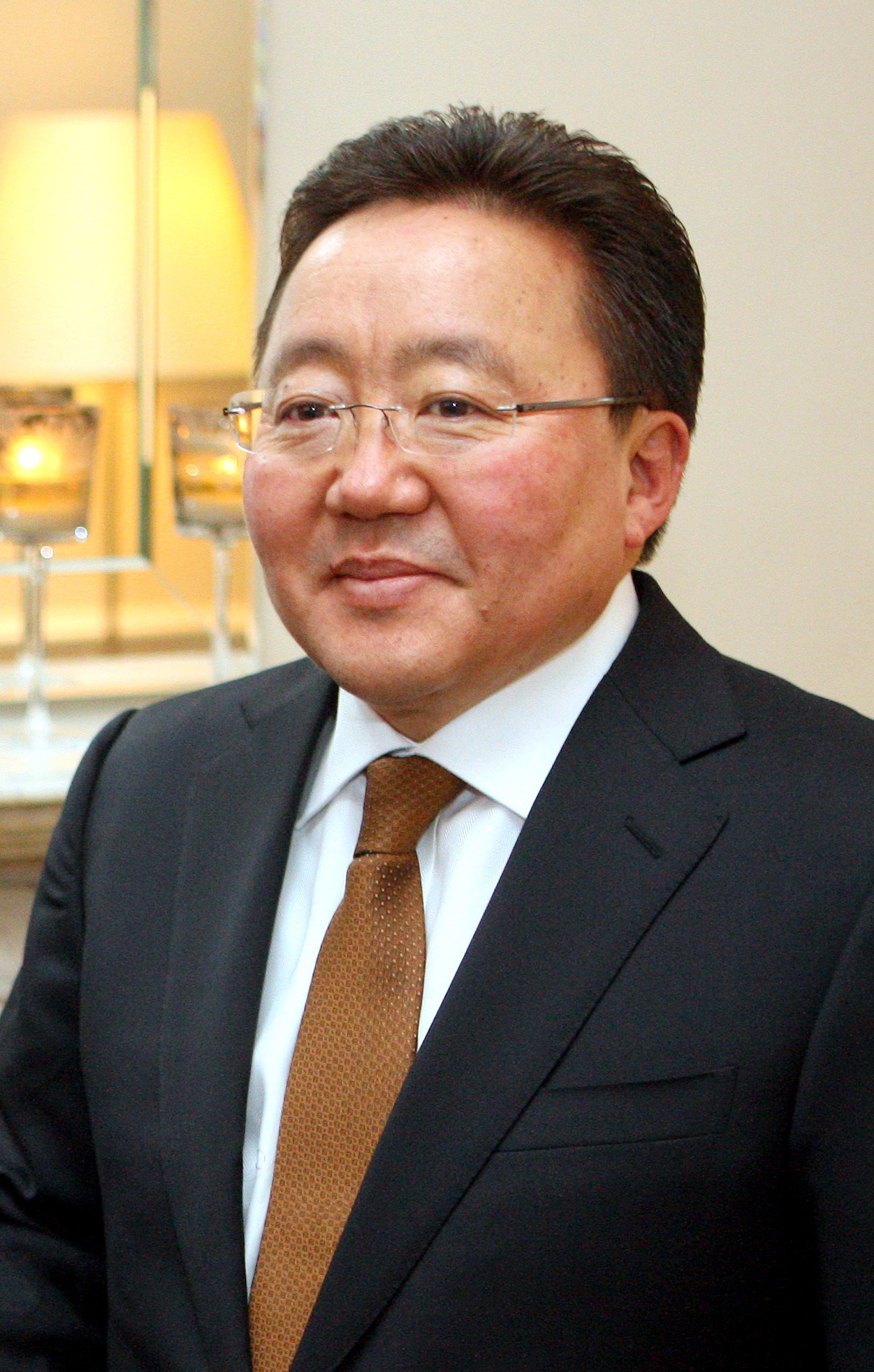
(Mongolia) Tsakhiagiin Elbegdorj
President of Mongolia

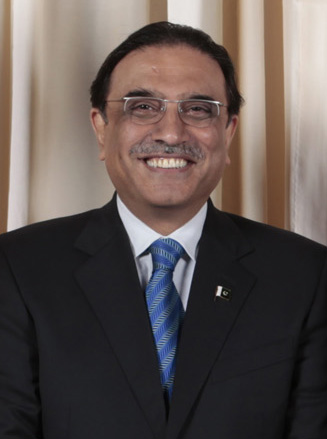
(Pakistan) Asif Ali Zardari
President of Pakistan

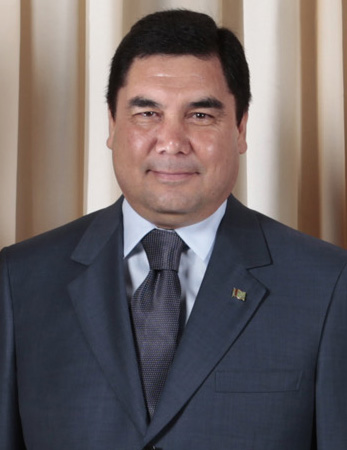
(Turkmenistan) Gurbanguly Berdimuhamedow
President of Turkmenistan

The Putin-led Russian delegation included: Foreign Minister Sergey Lavrov and five other cabinet ministers and the head of Gazprom, Viktor Zubkov, as well from other energy companies. The delegation was welcomed by Vice Foreign Minister Zhang Zhijun.

== Agenda ==
The agenda included discussions about the Syrian uprising and criticism by the Western world of Russia and China's approach towards sanctioning the government of Syria. Host Chinese leader Hu Jintao also said that the SCO would support a security paradigm that would give its member states sovereignty over what is deemed to be its own interests in accordance with individual state's conditions. It also sought to counter "interventionism."

Rules for the admission of further member states were expected to be issued. Turkey was considered for admission as a "dialogue partner" and Afghanistan joined as an "observer." China did not object to either states citing their status as "NATO-friendly countries." Afghanistan is already currently involved as part of the SCO-Afghanistan Contact Group, which is working on reconstruction projects in the country. However, Vice Foreign Minister Cheng Guoping said the observers were unlikely to become full members as yet due to expectations for more "preparatory work," though the current members would maintain an "open attitude" towards future relations:

The relevant countries should work hard towards political, legal and technical preparations for [membership]. The relevant work is going on about expansion of membership. The decision should be made through consensus and consultation, and no timetable should be set. That is to say, when the conditions are ripe, the decision should be made through consensus.

The founding ethos for the SCO, counter-terrorism, was also expected to be high on the agenda.

Other issues suggested for discussion were a bigger role for SCO after NATO withdraws its forces following the War in Afghanistan (which could be enhanced by Afghanistan's acceptance as an observer) and in working towards a solution to Iran's nuclear programme, for which a statement criticising further international sanctions would be issued. Cheng also said that a road transport agreement would be signed, while discussions would continue in order to develop a financing safeguard mechanism and an SCO development bank.

=== Non-member initiatives ===
India sought to work with the Uzbekistan-based Regional Counter-Terrorism Structure, participate in discussions with the other trade ministers and coordinate its own work with the SCO over reconstruction efforts in Afghanistan, more so after the announced phased withdrawal of ISAF troops from that country, in what Russian Foreign Minister Sergei Lavrov called the "economic and political revival of Afghanistan."

== Schedule ==
On 6 June, a group meeting between the six member states was scheduled in Beijing. The next day a larger meeting, business summit and a signing ceremony to conclude the summit was scheduled.

== Discussions ==
At the start of the summit, Hu said: "We will continue to manage regional affairs by ourselves, guarding against shocks from turbulence outside the region. We will play a bigger role in Afghanistan's peaceful reconstruction. We'll strengthen communication, co-ordination and co-operation in dealing with major international and regional issues."

=== Conclusions ===
Host leader Hu Jintao announced the conclusions to the summit as including:

- Afghanistan and Turkey were included in the roles they were expected to have done as observer and dialogue partner, respectively.
- Vows to foster and facilitate trade and investment.
- Vows to enhance cooperation in the finance, transportation, energy, telecommunications and agriculture sectors in line with a furtherance of regional economic development
- Pursue the establishment of a Special Account and Development Bank.
- Approval of a development strategic plan.
- Vows to increase capacity to deal with crises situations such as terrorism, separatism, extremism and transnational crime and make the SCO a "reliable guarantor of regional security."
- Agreement on the necessity to enhance cultural and educational exchanges and create opportunities for more people-to-people contact.
- Further cooperation with observer states and dialogue partners, the United Nations and other affiliates, including international and regional organisations.

There were also ten agreements that were signed, including the Declaration on Building a Region with Lasting Peace and Common Prosperity, the Strategic Plan for the Medium-Term Development of the Shanghai Cooperation Organisation, as well as agreeing to unify the SCO's response to regional security threats. Hu then further told the summit delegations that "we should enhance consultations with international and regional organizations through the platform to safeguard peace, promote development and boost world multipolarization and democratization of international relations." Kyrgyzstan then took over the rotating presidency of the organisation the next day.

== Bilateral meetings ==
The day prior to the commencement of the summit featured Russian President Vladimir Putin and host Chinese leader Hu Jintao present for the signing of bilateral cooperation agreements in the fields of energy, industry, innovation technologies and tourism, as well an agreement to deepen China-Russia relations and strategic cooperation. Putin was scheduled to meet China's chairman of the Committee of the National People's Congress Wu Bangguo, Premier Wen Jiabao, Vice President Xi Jinping and Vice Premier Li Keqiang. Russian Foreign Minister Sergei Lavrov said that Putin decision to come to China as part of one of his foreign visits as president was indicative of burgeoning relations between the two countries. China's Wen Jiabao met Kyrgyz President Almazbek Atambayev and discussed Kyrgyzstani stability and development. Wen said that the two states would work towards developing infrastructure in railways, energy and trade relations with an increase in the exchange of persons between the two countries. Atambayev added that he appreciated China's support and that Kyrgyzstan was working to enhance cooperation with China in the spheres trade, transportation, energy, agriculture and security. Hu also met Kazakhstan's Nursultan Nazarbayev with him whom he pledged to enhance their "strategic partnership." Nazarbayev also met Jinping. The same pledges were made by Hu with Tajikistan's Emomali Rahmon, specifically in the sectors of energy, resources, infrastructure, agriculture and security. Rahmon also said that China National Petroleum Corporation was invited to explore for both crude oil and natural gas in Tajikistan following the signing of an agreement on 5 June. He also signed an agreement with China for a US#50 million loan for a road construction project, as well as inviting Zijin Mining Group Company Limited to explore for copper.

Afghan President Hamid Karzai said that Afghanistan and China would sign a preliminary agreement for the "creation of a strategic partnership" and work towards deepening relations. Putin was also scheduled to meet with his Iranian and Afghani counterparts. The latter two would also hold talks with their Chinese counterpart. Indian Foreign Minister S. M. Krishna is scheduled to meet Chinese Vice-Premier Li Keqiang to discuss border issues and the incarceration of Indian nationals in China.

== Reactions ==
Al Jazeera asked if the budding relationship between China and Russia would be akin to a "NATO of the east."
