= Plan on reforming Party and state institutions =

2023 institutional reforms in China

The plan on reforming Party and state institutions (Chinese: 党和国家机构改革方案; pinyin: Dǎng hé guójiā jīgòu gǎigé fāng'àn) was a large-scale reform of the institutions of the Chinese Communist Party (CCP) and the People's Republic of China (PRC) that was initiated by the 20th CCP Central Committee in 2023. It is a continuation of the deepening the reform of the Party and state institutions in 2018. The CCP Central Committee required that, under the leadership of the Politburo Standing Committee, the Central Comprehensively Deepening Reforms Commission coordinate the organization and implementation of the plan on reforming Party and state institutions. The local institutional reform were led by the provincial Party committees, and the reform plan were submitted to the Central Committee for record. The reform tasks at the central level were completed by the end of 2023, and the reform tasks at the local level were completed by the end of 2024.

== History ==
The second plenary session of the 20th CCP Central Committee was held in Beijing from February 26 to 28, 2023. The plenary session reviewed and approved the "Plan for the Reform of Party and State Institutions". In March 2023, the CP Central Committee issued the "Reform Plan for Party and State Institutions", requiring that "the reform tasks at the central level should be completed by the end of 2023, and the reform tasks at the local level should be completed by the end of 2024."

== Specific reforms ==
=== Central Committee of the Chinese Communist Party ===
1. The Central Financial Commission and its office were established and the Financial Stability and Development Committee and its office were abolished.
2. The Central Financial Work Commission was established. The Party construction responsibilities of the Central and State Organs Working Committees in the financial system will be transferred to the Central Financial Work Committee.
3. The Central Science and Technology Commission was established and the Central National Laboratory Construction Leading Group, the National Science and Technology Leading Group, the National Science and Technology System Reform and Innovation System Construction Leading Group, the National Medium- and Long-Term Science and Technology Development Planning Leading Group and their offices were abolished. The responsibilities of the Central Science and Technology Commission's office was assumed by the reorganized Ministry of Science and Technology. The National Science and Technology Advisory Committee was to serve the Central Committee's major science and technology decisions, and was made responsible to and report to the Central Science and Technology Commission. The National Science and Technology Ethics Committee, as an academic and professional expert committee under the leadership of the Central Science and Technology Commission, no longer served as a deliberative and coordination agency of the State Council. Provincial Party Committee science and technology deliberative and coordination agencies were established.
4. The Society Work Department was established. The National Public Complaints and Proposals Administration was placed directly under the State Council, previously being subordinate to its General Office, and put under the leadership of the department. The Society Work Department transferred to the Ministry of Civil Affairs the responsibilities of guiding the construction of urban and rural community governance systems and governance capabilities, formulating social work policies, and coordinating and promoting the Party-building leading grassroots governance and grassroots political power building. It also transferred the responsibilities of Party building of national industry associations and chambers of commerce, which are borne by the Working Committee of Central and State Organs and the Party Committee of the State-owned Assets Supervision and Administration Commission of the State Council, and the responsibilities of coordinating the planning, coordination, guidance, supervision and inspection of national volunteer service work to the Office of the Central Guidance Commission on Building Spiritual Civilization. Provincial, municipal and county party committees established social work departments, and the responsibilities of the "two new" working committees were correspondingly incorporated into the organization departments of the party committees at the same level.
5. The Hong Kong and Macao Affairs Office was established on the basis of State Council's Hong Kong and Macao Affairs Office. The HKMAO turned into an external name of the work office under the arrangement "one institution with two names".

=== State Council ===
1. The Ministry of Science and Technology was reorganized, and its responsibilities for organizing and formulating science and technology plans and policies to promote agricultural and rural development, and guiding rural scientific and technological progress were transferred to the Ministry of Agriculture and Rural Affairs. The Ministry of Science and Technology's responsibilities for organizing and formulating science and technology plans and policies to promote social development were assigned to the National Development and Reform Commission, the Ministry of Ecology and Environment, the National Health Commission and other departments. The Ministry of Science and Technology's responsibilities for organizing and formulating high-tech development and industrialization plans and policies, guiding the construction of science and technology parks such as national independent innovation demonstration zones and national high-tech industrial development zones, and guiding the development of science and technology services, technology markets, and science and technology intermediary organizations were transferred to the Ministry of Industry and Information Technology. The Ministry of Science and Technology's responsibilities for introducing foreign intelligence were transferred to the Ministry of Human Resources and Social Security, and the Ministry of Human Resources and Social Security was given the name of the State Administration of Foreign Experts Affairs. The China Rural Technology Development Center under the Ministry of Science and Technology was transferred to the Ministry of Agriculture and Rural Affairs, the China Biotechnology Development Center to the National Health Commission, and the China 21st Century Agenda Management Center and the High Technology Research and Development Center of the Ministry of Science and Technology to the National Natural Science Foundation of China.
2. The National Financial Regulatory Administration was established.
3. Deepening the reform of local financial regulatory system.
4. The China Securities Regulatory Commission was adjusted to be an agency directly under the State Council.
5. Coordinated promotion of the reform of the People's Bank of China branches.
6. Improve the management system of state-owned financial capital.
7. Strengthen unified and standardized management of financial management department staff.
8. The National Data Administration was established under the National Development and Reform Commission. The responsibilities of the Office of the Central Cyberspace Affairs Commission for researching and formulating plans for the construction of Digital China, coordinating the promotion of informatization of public services and social governance, coordinating the promotion of smart city construction, coordinating the development, utilization and sharing of important national information resources, and promoting the interconnection and interoperability of information resources across industries and departments was transferred to the National Data Bureau. The responsibilities of the National Development and Reform Commission for coordinating the promotion of digital economic development, organizing and implementing the national big data strategy, promoting the construction of basic systems for data elements, and promoting the layout and construction of digital infrastructure was transferred to the National Data Bureau.
9. Optimizing the responsibilities of the Ministry of Agriculture and Rural Affairs.
10. Improve the work system for the elderly.
11. Improve the intellectual property management system.
12. The National Public Complaints and Proposals Administration was restructured into an agency directly under the State Council.
13. The staffing of the central state organs were streamlined. The staffing of each department of the central state organs were uniformly reduced by 5%. The recovered staff were mainly used to strengthen key areas and important tasks.

=== National People's Congress ===
1. The Deputies Affairs Commission of the Standing Committee of the National People's Congress was established.

=== Chinese People's Political Consultative Conference ===
1. The Environment and Resources Sector was added to the National Committee of the Chinese People's Political Consultative Conference. The Communist Youth League of China and All-China Youth Federation sectors were integrated to establish the Communist Youth League of China and All-China Youth Federation sector. The composition of the Specially Invited Persons sector members was optimized.

=== Allocation of organizational resources ===
1. The resources of all departments of the central and state organs were uniformly reduced by 5%, and the recovered establishment were mainly used to strengthen key areas and important work. Central vertical management dispatched agencies and overseas agencies were not included in the unified reduction scope. According to the actual situation of the industry and system, the existing establishment resources were used well. The establishment reduction of local party and government organs were determined by the party committees of provinces (autonomous regions, and municipalities directly under the central government) based on actual conditions. No reduction requirements were made at the county and township levels.
