= 2025 Tianjin SCO summit =

25th heads of state summit of the Shanghai Cooperation Organization

2025 SCO summit
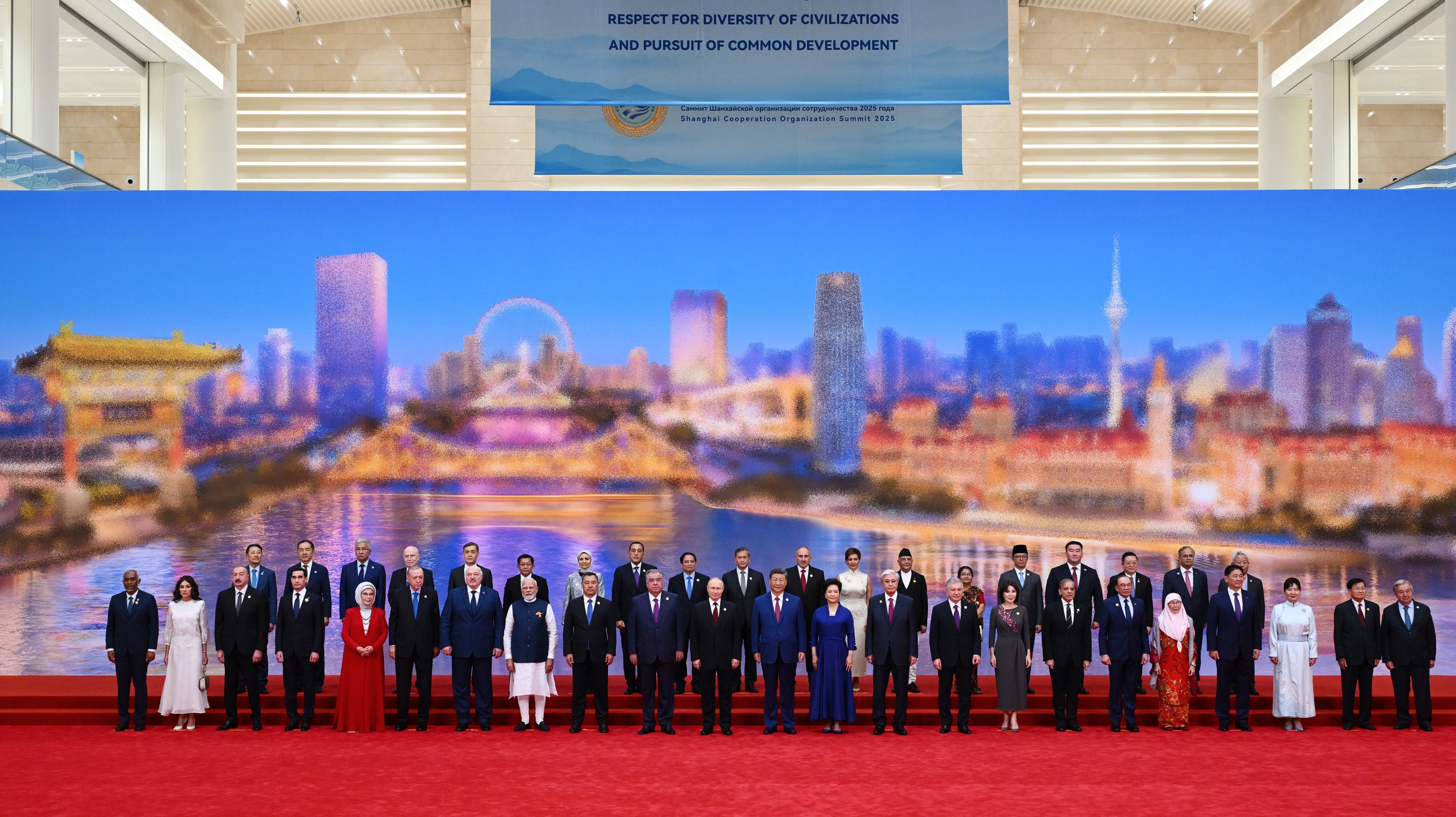
- A reception and concert program in honor of heads of state and government and their spouses at the SCO summit
- Host country: China
- Date: 31 August to 1 September 2025
- Cities: Tianjin
- Participants: China India; Belarus; Iran; Kazakhstan; Kyrgyzstan; Pakistan; Russia; Tajikistan; Uzbekistan; Mongolia; Turkmenistan; Armenia; Azerbaijan; Cambodia; Egypt; Myanmar; Maldives; Nepal; Turkey; Indonesia; Laos; Malaysia Vietnam
- Chair: Xi Jinping
- Follows: 2024 SCO summit
- Precedes: 2026 Bishkek SCO summit
- Website: www.scochina2025.org.cn/en

The SCO Tianjin Summit 2025 was the 25th Heads of State Council meeting of the Shanghai Cooperation Organization (SCO), which was held from 31 August to 1 September 2025, in Tianjin, China. It was the largest summit in SCO's history, and was the fifth time that China hosted the meeting.

The main venue for the Summit was the Tianjin Meijiang Convention and Exhibition Center.

== Preparations ==
On 2 January 2025, China unveiled the logo for its tenure as the rotating chair of the Shanghai Cooperation Organization (SCO) for 2024–2025.

On 7 March 2025, Wang Yi, member of the 20th Politburo of the Chinese Communist Party (CCP) and director of the Office of the Central Foreign Affairs Commission of the CCP, stated at a press briefing on foreign affairs during the 3rd session of the 14th National People's Congress that China will host the SCO summit in Tianjin in autumn 2025. Leaders will gather by the Hai River.

On 13 March 2025, a mobilization meeting was held in Tianjin to kick-start preparations for the 2025 SCO Summit. Chen Min'er, Party Secretary of Tianjin and head of the Preparatory Working Group, attended and delivered remarks. Zhang Gong, the Chinese Communist Party Deputy Committee Secretary of Tianjin and Mayor, and Liu Bin, a member of the Foreign Ministry CCP Committee and assistant minister, also participated.

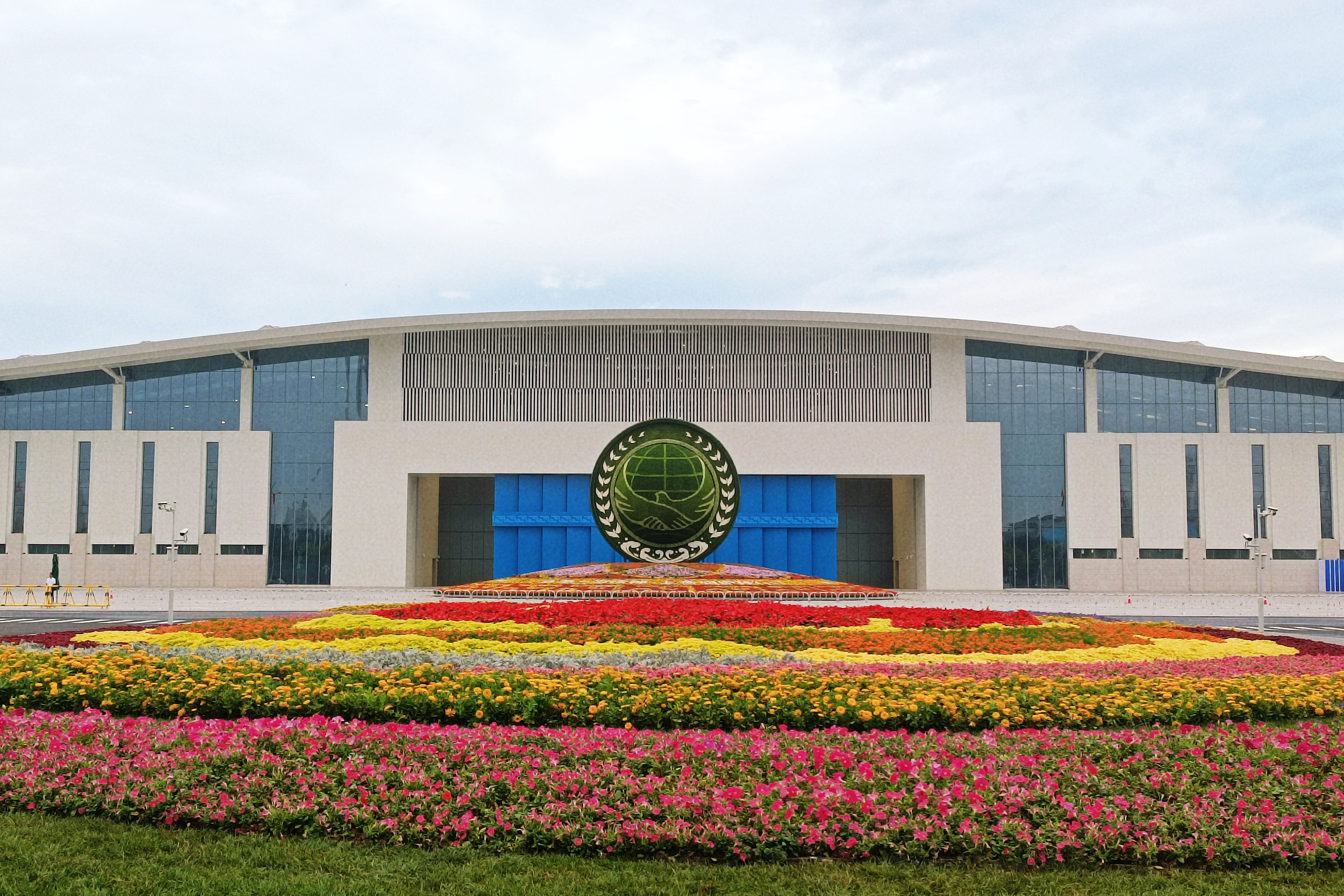
Tianjin Meijiang Convention and Exhibition Center

On 15 July 2025, the SCO Council of Foreign Ministers meeting was held in Tianjin. After the session, China announced that the SCO Summit would take place from 31 August to 1 September 2025, in Tianjin.

In 2025, in preparation for the 2025 Shanghai Cooperation Organization Tianjin Summit, Phase I of the Meijiang Convention and Exhibition Center underwent renovations as the main venue. At the same time, the Tianjin Water Authority constructed and upgraded two nearby stormwater pumping stations and associated pipelines to enhance drainage capacity in the surrounding area.

In 2025, in preparation for the SCO Summit, Tianjin implemented the Haihe River Nightscape Enhancement Project. This comprehensive initiative involved the meticulous upgrading of light environments across 217 buildings, 14 bridges, 8.2 kilometers of shoreline, and 7 piers.

The 2025 Shanghai Cooperation Organisation Summit has recruited 998 young volunteers from ten universities including Tianjin University, Nankai University, and Tianjin Foreign Studies University. These volunteers will provide services across more than 50 types of positions, including guest reception, station greetings, credential registration, and material distribution.

== SCO Series Events ==
On 11 July 2025, the SCO Digital Economy Forum was held in Tianjin. The forum was organized by the National Data Bureau and the Tianjin Municipal People's Government, attracting over 1,500 guests from SCO member states' governments, enterprises, universities, and think tanks.

On 15 July, the Council of Foreign Ministers of the SCO member states convened in Tianjin. The meeting was chaired by Chinese Foreign Minister Wang Yi, and attended by the foreign ministers of nine countries: Belarus, India, Iran, Kazakhstan, Kyrgyzstan, Pakistan, Russia, Tajikistan, and Uzbekistan, as well as the SCO Secretary-General and the Director of the Regional Anti-Terrorist Structure. The meeting fully prepared for the upcoming Tianjin Summit and reviewed and signed key documents including the draft "Tianjin Declaration of the Council of Heads of State" and the draft "SCO Development Strategy for the Next Ten Years".

On 16 July, the 2nd SCO National Television Festival opened in Xi'an, jointly organized by the National Radio and Television Administration, the Shaanxi Provincial People's Government, and the SCO Secretariat. Approximately 300 representatives from the broadcasting authorities, television media, enterprises, universities, think tanks, international organizations, and diplomatic missions in China from 19 SCO member, observer, and dialogue partner countries attended the opening ceremony.

On 17 July, the SCO Business Forum was held in Beijing, hosted by the CCPIT. The forum released the "SCO Supply Chain Development Research Report," with nearly 400 representatives from domestic and international government agencies and the business sector in attendance.

On 23 July, the SCO National Dialogue on Civilization took place in Tianjin, co-hosted by the State Council Information Office, the China Foreign Languages Publishing and Distribution Administration, and the SCO Secretariat. More than 300 guests from multiple countries' governments, think tanks, and cultural and educational sectors attended.

On 25 July, the SCO Media and Think Tank Summit held its plenary session in Zhengzhou, with over 400 domestic and foreign guests representing nearly 200 media outlets, think tanks, government agencies, and international and regional organizations from SCO member, observer, and dialogue partner countries in attendance.

On 30 July, the 10th SCO Council of Ministers of Agriculture meeting was held in Kunming. The meeting focused on rural development, poverty reduction cooperation, and technological exchange, and adopted the "Joint Statement of the 10th SCO Council of Ministers of Agriculture".

On 28 August, the press center for the 2025 SCO Summit, located at Tianjin Meijiang Convention and Exhibition Center, officially opened.

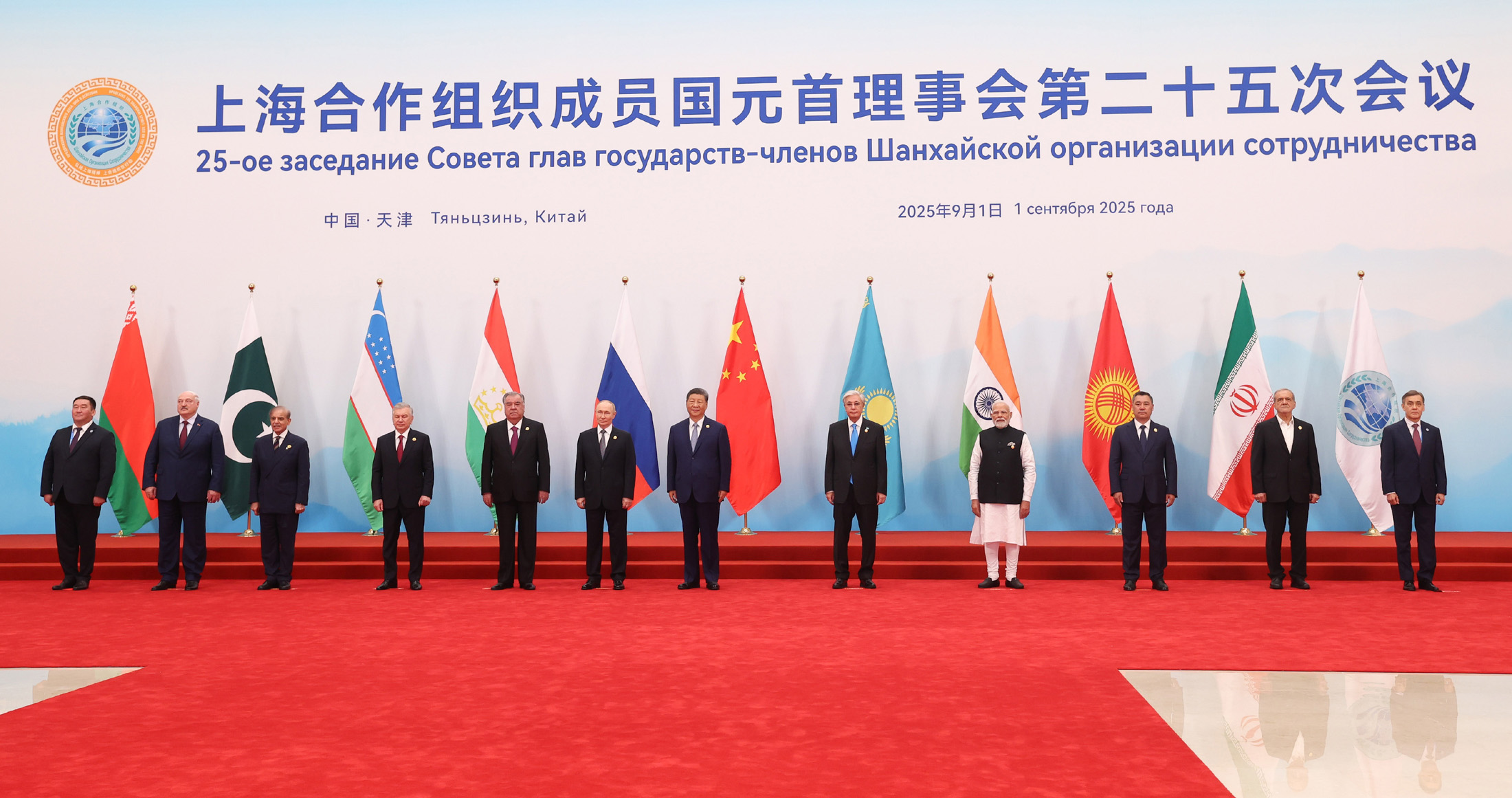
Family Photograph of SCO Members

== Participation of International Guests ==
- Armenia - Prime Minister of Armenia Nikol Pashinyan
- Azerbaijan - President of Azerbaijan Ilham Aliyev
- Belarus – President of Belarus Alexander Lukashenko
- Cambodia – Prime Minister of Cambodia Hun Manet
- China – CCP General Secretary and President of China Xi Jinping (host) (Note: The president of China is legally a ceremonial representative with no real power, but the general secretary of the Chinese Communist Party (de facto leader in a one-party communist state) has always held this office since 1993 except for the months of transition.)
- Egypt - Prime Minister of Egypt Mostafa Madbouly
- Maldives – President of the Maldives Mohamed Muizzu
- Myanmar - acting President of Myanmar and Min Aung Hlaing (Note: Also the Chairman of the State Security and Peace Commission and Commander-in-Chief of Defence Services of the Tatmadaw.)
- Vietnam - Prime Minister of Vietnam Phạm Minh Chính
- Laos - General Secretary and President of Laos Thongloun Sisoulith
- India – Prime Minister of India Narendra Modi
- Indonesia – Minister of Foreign Affairs Sugiono
- Iran – President of Iran Masoud Pezeshkian
- Kazakhstan – President of Kazakhstan Kassym-Jomart Tokayev
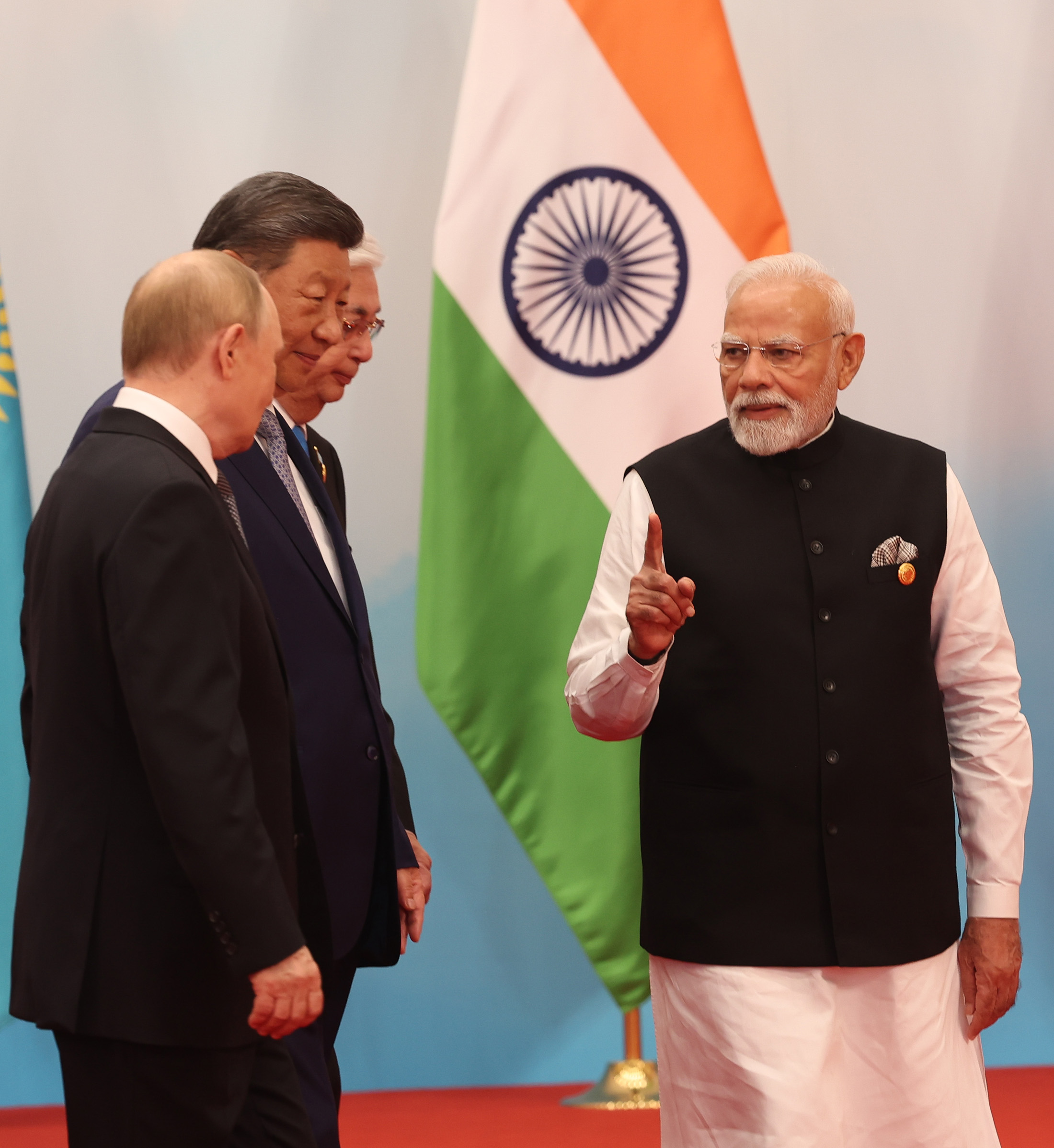
  Russian President Vladimir Putin, Chinese leader Xi Jinping, Kazakh President Kassym-Jomart Tokayev and Indian Prime Minister Narendra Modi (left to right) at the SCO Summit.
- Kyrgyzstan – President of the Kyrgyz Republic Sadyr Japarov
- Mongolia – President of Mongolia Ukhnaagiin Khürelsükh
- Nepal – Prime Minister of Nepal KP Sharma Oli
- Pakistan – Prime Minister of Pakistan Shehbaz Sharif
- Russia – President of Russia Vladimir Putin
- Turkey – President of Turkey Recep Tayyip Erdoğan
- Tajikistan – President of Tajikistan Emomali Rahmon
- Turkmenistan - President of Turkmenistan Serdar Berdimuhamedov
- Uzbekistan – President of Uzbekistan Shavkat Mirziyoyev
- Malaysia - Prime Minister of Malaysia Anwar Ibrahim
- Shanghai Cooperation Organisation - Secretary General Nurlan Yermekbayev
- Regional Anti-Terrorist Structure - Director of Executive Committee Ularbek Sharsheev
- ASEAN - Secretary-General Kao Kim Hourn
- Commonwealth of Independent States - General Secretary Sergey Lebedev
- Collective Security Treaty Organization - Secretary General Imangali Tasmagambetov
- Eurasian Economic Union - Chairman of the Board of EEC Bakhytjan Sagintayev
- Economic Cooperation Organization - Secretary-General Asad Majeed Khan
- Conference on Interaction and Confidence-Building Measures in Asia - Secretary-General Kairat Sarybay
- Asian Infrastructure Investment Bank - President Jin Liqun
- United Nations - Secretary-General of the United Nations António Guterres

Indonesian President Prabowo Subianto who was invited to the summit has decided to cancel his attendance due to the August 2025 Indonesian protests.

== Meeting agenda ==
=== Meetings ===
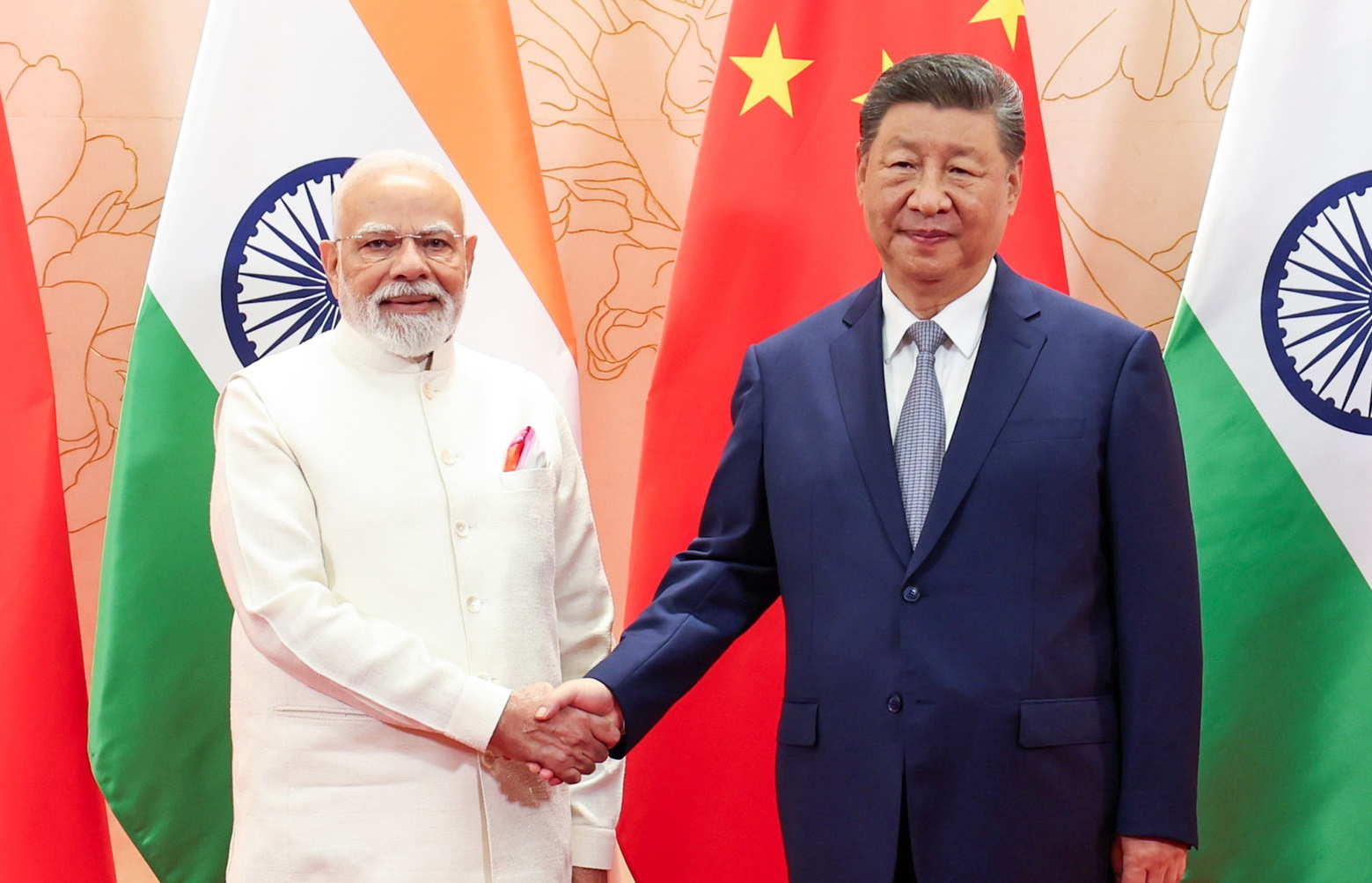
Xi Jinping meeting with Narendra Modi

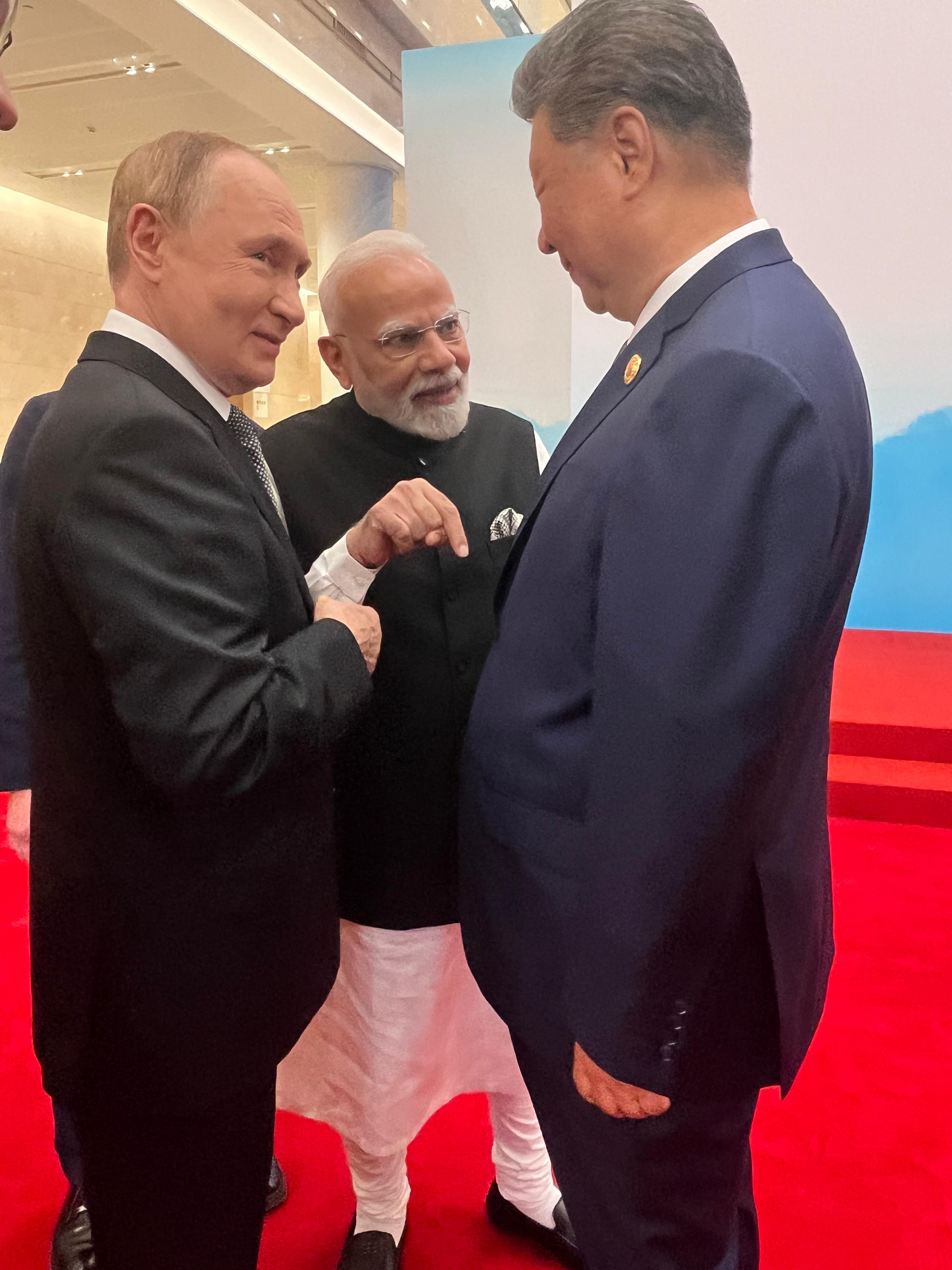
Narendra Modi with Vladimir Putin and Xi Jinping

On 30 August, Chinese leader Xi Jinping met with Kazakh President Tokayev, Myanmar Acting President Min Aung Hlaing, Egyptian Prime Minister Madbouly, Cambodian Prime Minister Hun Manet, Pakistani Prime Minister Shehbaz Sharif, Nepalese Prime Minister Oli, and United Nations Secretary-General Guterres, among others.

On 31 August, Xi Jinping met with Maldivian President Muizzu, Azerbaijani President Aliyev, Belarusian President Lukashenko, Kyrgyz President Japarov, Turkish President Erdoğan, Armenian Prime Minister Pashinyan, Indian Prime Minister Modi, Vietnamese Prime Minister Phạm Minh Chính, among others.

=== Welcome banquet ===
On the evening of 31 August, Chinese leader Xi Jinping and First Lady Peng Liyuan hosted a banquet at the Meijiang Convention and Exhibition Center in Tianjin to welcome international guests attending the 2025 Shanghai Cooperation Organization Summit.

After the banquet, participants enjoyed the cultural performance "Creating a Shared Future". Before the banquet, guests visited exhibitions of Tianjin's intangible cultural heritage, including Yangliuqing New Year Paintings.

== See also ==
- 2025 China Victory Day Parade
