= Sun Dongdong =

Sun Dongdong (Chinese: 孙东东, born 20 December 1959) is the head of Peking University's forensics department and also runs Peking University's judicial expertise centre.

In April 2009, Sun was heavily criticized because of statements he made about petitioners in China and the xinfang petition system. According to The Wall Street Journal, he supports "the forced hospitalizations of mentally ill petitioners" and has said, "When [a petitioner] insists on his particular point of view, that point of view is a symptom of paranoia. ... Hospitalization of (a mentally ill person) is the greatest safeguard." Sun later issued an apology for his comments, saying he expresses regret for his statements.
