= Data Administration =

Data Administration may refer to

- Data administration, an organizational function
- National Data Administration, a Chinese central government agency
