= He Zhiliang =

Chinese politician (born 1970)

- 贺志亮

Deputy Head of the Society Work Department of the Central Committee of the Chinese Communist Party
- In office January 2025 – June 2026

Director of the Jilin Provincial Public Security Department
- In office January 2023 – March 2025
- Preceded by: Liu Jinbo
- Succeeded by: Chen Yuhuang

Party Secretary of Jilin City
- In office November 2020 – January 2023
- Preceded by: Wang Tingkai
- Succeeded by: Hu Bin

Mayor of Jilin City
- In office December 2019 – December 2020
- Preceded by: Liu Fei
- Succeeded by: Wang Lu

Personal details
- Born: October 1970 (age 55–56) Linhe County, Inner Mongolia, China
- Party: Chinese Communist Party (1996-)
- Education: Inner Mongolia Agricultural University

He Zhiliang (Chinese: 贺志亮; born October 1970) is a former Chinese politician, who was served as the deputy head of the Society Work Department of the Central Committee of the Chinese Communist Party from 2025 to 2026, and the director of the Jilin Provincial Public Security Department from 2023 to 2025. He is a delegate to the 20th National Congress of the Chinese Communist Party.

== Career ==
He was born in Linhe County, Inner Mongolia in October 1970. In 1991, he was enrolled to Inner Mongolia Agricultural University and graduated in 1995. After graduating, he was enrolled to Chengguan Township in Linhe, and served as some positions. He was transferred to Bayannur League Planning Commission in 1999. In 2003, He was appointed as the deputy mayor of Linhe, and appointed as the deputy secretary-general of the Bayannur Municipal Government. In 2011, he was appointed as the member of the standing committee and the head of the Publicity Department of the Tongliao Municipal Committee of the CCP. In 2013, he was appointed as the deputy mayor of Tongliao, and the party secretary of Kailu County. In 2015, he was appointed as the secretary-general of the Tongliao Municipal Committee of the CCP.

In 2017, He was appointed as the deputy head of the Organization Department of the Inner Mongolia Autonomous Regional Committee of the Chinese Communist Party. He was appointed as the deputy head of the Publicity Department of the Inner Mongolia Autonomous Regional Party Committee and the director of the Department of the Culture and Tourism of the Inner Mongolia Autonomous Region.

In December 2019, He was transferred to Jilin City, and served as the mayor. He was appointed as the party secretary in November 2020.

In January 2023, He was appointed as the vice governor of Jilin, and appointed as the director of the Jilin Provincial Public Security Department in February.

In January 2025, He was appointed as the deputy head of the Society Work Department of the Central Committee of the Chinese Communist Party.

== Investigation ==
On 27 June 2026, He was suspected of "serious violations of laws and regulations" by the Central Commission for Discipline Inspection (CCDI), the party's internal disciplinary body, and the National Supervisory Commission, the highest anti-corruption agency of China, which became the first sub-provincial official to be dismissed from his post since the Society Work Department established.

Government offices
Preceded by Liu Fei	Mayor of Jilin City; 2019－2020	Succeeded by Wang Lu
Preceded by Liu Jinbo	Director of the Jilin Provincial Public Security Department; 2023－2025	Succeeded by Chen Yuhuang
Party political offices
Preceded by Wang Tingkai	Party Secretary of Jilin City; 2020－2023	Succeeded by Hu Bin
