= Wu Hansheng =

Chinese politician (born 1963)

- 吴汉圣

Head of the Society Work Department
- Incumbent
- Assumed office 8 July 2023
- General Secretary: Xi Jinping
- Preceded by: Office established

Executive Deputy Secretary of the Working Committee of the Central and State Organs of the Central Committee of the Chinese Communist Party
- In office May 2022 – 4 April 2023
- Secretary: Ding Xuexiang
- Preceded by: Liang Yanshun
- Succeeded by: Guo Wenqi

Personal details
- Born: April 1963 (age 63) Linqu County, Shandong, China
- Party: Chinese Communist Party
- Education: Jilin University; Central Party School of the Chinese Communist Party

Chinese name
- Simplified Chinese: 吴汉圣
- Traditional Chinese: 吳漢聖
Transcriptions
Standard Mandarin
- Hanyu Pinyin: Wú Hànshèng

Wu Hansheng (Chinese: 吴汉圣; born April 1963) is a Chinese politician who is currently serving as the head of the Society Work Department of the Central Committee of the Chinese Communist Party (CCP).

He previously served as executive deputy secretary of the Working Committee of the Central and State Organs of the Central Committee of the Chinese Communist Party between 2022 and 2023.

== Early life and education ==
Wu was born in Linqu County, Shandong, in April 1963. In 1981, he entered Jilin University of Technology (now Jilin University), where he majored in internal-combustion engine.

== Political career ==
Wu joined the Chinese Communist Party (CCP) in June 1984.

After graduating from college in 1985, Wu became an official in the Ministry of Machine-Building Industry. In April 1991, he was despatched to the Central and State Organs Working Committee of the CCP Central Committee, and assumed various administrative and political roles there.

In January 2010, Wu was transferred to northeast China's Liaoning province and appointed vice mayor of the capital city Shenyang. In January 2013, he was admitted to member of the Standing Committee of the CCP Shenyang Municipal Committee, the province's top authority, and appointed head of the Organization Department of the CCP Shenyang Municipal Committee. He was appointed party secretary of Yingkou in September 2014 and in May 2016 was admitted to member of the Standing Committee of the CCP Liaoning Provincial Committee, the province's top authority. He also served as secretary-general of the CCP Liaoning Provincial Committee and secretary of the Working Committee of Liaoning Provincial Organs.

In March 2017, Wu was transferred to north China's Shanxi province. He was a member of the Standing Committee of the CCP Shanxi Provincial Committee, the province's top authority. He was head of the Organization Department of the CCP Shanxi Provincial Committee in March 2017, in addition to serving as president of the Provincial Party School.

In December 2018, he became deputy party secretary of the Working Committee of the Central and State Organs of the Central Committee of the Chinese Communist Party, rising to executive deputy secretary in May 2022. He was a representative of the 20th CCP National Congress, and was elected as a member of the 20th CCP Central Committee during the Congress. He was removed from his role as deputy party secretary in April 2023. On 8 July 2023, he was appointed as the head of the newly established Society Work Department of the CCP Central Committee.

Party political offices
Preceded by Wei Xiaopeng	Communist Party Secretary of Yingkou; 2014–2016	Succeeded by Zhao Changfu
Preceded by Tan Zuojun	Secretary-General of the Liaoning Provincial Committee of the Chinese Communist Party; 2016–2017	Succeeded by Liu Huanxin
Preceded by Sheng Maolin	Head of the Organization Department of Shanxi Provincial Committee of the Chinese Communist Party; 2017–2018	Succeeded by Qu Xiaoli
Preceded by Liang Yanshun	Executive Deputy Secretary of the Working Committee of the Central and State Organs of the Central Committee of the Chinese Communist Party; 2022–2023	Succeeded by Guo Wenqi
Government offices
Preceded by Zeng Yichun	Head of the Discipline Inspection and Supervision Team of the Central Commission for Discipline Inspection and the National Supervisory Commission in the Central Organization Department; 2020–2022	Succeeded by Guo Wenqi
