= Tianjin Grand Theatre =

Theater in Tianjin, China

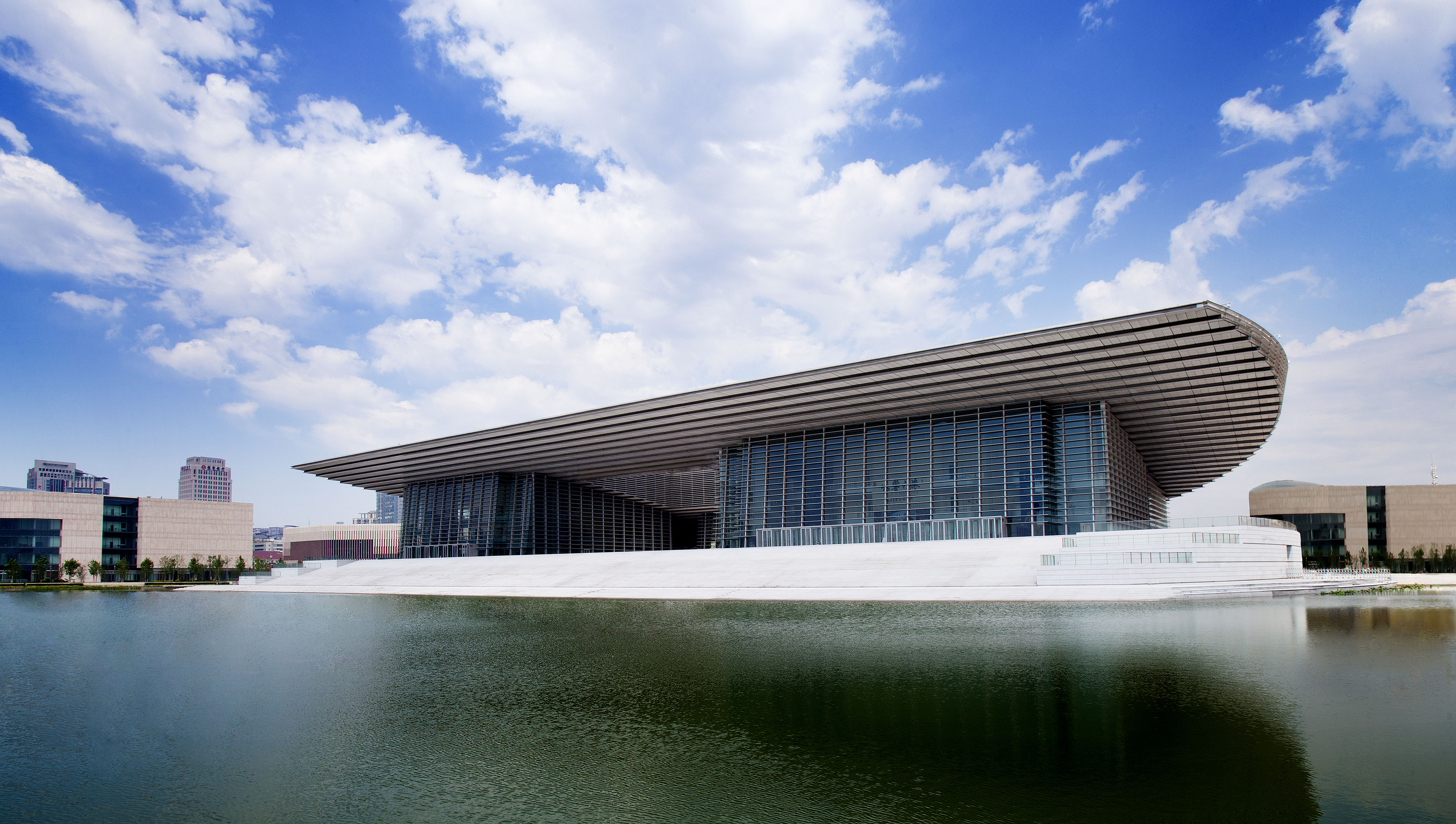
- Alternative names: Tianjin Cultural Center – Grand Theatre

General information
- Architectural style: Modernist Architecture
- Location: Yuexiu Road, Hexi District, Tianjin, China
- Construction started: September 2009
- Completed: April 22, 2012
- Cost: ¥ 1.533 Billion

Height
- Height: 45 Meters

Technical details
- Floor area: 105,000 m²

Design and construction
- Architecture firm: Gerkan, Marg and Partners; East China Architectural Design & Research Institute Co., Ltd.
- Awards and prizes: National Luban Prize for Construction Project

Renovating team
- Architects: Meinhard von Gerkan, Stephan Schütz, Cui Zhongfang, Fang Chao

Tianjin Grand Theatre, also known as the Tianjin Cultural Centre Grand Theatre, is located on the east side of the Tianjin Cultural Centre, Hexi District, Tianjin City, People's Republic of China. It is the largest venue in the Tianjin Cultural Centre. Designed by German GMP architectural company, the theatre adopts the style of modernist architecture. The construction of the Tianjin Grand Theatre started in 2009 and was completed and put into use on April 22, 2012. Its total construction space amounts to 105,000 m^{2}. The theatre can seat 3,600 people, and costs 1.533 billion RMB in total.

Operas, dances, musicals, symphonies, Chinese modern dramas, and Chinese operas are all performed in the Tianjin Grand Theatre. The number of various performances staged in a year reaches 300.

== History ==
=== Tianjin Grand Auditorium ===
The Tianjin Grand Theatre grew out of the Tianjin Grand Auditorium located in 24 You Yi Road, He Xi District, Tianjin. The Tianjin Grand Auditorium was the convention center of the Tianjin Hotel architectural complex. Its construction started in 1959, and completed in 1961. Wang Yayuan from the Tianjin Industrial Architectural Design Institute, Ministry of Architecture and Construction, led the designing work for the auditorium. As the largest hotel complex and auditorium at that time, its construction space amounted to 32,700 m^{2}. Its architectural style emulated the Great Hall of the People. Managed by Tianjin municipal government, the major function of the auditorium was to receive guests, hold all sorts of governmental meetings and other performances. Since its completion, all previous meetings of Chinese Communist Party Tianjin Municipal Committee and Municipal People's Congress, Political Consultative conferences, and government hosted large-scale activities were held here. In 1976, the front building of Tianjin hotel was reinforced for better earthquake resistance.

In 2000, the re-construction of the auditorium started. Tianjin Construction Engineering Group's holding subsidiary, the Sanjian company took charge of the construction work. In August, the medium-sized theatre was first re-constructed. On the 15th of December, its re-construction was completed and then started operating. On August 18, 2001, the grand theatre and vestibule of the small theatre began their re-construction. On March 30, 2002, the project was completed. The re-constructed auditorium was then named as 'Tianjin Grand Theatre' on the basis of the change of its function. Zhang Lichang, the then Chinese Communist Party Committee Secretary of Tianjin wrote the tablet to commemorate. From 2002 to 2012, the Tianjin Grand Theatre and Tianjin Grand Auditorium were actually 'one organization with two names'. Different names would be used when different activities were held. For government conferences, meetings or official activities, 'Tianjin Grand Auditorium' would be adopted as the name. For commercial activities and performances, the name 'Tianjin Grand Theatre' would be used.

=== Tianjin Cultural Centre ===
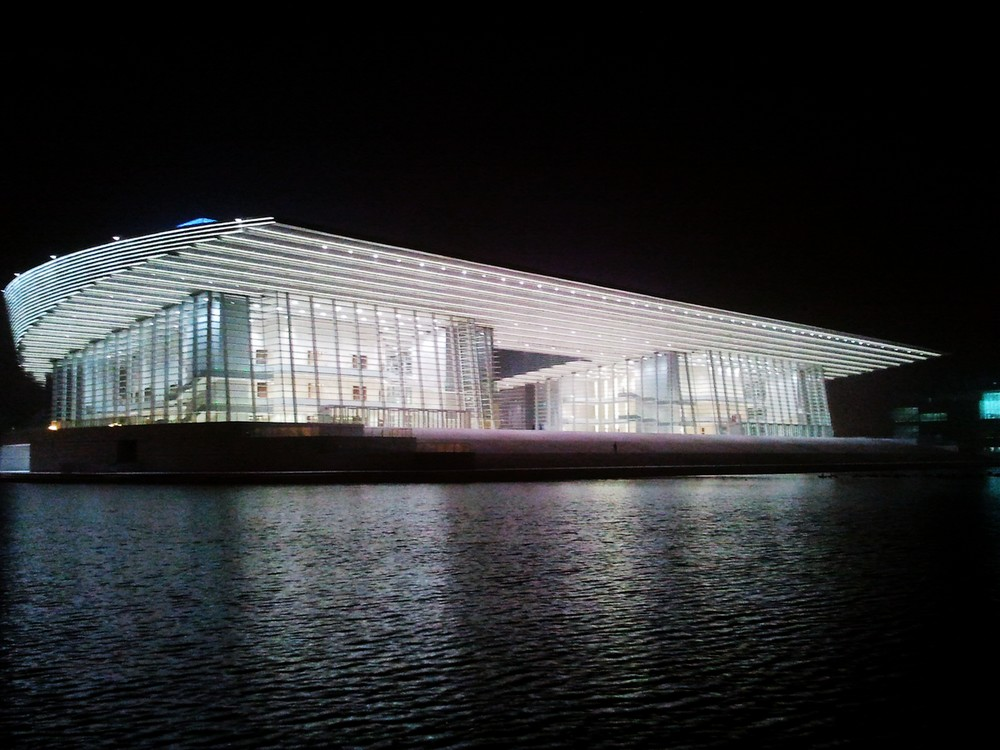
Tianjin Grand Theatre and the Nightscape of Musical Fountain

In March 2009, the Tianjin Municipal Government initiated a public bidding for the cultural center's architectural design plan. For the grand theatre, four plans submitted by well-known architects such as Rem Koolhaas and Meinhard von Gerkan were selected into the second round. The design plan for the theatre raised an extensive discussion and interest in Tianjin.

On May 25, 2009, Huang Xingguo, the then mayor of Tianjin, presided at the meeting of the Standing Committee of Tianjin Municipality and heard the report of different plans for the design of the cultural centre. The final design plan for the Tianjin Grand Theatre (including its venues) was then decided. The plan from Gerkan, Marg and Partners and East China Architectural Design & Research Institute Co., Ltd. won the bidding at last. From June 3 to 12, 2009, public opinions about the Design Plan for the Cultural Centre of Tianjin Municipality were solicited through the coverage of news medias and display in Tianjin Planning Exhibition Hall. In September, the construction of the new theatre began. Zhang Gaoli, the Communist Party Secretary of Tianjin at that time visited the construction site personally for many times and facilitated the scheduled completion.

On May 4, 2011, Culture, Broadcasting, Film & TV administration of Tianjin Municipality, the responsible authority of the Tianjin Grand Theatre signed the contract of entrusted operation and management with Beijing Qu Dong Culture & Media Co., Ltd. The latter one took the responsibility of running and managing the theatre. Thereafter, the Tianjin Grand Theatre separated from the Auditorium (which was operated and managed by Tianjin Hotel Group). The government-directed model turned into market-based one.

Earlier in 2012, the Tianjin Grand Theatre was completed and put into use before the meeting of the 10th Tianjin Municipality's People's Congress. On April 22, 2012, the pilot run started, and the first performance was successfully staged. On April 27, symphony was first staged in the concert hall. From April 29 to May 7, the inaugural performances and ceremony were held in the grand theatre.

From May 1 to June 30, 2013, the first International Chamber Music Festival in Tianjin was hosted in the Tianjin Grand Theatre. 19 concerts including performances from the violinist Anne-Sophie Mutter, Gidon Kremer, Chamber Music team of the Philadelphia Orchestra, the Emerson String Quartet, Chinese pianist Chen Sa, Erhu player Yu Hongmei, Guqin player Wu Na and more than one hundred artists were staged in the theatre. In addition, these artists went to the local community to help people better appreciate the beauty of chamber music.

Since the opening of the theatre, the Philadelphia Orchestra, the Mariinsky Orchestra, Japan's NHK Symphony Orchestra and other top-level art ensembles all performed here.

In October 2017, Tianjin Drive Culture Media Co. failed to win the bid to operate the Tianjin Grand Theater, and Beijing Poly Theater Company took over the Tianjin Grand Theater in December.

== Architectural Features ==
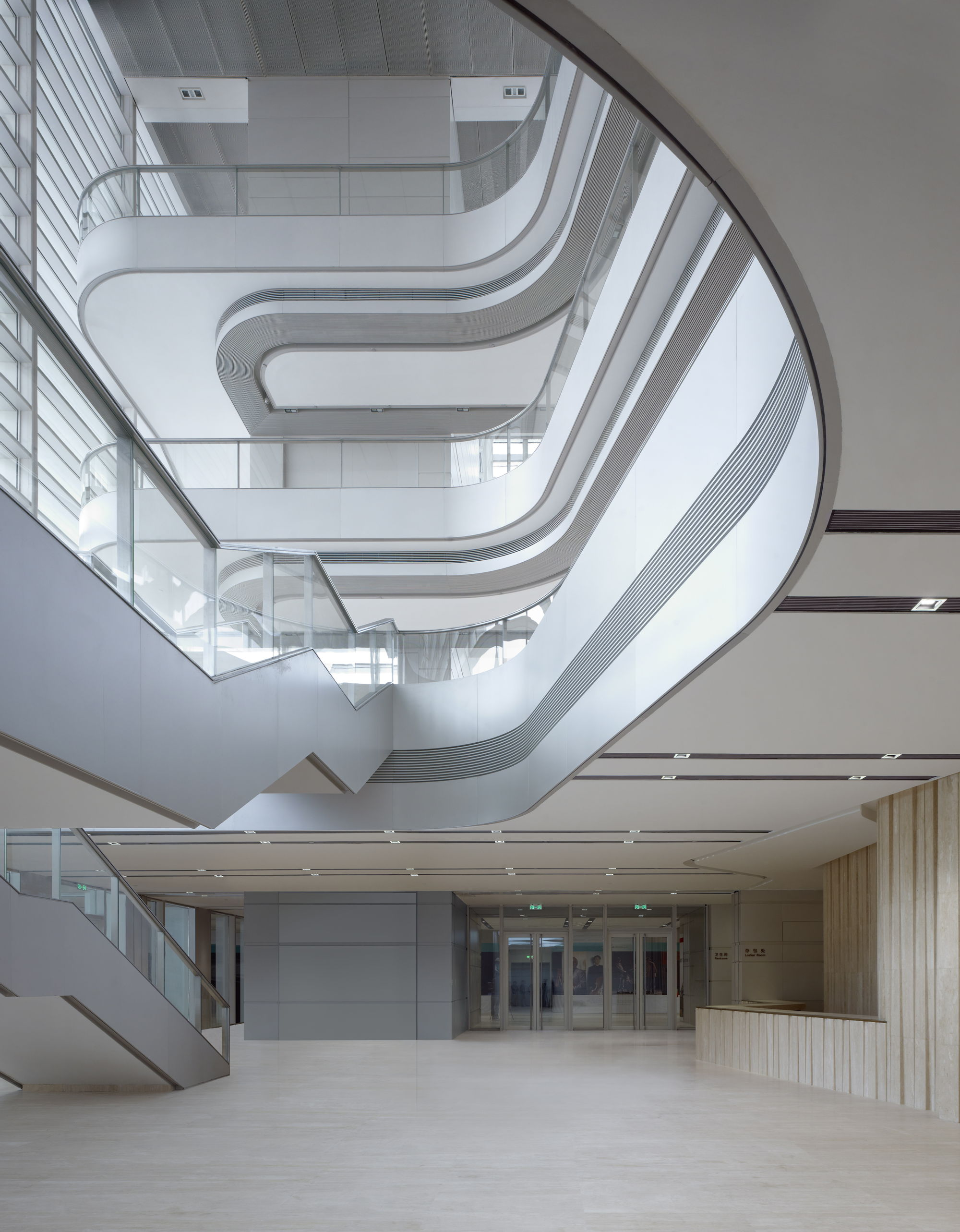
The Indoor Setting of the Tianjin Grand Theatre

The total construction space of the Tianjin Grand Theatre is 105,000 m^{2}. It costs ¥ 1.533 billion and can seat 3,600 people. There are five floors above the ground, three floors under the ground. The theatre is equipped with 3,600 seats. The Tianjin Grand Theatre is designed by Gerkan, Marg and Partners, which has frequently participated in the designing of other landmark architectures in Tianjin. At the same time, it also won the bidding of Tianjin West Railway Station and other landmark buildings. Tianjin Sanjian company took charge of the construction and was awarded the National Luban Prize for Construction project in 2013. The production team of Transformers: Age of Extinction also shot the film in the Tianjin Grand Theatre.

=== The Philosophical Feature of the Design ===
Architect Meinhard von Gerkan said that the Chinese philosophical concepts of 'Heaven' and 'Earth' were adopted in the design. The Tianjin Grand Theatre symbolizes the 'Heaven'. The theatre is raised above a man-made lake. Its round shape refers to the concept of heaven. The Tianjin Natural History Museum symbolizes the 'Earth', which is realized through its pitched roof. As the theme building of the new Tianjin Cultural center, the grand theatre's dish-shaped roof echoes with the museum's, symbolizing the concepts of 'Heaven' and 'Earth' together. A delightful contrast is thus formed in the new cultural center.

=== Constructional Details ===
The grand theatre consists of four parts - the opera house, the concert hall, the experimental theatre and the multi-functional hall. Among them, the opera house is the largest. Located in the south side of the theatre, it can seat 1,600 people. Four entrances (A, B, C, D) of the opera house are set up from the ground to the third floor. Access for disabled visitors is also available. The concert hall with an island-shape stage is the second largest and can seat 1,200 people. Its design is inspired from the terrace in vineyards. It can hold a full-sized orchestra and a large choir. To the east of the opera house and concert hall are the experimental theatre and the multi-functional hall. Both are equipped with 400 adjustable seats. Besides, there is a 1,200-meter street full of stores selling works of art linking the four different parts inside the grand theatre.

== Theatre Operation and Alliance ==
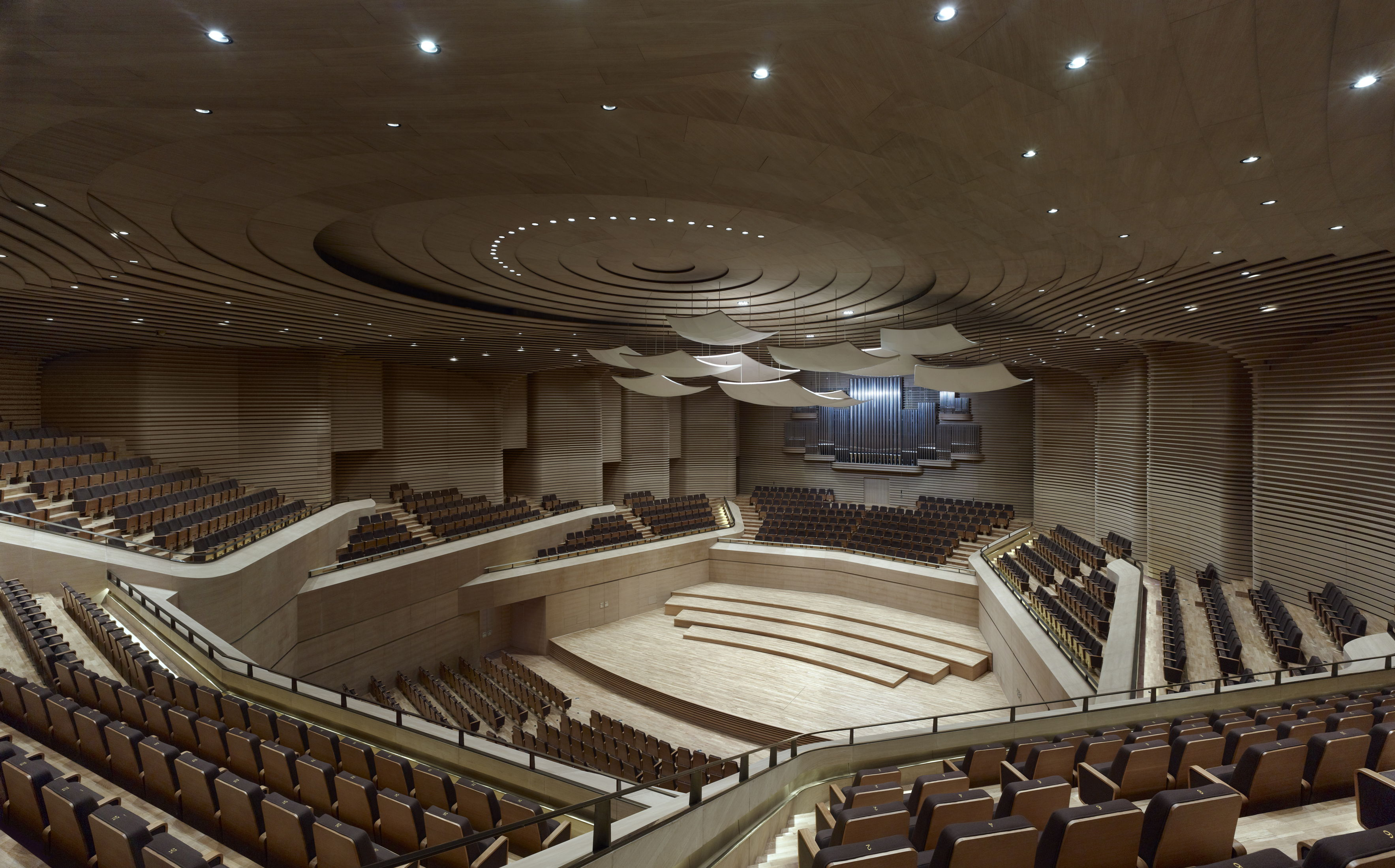
The Tianjin Grand Theatre's Concert Hall

=== Operation Model ===
The Tianjin Grand Theatre and the Tianjin Grand Auditorium were once 'one organization with two names'. Thus, as the largest convention center of Tianjin, the grand theatre was completely operated by the municipal government in the past. When the new grand theatre was established in the cultural center, the 17th National Congress of the Chinese Communist Party was also held in Beijing. The reformation of cultural system was proposed at the same time.

In 2012, the Tianjin Grand Theatre shifted from the government led operational model to the entrusted one. The entire market-based operating model - BOT (Build - Operate - Transfer) was adopted. Beijing Propel Culture & Media Co., Ltd acquired the power for operation of the theatre and earned the support from the municipal government. Although the company did not get financial aids from the government, it enjoyed the policy of tax reduction. The annual operation cost approximates ¥ 100 million. Besides, the company got the permission to use the venue (5,000 m^{2}) under the theatre's 6-meter-high step to develop creative industry as a subsidy for the operational cost. According to the contract signed by the municipal government and the company, Propel Culture & Media Co., Ltd is supposed to accomplish 300 performances every year. Among them, 15% should be 'A-level' performances.

=== Performances and Art Education ===
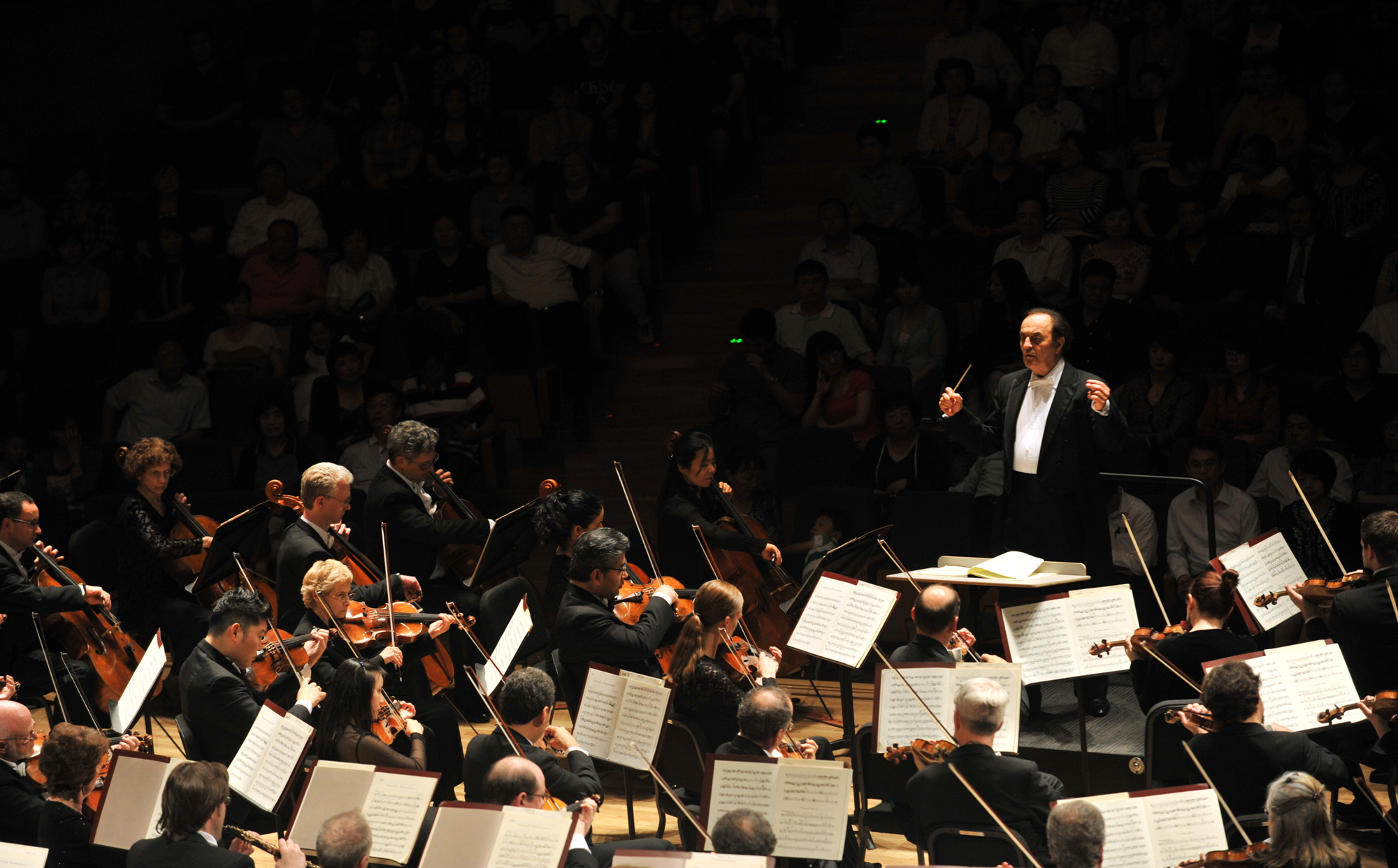
Concert of Charles Dutoit and Philadelphia Orchestra in Tianjin

Every year, more than 300 performances are staged in the grand theatre, including operas, dances, musicals, symphonies, Chinese modern dramas, Chinese operas. Since the establishment of the theatre in April 2012, about 10 high-toned operas have been performed annually. For example, Puccini's Tosca, Tchaikovsky's Eugene Onegin carried out by Stanislavski Russian Theatre, Béla Bartók's Bluebeard's Castle, Giuseppe Verdi's Rigoletto, Il trovatore, Aida performed by Hungarian State Opera House, Mozart's The Marriage of Figaro by Deutsche Oper am Rhein, and La traviata of Giuseppe Verdi. In June 2012, Concert of Charles Dutoit and Philadelphia Orchestra was staged in the theatre. 296 performances have been staged and 270,000 visitors have been served till the first anniversary of the theatre's inauguration ceremony.

Besides these performances, the grand theatre also plays a vital part in art education. Activities such as academic forums, international chamber music festivals, and 'art education and community outreach' are frequently held in Tianjin.

=== Facilities ===
The grand theatre's audio-visual equipment is excellent. According to the comments of experts, the opera house is unanimously judged as the best in China, by no means inferior to the National Centre for the Performing Arts. In April 2012, the then artistic director and chief conductor of Zurich Chamber Orchestra Tang Muhai commented 'the facilities of the Tianjin Grand Theatre are among the bests in the world…the sound effects are fabulous.'

In April 2013, a cold wave swept across Tianjin and temperature dropped immediately. The municipal government's central heating system had already stopped its supply on March 15. Without the heating supply, the theatre's temperature could not reach 23 °C (the minimum requirement for normal performances), which directly caused the suspension of Royal New Zealand Ballet's performance. After this incident, the theatre submitted its proposal to the municipal government for the installation of its independent heating system. But this effort proved to be futile as the competent department asserted that the central heating system could satisfy the theatre's needs without any problem.

=== Theatre Alliance ===
The Tianjin theatre alliance was founded in September 2012 after the registration and approval by Tianjin Civil Affairs Bureau. It is a non-profit trade union consisting of main theatres (including the Tianjin Grand Theatre), artistic groups and performance marketing agencies in Tianjin. Beijing Qu Dong Culture & Media Co., Ltd acts as the deputy director of the union.

== Periphery of the Theatre ==
=== Transportation Facilities ===
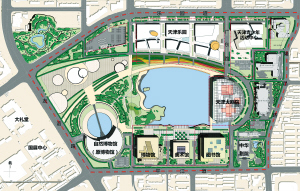
Planning and design of Tianjin Cultural Center

The Tianjin Grand Theatre adjoins You Yi Road, Le Yuan Avenue and many other high streets of the city. It is also next to the hub of communications of the cultural center. Tianjin subway line 5 and line 6 join here. Line 10 and line Z1 also have stops near the theatre.

Besides, the public transit system near the theatre is quite advanced. Line 912, 641, 675, 632, 868, 686, 668, 859, 857, 866, 4, 619, 47, 48, 800, 838, 826 and nearly 20 buses can send visitors straight to the cultural center. Express buses also pass through this area.

=== Peripheral Scenery ===
The Tianjin Cultural Centre is also the center of the administrative area of Tianjin Municipality and part of the Xiao Bai Lou financial district. Adjoining the CPC Tianjin Municipal Committee and the people's government of Tianjin Municipality, the Tianjin Grand Theatre is the main building in the cultural center. There are Tianjin Library, Tianjin Art Gallery, Tianjin Museum, Tianjin Natural and History Museum, Tianjin Science and Technology Museum and other venues in its vicinity. Besides, there are other landmarks and scenic resorts around the theatre, such as the Meijiang Convention and Exhibition Center and the Five Great Avenues tourist area.

There is a musical fountain opposite to the theatre. The spouts and water jets are accompanied with the classical music such as Butterfly Lovers' Violin Concerto and Con te partirò. It creates a theatrical spectacle with light, music and water at night.

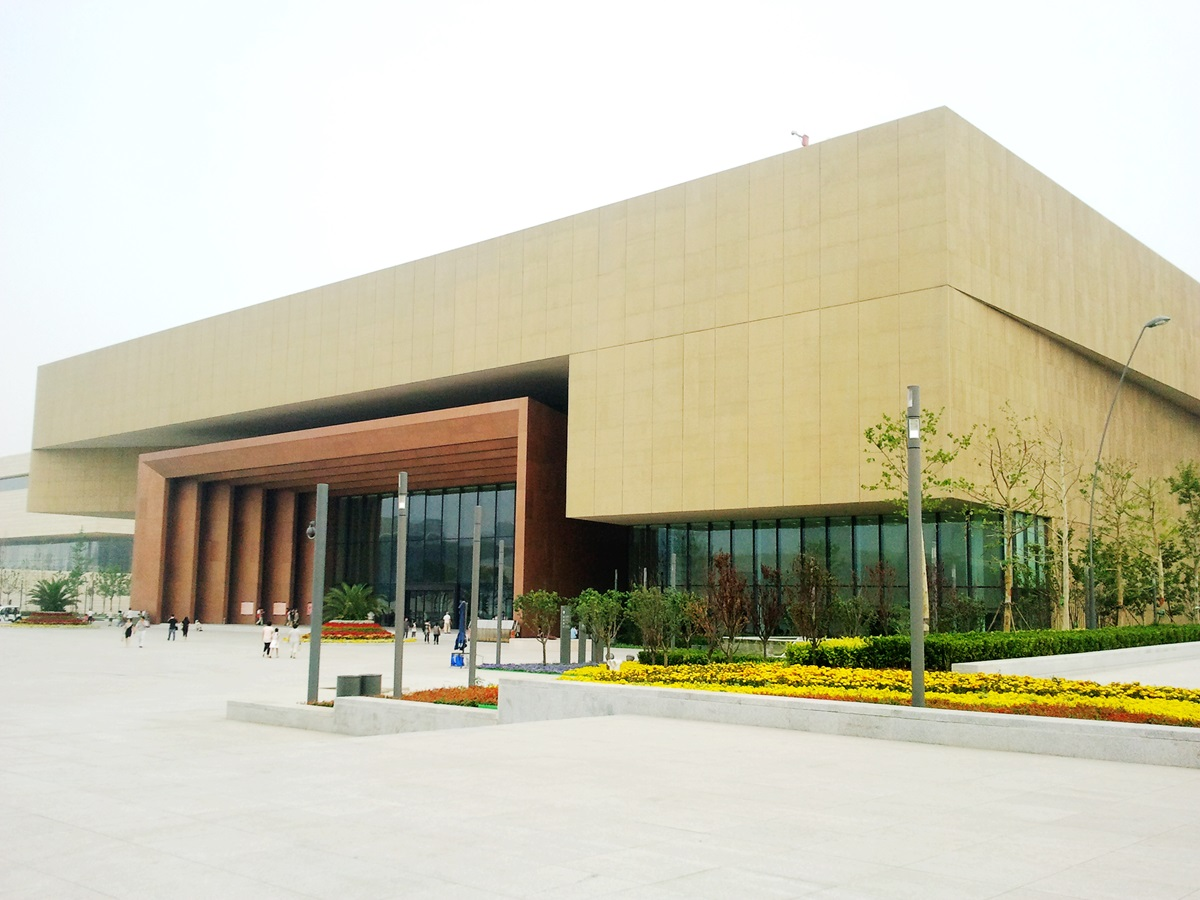
Tianjin Museum

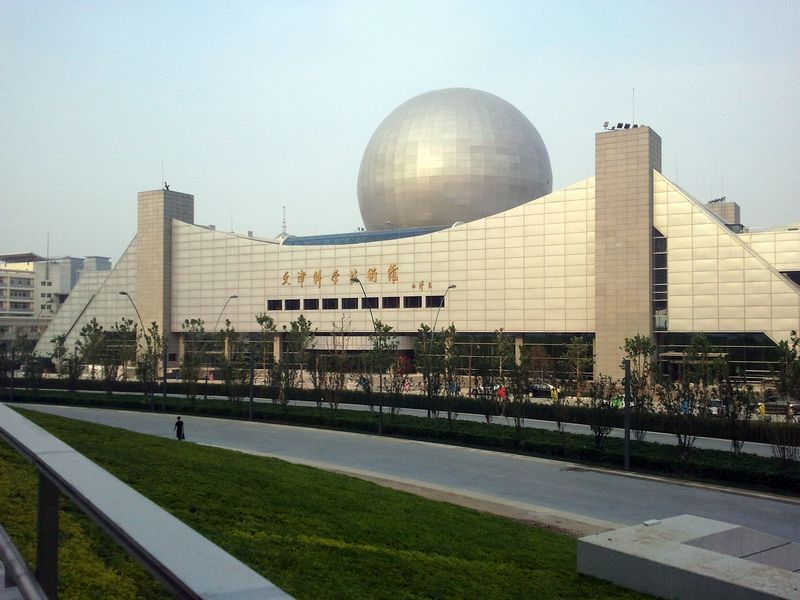
Tianjin Science and Technology Museum

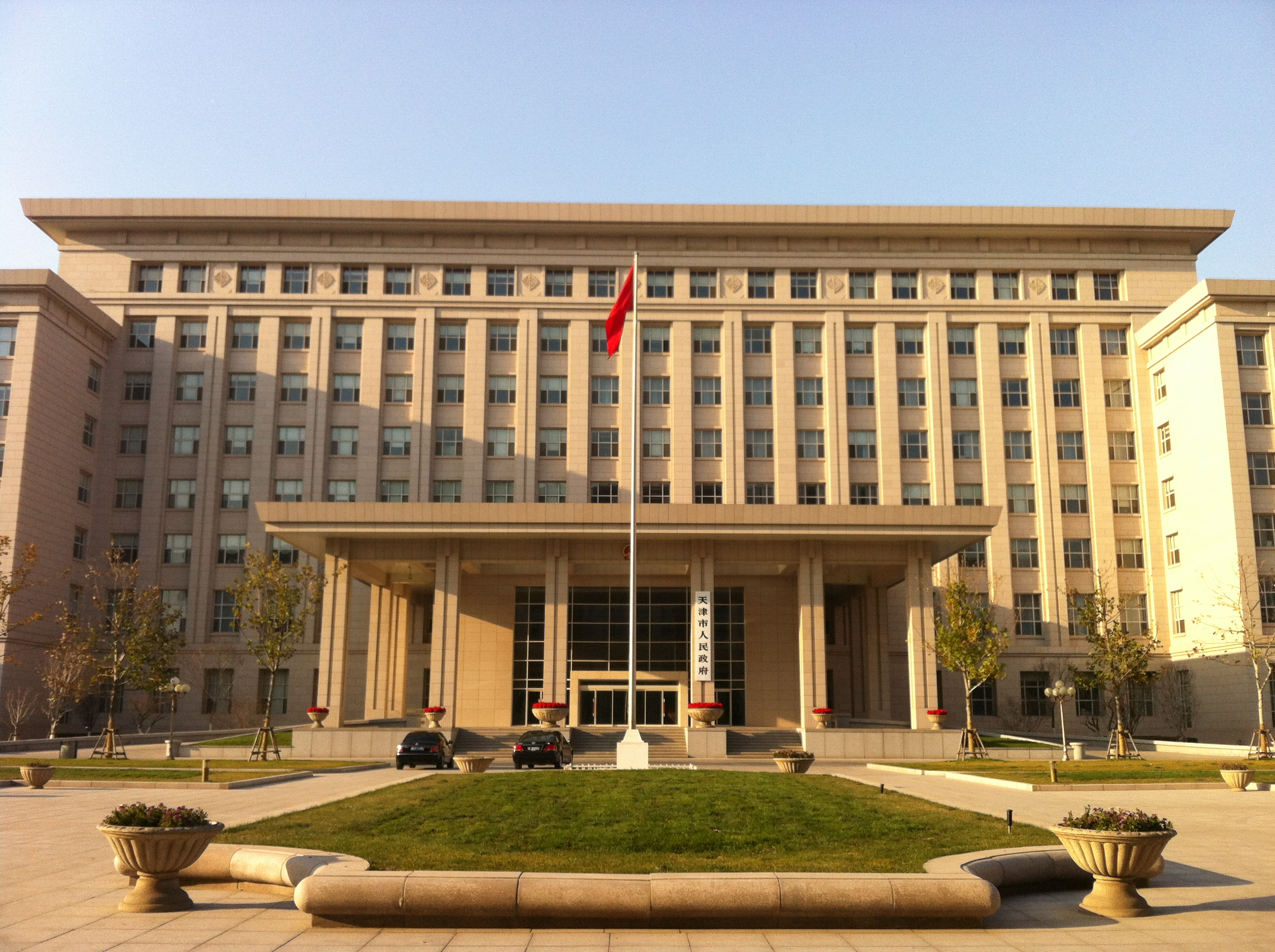
People’s Government of Tianjin Municipality

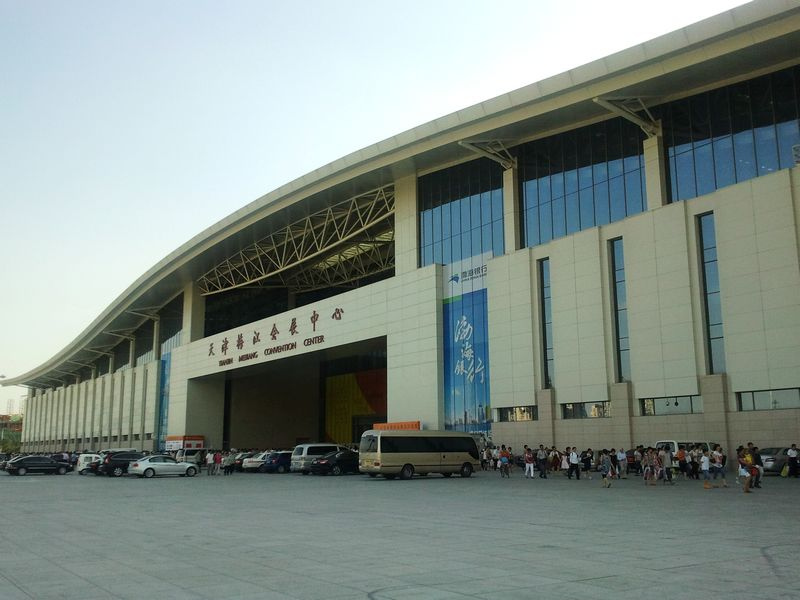
Meijiang Convention and Exhibition Center

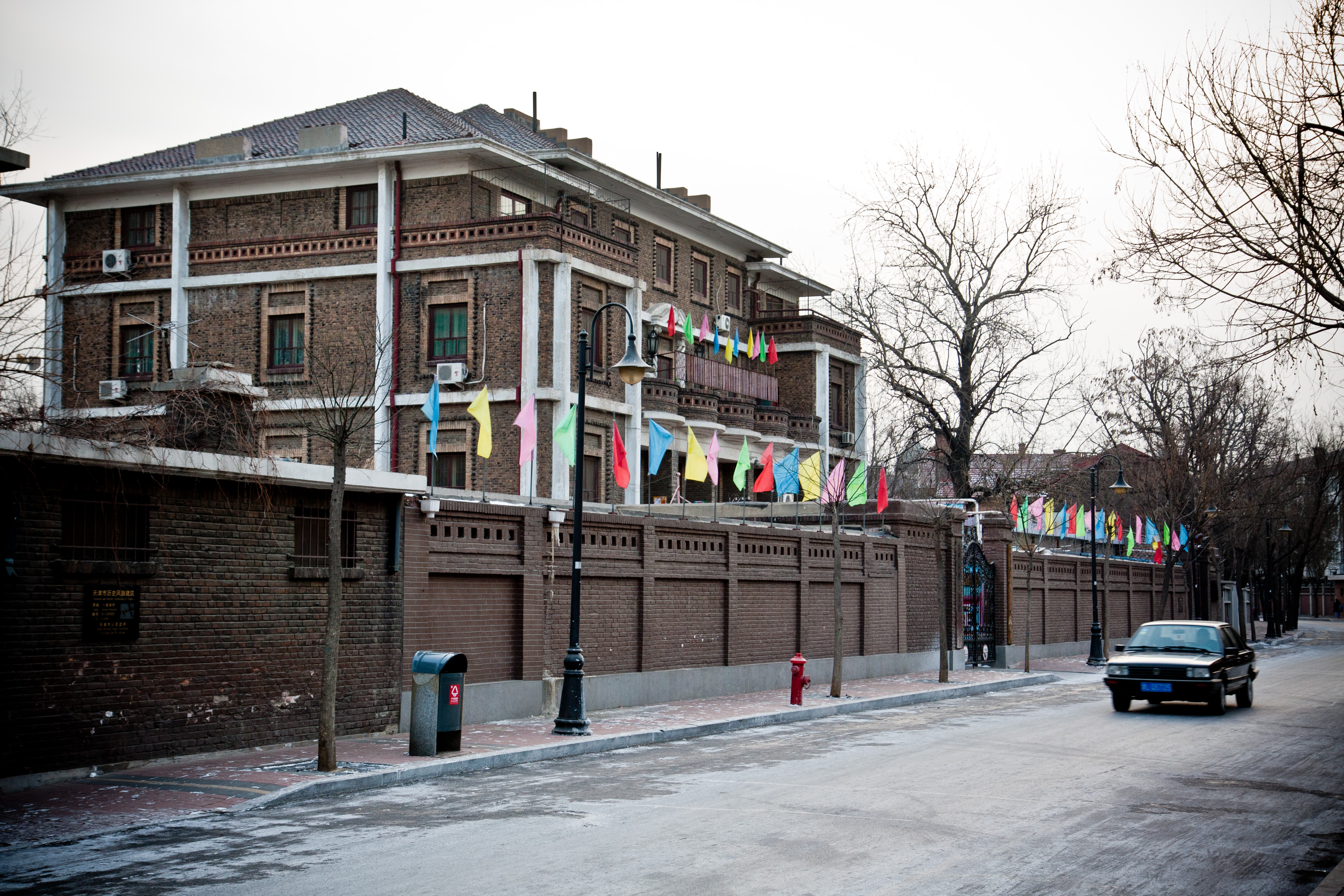
Five Great Avenues Tourist Area

== See also ==
- National Centre for the Performing Arts (China), Guangzhou Opera House, Shanghai Opera House
