= Zhao Changfu =

Chinese politician

- 赵长富

Chairman of the Standing Committee of Yingkou Municipal People's Congress
- In office January 2017 – January 2021
- Preceded by: Wu Hansheng
- Succeeded by: Li Qiang

Communist Party Secretary of Yingkou
- In office August 2016 – January 2021
- Preceded by: Wu Hansheng
- Succeeded by: Li Qiang

Mayor of Yingkou
- In office October 2015 – January 2016
- Preceded by: Ge Lefu
- Succeeded by: Yu Gongbin

Personal details
- Born: January 1961 (age 65) China
- Party: Chinese Communist Party (1982–2023; expelled)

Chinese name
- Simplified Chinese: 赵长富
- Traditional Chinese: 趙長富
Transcriptions
Standard Mandarin
- Hanyu Pinyin: Zhào Chángfù

Zhao Changfu (Chinese: 赵长富; born January 1961) is a former Chinese politician. As of November 2022 he was under investigation by China's top anti-graft watchdog. He was investigated by China's top anti-graft agency in November 2022.

== Biography ==
Zhao was born in January 1961. He joined the Chinese Communist Party (CCP) in July 1982, and entered the workforce in August 1983.

He successively served as deputy secretary of the Dandong Municipal Committee of the Communist Youth League of China, deputy party secretary of the Fengcheng and mayor of Fengcheng Municipal People's Government, party secretary of Fengcheng and chairman of the Standing Committee of Fengcheng Municipal People's Congress, and vice mayor of Dandong Municipal People's Government.

He was deputy director of Liaoning Provincial Environmental Protection Department in March 2009, in addition to serving as director of the Office of the Management Committee of Dahuofang Water Source Protection Area since December 2013.

He served as mayor of Yingkou from October 2015 to January 2016, and party secretary, the top political position in the city, from August 2016 to January 2021. He also served as chairman of the Standing Committee of Yingkou Municipal People's Congress between January 2017 and January 2021.

He retired in January 2021.

=== Downfall ===
On 1 November 2022, Zhao handed himself in to the Central Commission for Discipline Inspection (CCDI), the party's internal disciplinary body, and the National Supervisory Commission, the highest anti-corruption agency of China. His successor Wang Baisheng, also chairman of Yingkou Municipal People's Congress, turned himself in to the anti-corruption agency of China, in the same month.

On 10 May 2023, he was expelled from the CCP and his retirement benefits were cancelled. On June 13, he was indicted on suspicion of accepting bribes. In September, he stood trial at the Intermediate People's Court of Chaoyang on charges of taking bribes.

Government offices
Preceded by Ge Lefu	Mayor of Yingkou; 2015–2016	Succeeded by Yu Gongbin
Party political offices
Preceded by Wu Hansheng	Communist Party Secretary of Yingkou; 2016–2021	Succeeded by Li Qiang
Assembly seats
Preceded by Wu Hansheng	Chairman of the Standing Committee of Yingkou Municipal People's Congress; 2017–2021	Succeeded by Li Qiang
