= National Public Complaints and Proposals Administration =

China's agency for public complaints

- 国家信访局
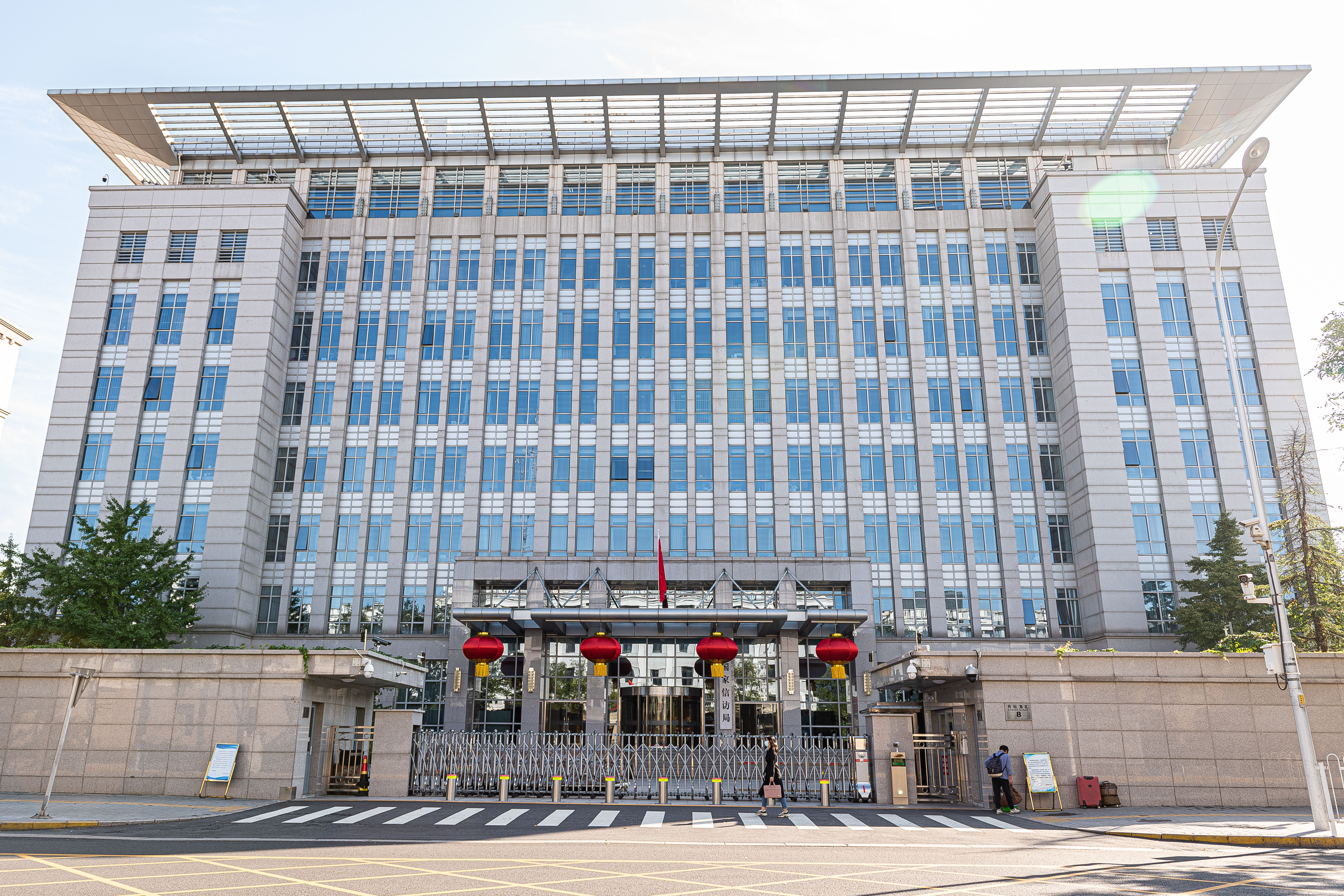
- Headquarters of the Bureau

Agency overview
- Formed: 13 February 2000
- Headquarters: Xicheng, Beijing, China
- Agency executive: Li Wenzhang, Director
- Parent agency: State Council
- Website: www.gjxfj.gov.cn

The National Public Complaints and Proposals Administration (Chinese: 国家信访局) is a deputy-cabinet level agency directly under the State Council of China. It is the national ombudsman office of the People's Republic of China.

The office has its roots in the Bureau of Letters and Calls, founded in 1977 under the General Office of the Chinese Communist Party (CCP). A State Council equivalent was established in 1980, and both offices were merged in 1986. Further reforms led to the establishment of the National Bureau of Letters and Calls in 2000, which assumed its current name in 2016.

The office is responsible for hearing public complaints and proposals against various levels of government agencies nationwide. It is under the leadership of the Society Work Department of the Chinese Communist Party Central Committee since March 2023. The current director of NPCPA is Li Wenzhang, one of the Deputy Secretary-General of the State Council.

== History ==
In 1977, the Bureau of Letters and Calls (中央办公厅信访局) was founded under the CCP General Office in order to overhaul the petitioning system of China. This was followed by the establishment of the Bureau of Letters and Calls of the General Office of the State Council (国务院办公厅信访局) in 1980. In 1986, both offices were merged, and further reforms led to the creation of the National Bureau of Letters and Calls in 2000, which was renamed to the National Public Complaints and Proposals Administration in English in 2016.

In 2023, the Administration was placed directly under the State Council as part of the plan on reforming Party and state institutions, previously being subordinate to its General Office. It was also placed under the "unified leadership" of the newly established Society Work Department of the CCP.

== Functions ==
The National Public Complaints and Proposals Administration is the main petitioning office of China, responsible for hearing public complaints and proposals against various levels of government agencies nationwide. In addition to the national level, the agency includes provincial, city and county-level offices.

== Leadership ==
=== Directors ===
Name	Chinese name	Took office	Left office
Zhou Zhanshun	周占顺	July 2000	February 2004
Wang Xuejun	王学军	February 2004	March 2013
Shu Xiaoqin	舒晓琴	April 2013	April 2020
Li Wenzhang	李文章	9 April 2020	Incumbent

== See also ==
- Petitioning (China)
