= Central Leading Group for Social Governance =

Chinese Communist Party body

- 中央社会治理工作领导小组; Zhōngyāng Shèhuì Zhìlǐ Gōngzuò Lǐngdǎo Xiǎozǔ
- Emblem of the Chinese Communist Party

Agency overview
- Formed: 2025; 1 year ago
- Type: Leading small group
- Jurisdiction: Chinese Communist Party
- Headquarters: Beijing
- Agency executive: Cai Qi, Leader
- Parent agency: Central Committee of the Chinese Communist Party

Central Leading Group for Social Governance
- Simplified Chinese: 中央社会治理工作领导小组
Transcriptions
Standard Mandarin
- Hanyu Pinyin: Zhōngyāng Shèhuì Zhìlǐ Gōngzuò Lǐngdǎo Xiǎozǔ

The Central Leading Group for Social Governance is a coordination body set up under the Central Committee of the Chinese Communist Party for the purpose of social governance.

== History ==
The leading group was established in 2025 without a formal announcement. It ls led by Cai Qi, a member of the Politburo Standing Committee of the Chinese Communist Party.

== Role ==
The Central Leading Group for Social Governance focuses on internal security and grass-roots governance. It is located within the CCP Central Committee's Society Work Department, and directs work to local authorities. According to a source cited by the South China Morning Post, regional social governance leading groups are led by the deputy secretary of the regional CCP committee.
