= Petitioning (China) =

Chinese system for citizen complaints

Petitioning (Chinese: 信访; pinyin: xìnfǎng, literally "letters and visits") (Note: also known as letters and calls or correspondence and reception) is the administrative system for hearing complaints and grievances from individuals in the People's Republic of China. It is a common tool for dispute resolution in the country.

When the petitioner is unsatisfied about the result of Petitioning at lower levels, they have the right to "raise" the case upwards. This approach is known as shangfang, i.e. Up-Petitioning (simplified Chinese: 上访; traditional Chinese: 上訪; pinyin: shàngfǎng, literally "upward visits").

== Origins ==
In ancient imperial times, petitioners were called "people with grievances" (Chinese: 冤民; pinyin: yuānmín). Petitioners who needed justice would come to the yamen of the county magistrate or high official and beat a drum to voice their grievances. As such, every official court was supposed to be equipped with a drum for this sole purpose. Sometimes petitioners would throw their bodies in front of a sedan chair of the high official. When no one else at the local level was able to help, petitioners would travel to the then empire's capital to seek higher official's help.

In the People's Republic of China, petitioners attempt to search for justice through the legal system or local petitioning bureaus. However, those who feel that justice has eluded them often still travel to Beijing as a last resort to appeal to the rulers in the age-old manner.

== System ==
Petitions can take many forms, including phone calls, faxes, visits or even e-mails to any government office with regard to any of the issues. Under the system, the National Public Complaints and Proposals Administration and local bureaus of letters and calls ("petitioning bureaus") are commissioned to receive letters, calls, and visits from individuals or groups on suggestions, complaints, and grievances. The officers then channel the issues to respective departments and monitor the progress of settlement, which they feedback to the filing parties.

Petitioning bureaus are a communication channel between the government and the citizenry, and have been relied on since the establishment of the PRC in 1949. Mao Zedong was significant in establishing a centralized petitioning system in 1951, which he viewed as a means of curbing "bureaucratism." Petitioners may begin their attempts for redress at the local level with letters and calls to offices, which are located in courthouses or in township-level government offices. If unsatisfied, they can move up (shangfang) the hierarchy to provincial level offices and, at the highest level, the National Public Complaints and Proposals Administration in Beijing.

The number of up-petitioners in Beijing alone has allegedly reached more than 100,000 people, not counting those that remain at provincial capitals. The number of people using the petitioning system has increased since 1993, to the extent that the system has been strained for years. Official statistics indicate that petition offices annually handled around 10 million inquiries and complaints from petitioners from 2003 to 2007.

In 2023, the Central Committee of the Chinese Communist Party created the Society Work Department to handle public petitions and grievances, among other functions.

== Issues ==
=== Interception ===
Provincial capitals have been accused of hiring people in Beijing to abduct up-petitioners who have travelled from their areas and force them to go back home; this is known as "intercepting." The apparent aim of interceptors is to prevent citizens from appealing in Beijing, because local officials face reprisals if citizens from their areas seek redress in the capital.

=== Imprisonment and abuse ===
Human rights organizations have accused Chinese authorities of arbitrarily imprisoning large numbers of up-petitioners in black jails or other illicit detention facilities. In 2009, Human Rights Watch produced a report alleging that large numbers of up-petitioners, including children, are detained in black jails, and documented several allegations of torture and mistreatment in the facilities.

== See also ==
- Memorial to the throne, the equivalent petition under imperial China
- Clameur de haro; ombudsman
- Weiquan movement
