= Tianjin Meijiang Convention and Exhibition Center =

Convention center in Xiqing, Tianjin, China

Tianjin Meijiang Convention and Exhibition Center 天津梅江会展中心
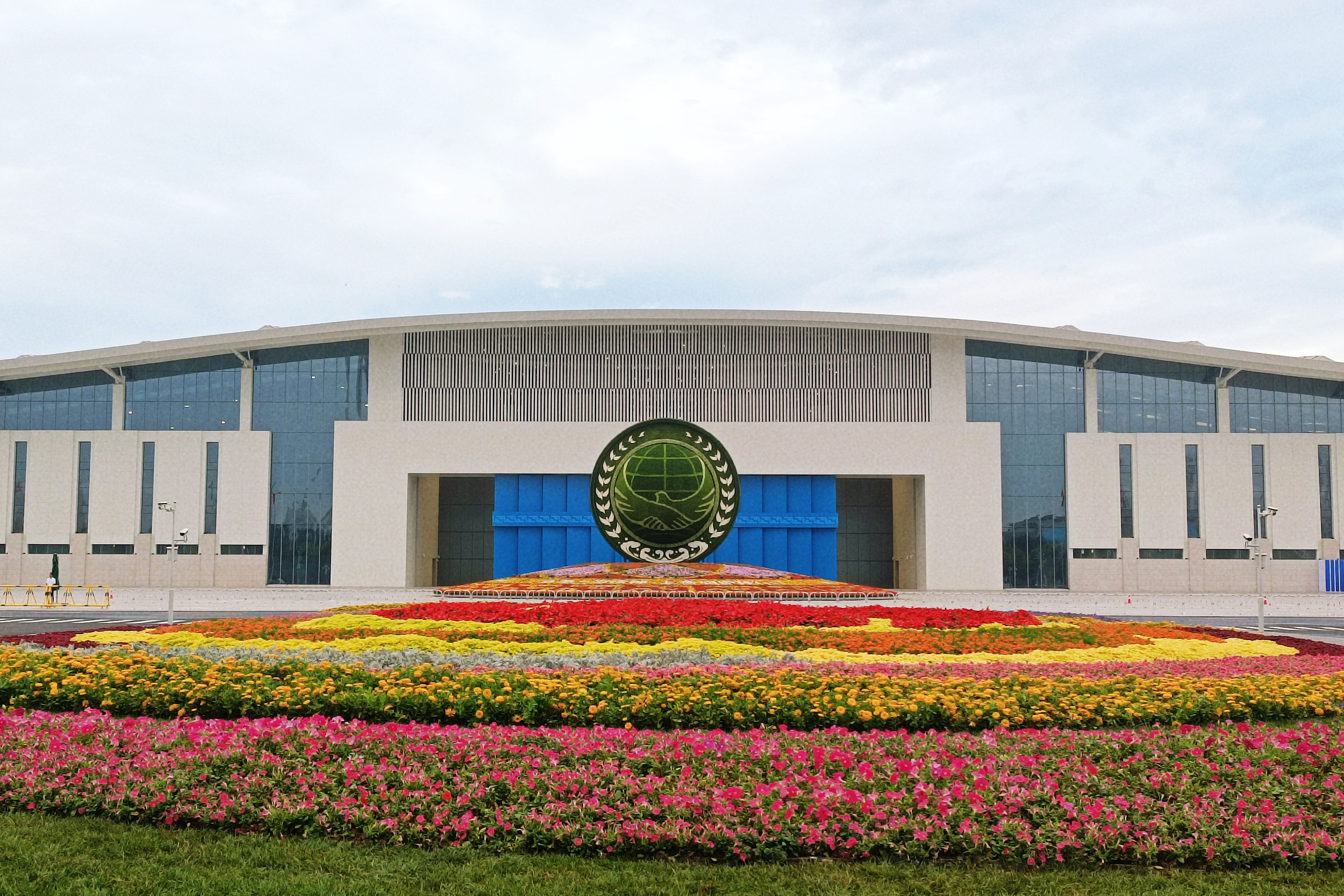
- Interactive map of Tianjin Meijiang Convention and Exhibition Center 天津梅江会展中心
- Location: 18 Youyi South Road, Xiqing District, Tianjin
- Coordinates: 39.04095°N 117.20783°E
- Owner: Tianjin TEDA Construction Group Co., Ltd.

Construction
- Opened: 2010
- Architect: Tianjin Architectural Design Institute

Tianjin Meijiang Convention and Exhibition Center (天津梅江会展中心), abbreviated as MJCEC, is located northwest of Meijiang Park at the intersection of Youyi South Road and the Outer Ring Road in Xiqing District, Tianjin, China. It is a large, modern convention and exhibition venue, funded and built by Tianjin TEDA Construction Group and operated by Tianjin TEDA Convention and Exhibition Management Co., Ltd.

MJCEC has hosted major events such as the World Economic Forum Summer annual meeting and the 2025 Shanghai Cooperation Organization Tianjin Summit.

== History ==
On September 11, 2009, construction of the Tianjin Meijiang Convention and Exhibition Center began in preparation for the 2010 Summer Davos Forum.

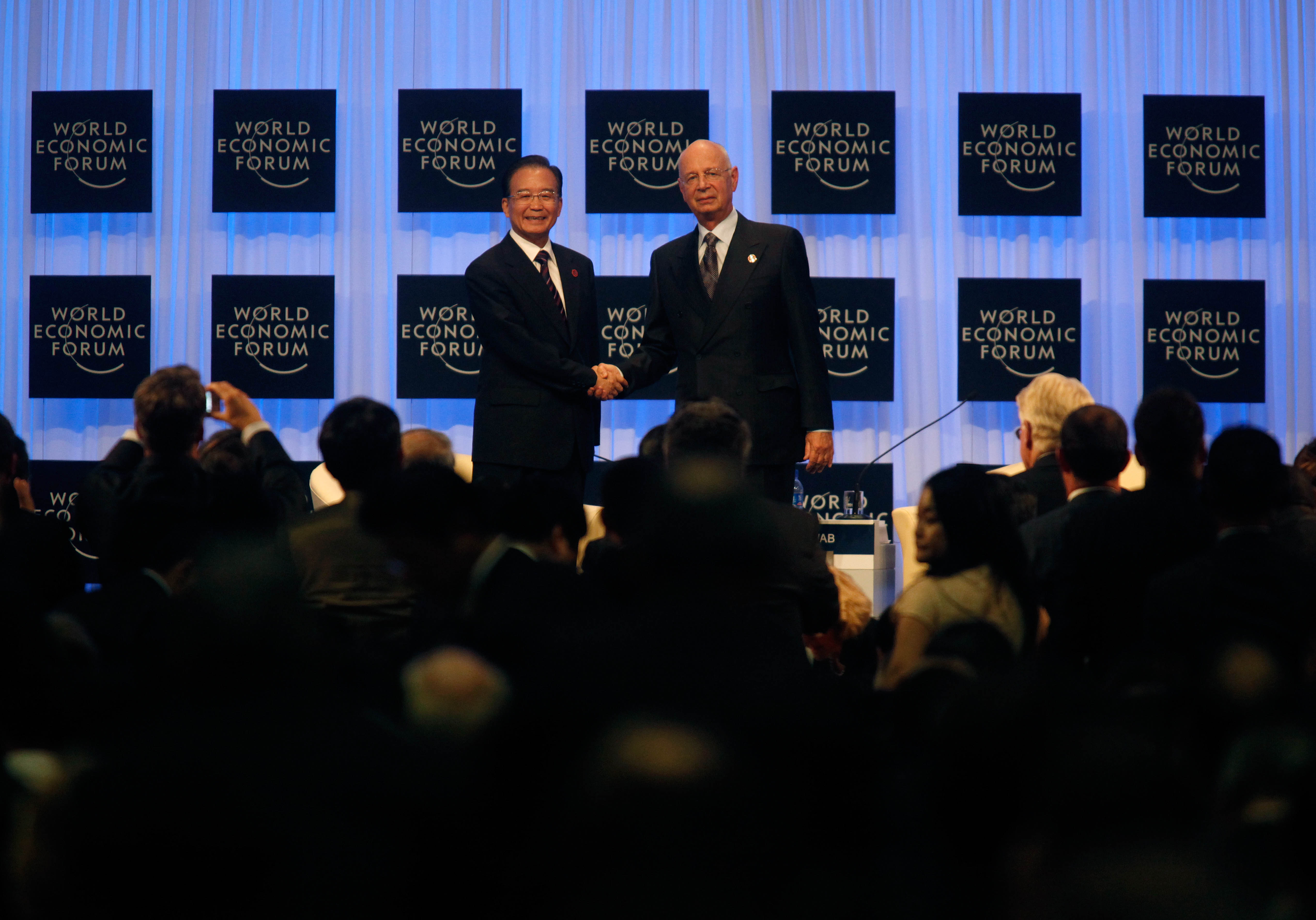
Wen Jiabao and Klaus Schwab in MJCEC

On January 15, 2010, Phase I of the Tianjin Meijiang Convention and Exhibition Center completed its main structural construction and was officially opened within the same year.

In 2011, construction of Phase II of the Meijiang Convention and Exhibition Center began, with a planned total building area of over 280,000 square meters, comprising a central area and two wings.

In 2015, Phases I and II of the center were adjusted to include commercial facilities, hosting Tianjin's first Sam's Club.

In March 2022, in response to the COVID-19 pandemic and to relieve the patient load on designated hospitals such as Tianjin Haihe Hospital, Phase I of the Meijiang Convention and Exhibition Center was temporarily converted into the "Tianjin Meijiang Fangcang Hospital".

In 2025, in preparation for the 2025 Shanghai Cooperation Organization Tianjin Summit, Phase I of the Meijiang Convention and Exhibition Center underwent renovations as the main venue. At the same time, the Tianjin Water Authority constructed and upgraded two nearby stormwater pumping stations and associated pipelines to enhance drainage capacity in the surrounding area.

== Overview ==
=== Phase I Exhibition Hall ===
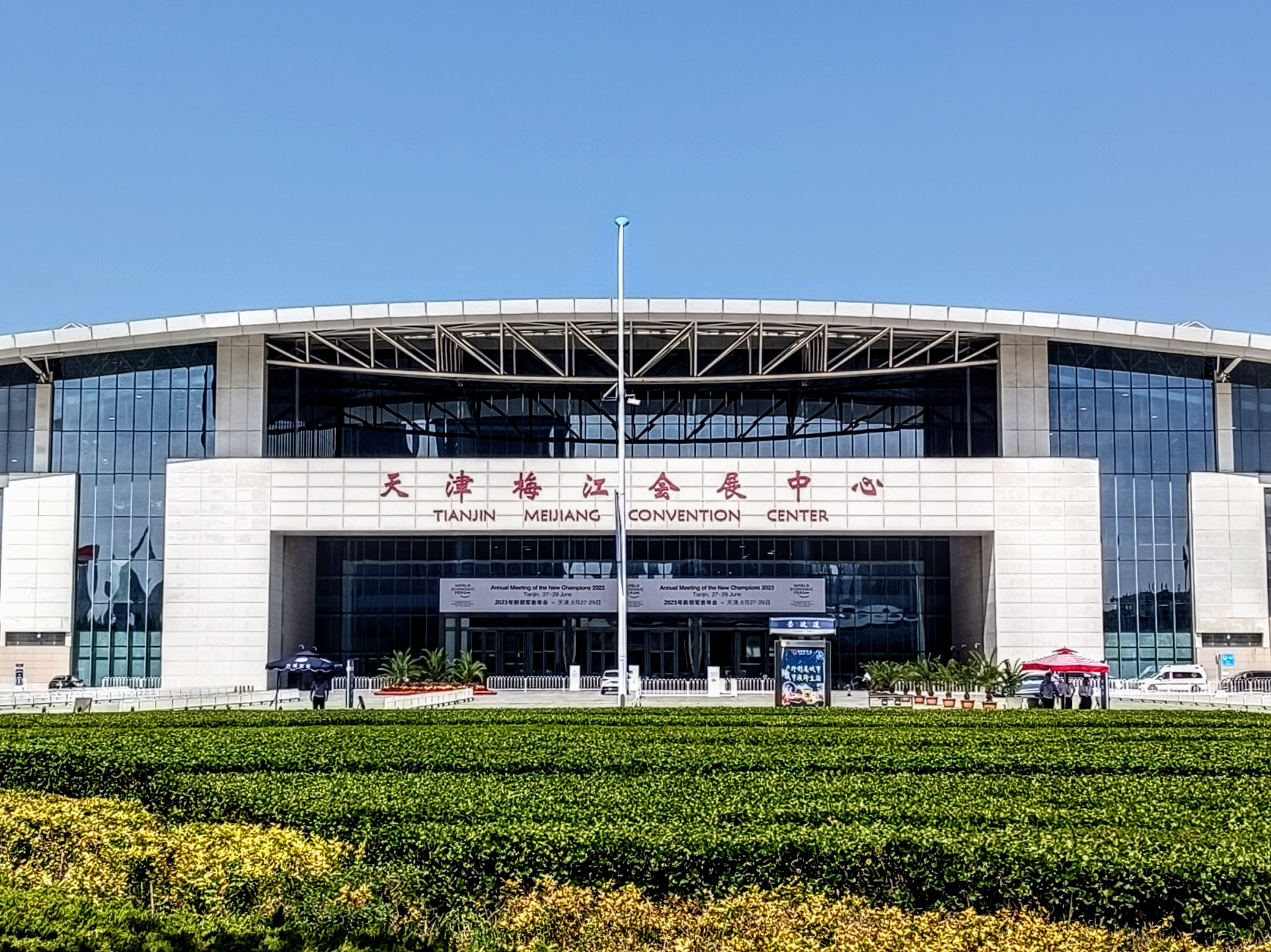
Phase I of Meijiang Convention and Exhibition Center during the 2023 Summer Davos Forum

Phase I of the Meijiang Convention and Exhibition Center completed its main steel structure in January 2010 and officially opened the same year.

The first phase covers approximately 230,000 square meters, with a total building area of 98,000 square meters. It includes four large exhibition halls, two smaller halls, and a registration hall, providing up to 2,600 international standard booths. The main conference hall exceeds 2,000 square meters and is equipped with audio-visual systems, simultaneous interpretation, projection, and stage facilities. An adjacent banquet hall can accommodate up to 1,800 diners. The building features a wave-shaped roof with tempered glass skylights for natural lighting, while four large halls incorporate six glass air-conditioning towers each to enhance energy efficiency and sustainability.

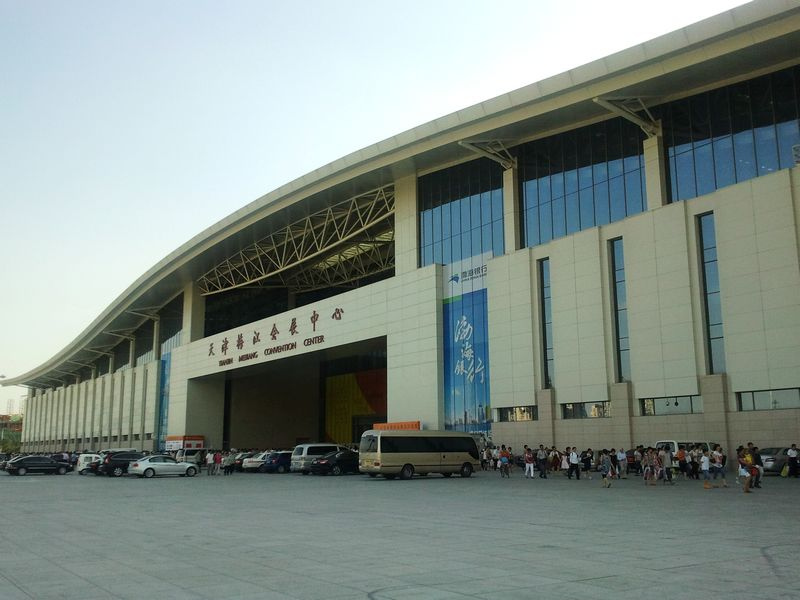
Meijiang Convention and Exhibition Center in 2011

=== Phase II Exhibition Hall ===
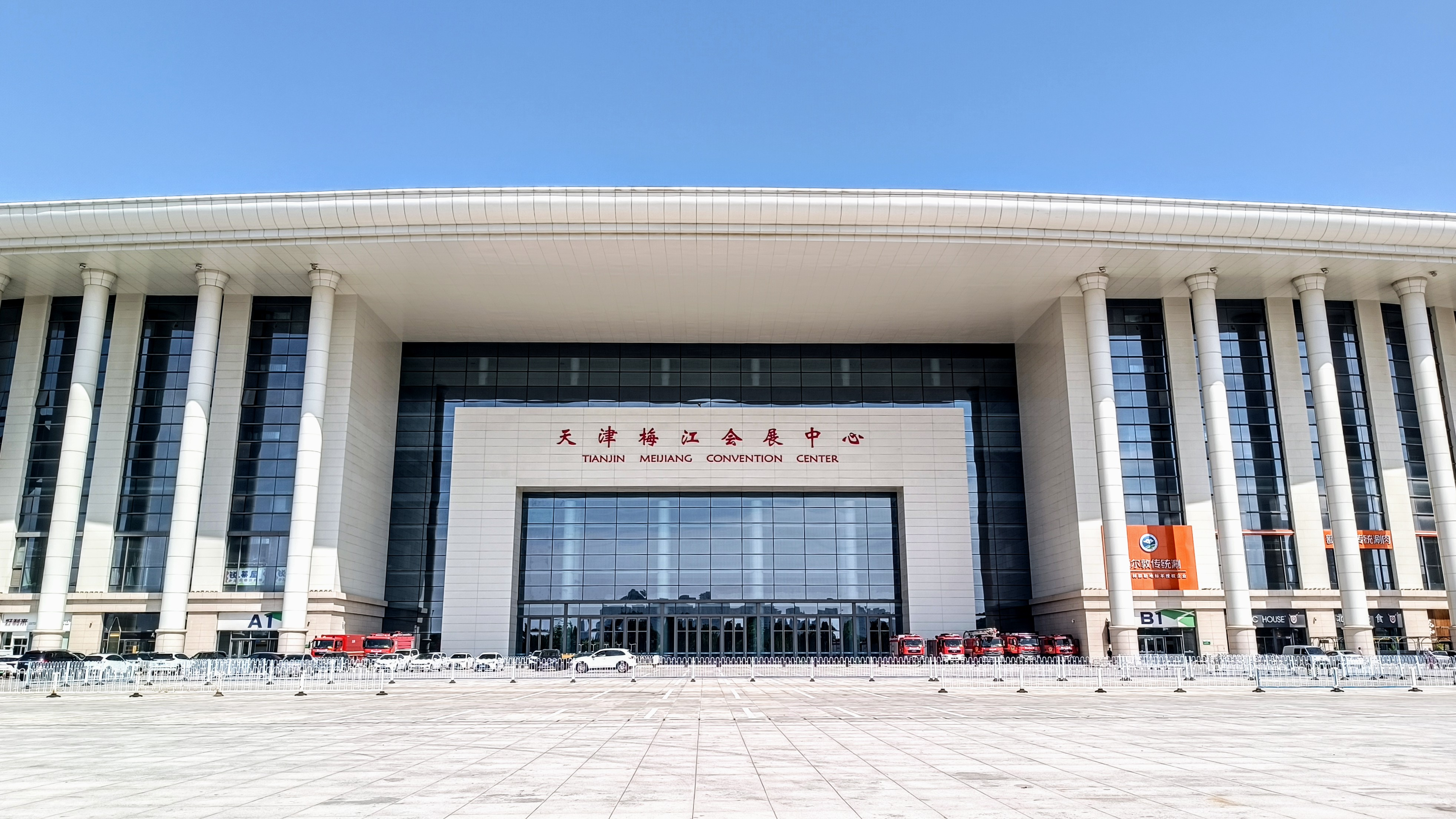
Phase II of Meijiang Convention and Exhibition Center

Phase II is located south of Phase I, covering 20.67 hectares with a total building area of 280,600 square meters. The complex is composed of a central zone and two wings: the central zone (Zone 2) has three floors, while the wings (Zones 1 and 3) have two floors, housing four exhibition halls in total.

In May 2015, the western wing (Zone 1) and the central zone (Zone 2) were repurposed as commercial areas.

== Conferences and Exhibitions ==
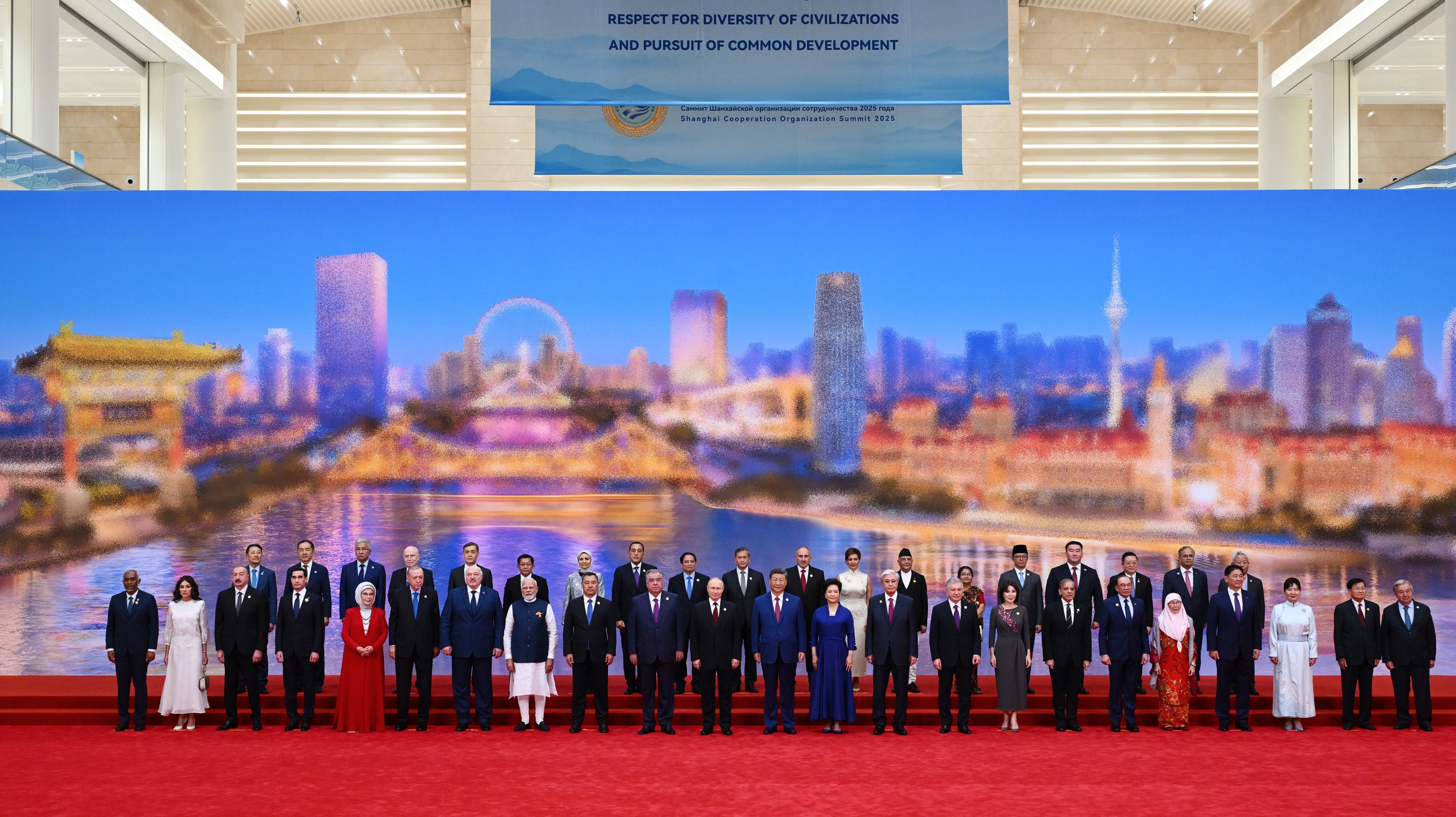
2025 Tianjin SCO summit

- World Economic Forum Summer annual meeting: 2010, 2012, 2014, 2016, 2023, 2025
- 17th China·Tianjin Investment and Trade Fair, June 28, 2010
- Taiwan Excellence Expo, multiple editions
- UN Climate Change Negotiations, 2010
- 5th World Intelligence Congress, May 20–23, 2021
- 2025 Shanghai Cooperation Organization Tianjin Summit, August 31–September 1, 2025

== Transport ==
- Tianjin Metro Line 6: Meijianghuizhanzhongxin station.
- Tianjin Metro Line 7: Meijianghuizhanzhongxinnan station (under construction, opening in 2025).

== See also ==
- National Exhibition and Convention Center (Tianjin)
