= National Data Administration =

Chinese national data regulator

- 国家数据局
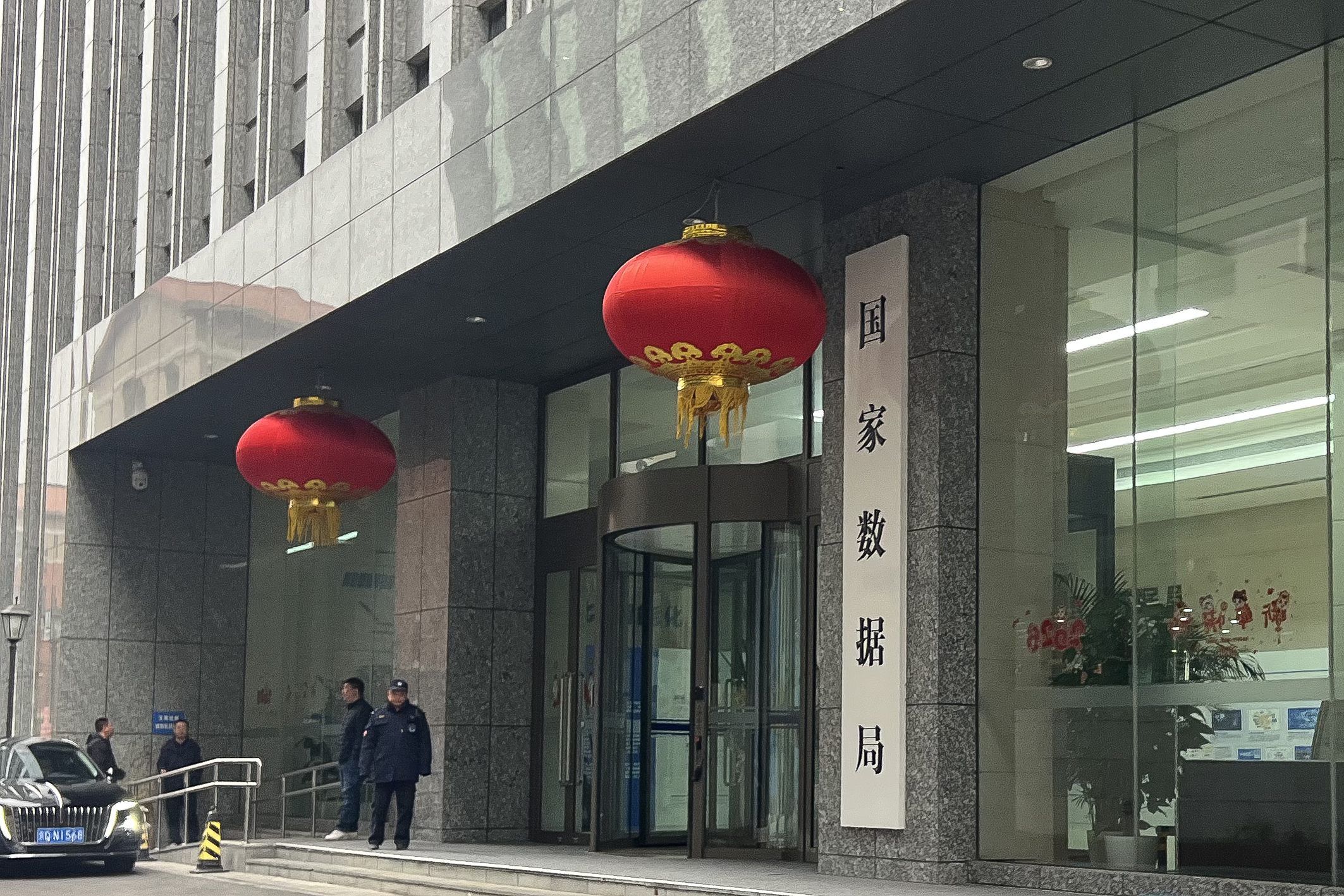
- National Data Administration housed at the National Development and Reform Commission

Agency overview
- Formed: October 25, 2023; 2 years ago
- Jurisdiction: China
- Headquarters: 25 Yuetan North Street, Xicheng District, Beijing
- Agency executive: Liu Liehong, Director
- Parent agency: National Development and Reform Commission
- Website: www.nda.gov.cn

National Data Administration
- Simplified Chinese: 国家数据局
- Traditional Chinese: 國家數據局
Transcriptions
Standard Mandarin
- Hanyu Pinyin: Guójiā Shùjùjú

The National Data Administration (NDA) is a national bureau under the management of the National Development and Reform Commission (NDRC) of the State Council of China.

== History ==
The NDA was proposed in March 2023 as part of the plan on reforming Party and state institutions, which was approved by the National People's Congress. The NDA took over several responsibilities from the Cyberspace Administration of China and the NDRC, including promoting smart cities and the exchange of information resources across industries.

On 28 July 2023, Liu Liehong was appointed as the director of the NDA. The NDA was officially inaugurated on 25 October.

== Functions ==
The NDA, an agency under the National Development and Reform Commission, is responsible for data and its regulation in China. According to the plan that established the agency, the NDA is responsible for "coordinating and promoting the construction of data infrastructure, coordinating the integration, sharing, development and utilization of data resources". The NDA is also responsible for regulating the digital economy and implementing a national big data strategy.

== Leadership ==
=== Directors ===
Name	Chinese name	Took office	Left office	Ref.
Liu Liehong	刘烈宏	28 July 2023	Incumbent	
