= Society Work Department =

Agency of the Central Committee of the Chinese Communist Party

Society Work Department of the Central Committee of the Chinese Communist Party
- 中国共产党中央委员会社会工作部
- Emblem of the Chinese Communist Party

Agency overview
- Formed: 2023; 3 years ago
- Type: Department directly reporting to the Central Committee; Ministerial level agency
- Jurisdiction: Chinese Communist Party
- Headquarters: Beijing
- Minister responsible: Wu Hansheng, Head
- Parent agency: Central Committee of the Chinese Communist Party
- Child agency: National Public Complaints and Proposals Administration
- Website: www.zyshgzb.gov.cn

Footnotes
- * Maintains full minister-level rank

Society Work Department
- Simplified Chinese: 中国共产党中央委员会社会工作部
- Traditional Chinese: 中國共產黨中央委員會社會工作部
Transcriptions
Standard Mandarin
- Hanyu Pinyin: Zhōngguó Gòngchǎndǎng Zhōngyāng Wěiyuánhuì Shèhuì Gōngzuò Bù

The Society Work Department is a ministry-level agency under the Central Committee of the Chinese Communist Party, responsible for handling public complaints and proposals, nationwide industry associations and chambers of commerce, and party building work for societal organizations.

== History ==
The Society Work Department was established in March 2023 under General Secretary of the Chinese Communist Party Xi Jinping as part of the plan on reforming Party and state institutions. On 8 July 2023, Wu Hansheng was appointed as the first head of the department. By February 2024, all provincial-level divisions in China had set up Social Work Departments, a task given to provincial, municipal, and county-level party committees. In November 2024, Xi stated that the department's functions were "vital to the party's long-term governance."

== Function ==
The department oversees the interactions of the CCP with civic groups, chambers of commerce and industry groups. It works with CCP cells to promote party-building work in mixed-ownership and non-public enterprises, industry associations and chambers of commerce, new employment groups and "small, individual, and specialized" enterprises. It helps guide non-profit social organizations and volunteers at the grassroots level. It additionally handles public petitions and grievances, and has a "unified leadership" over the National Public Complaints and Proposals Administration. The Central Leading Group for Social Governance, created in 2025, is located within the department.

== List of directors ==
Officeholder	Term start	Term end	General secretary	Ref.
Wu Hansheng	8 July 2023	Incumbent	Xi Jinping	
