= Working Committee of Central and State Organs =

Chinese Communist Party agency

Working Committee of the Central and State Organs of the Central Committee of the Chinese Communist Party
- 中国共产党中央委员会 中央和国家机关工作委员会
- Emblem of the Chinese Communist Party

Agency overview
- Formed: 21 March 2018; 8 years ago
- Preceding agency: Work Committee for Offices Directly under the Central Committee of the Chinese Communist Party State Organs Work Committee of the Central Committee of the Chinese Communist Party
- Type: Ministerial level
- Jurisdiction: Chinese Communist Party
- Headquarters: Xicheng District, Beijing
- Agency executive: Cai Qi, Secretary
- Parent agency: Central Committee of the Chinese Communist Party
- Website: www.qizhiwang.org.cn

Chinese name
- Simplified Chinese: 中国共产党中央委员会中央和国家机关工作委员会
- Traditional Chinese: 中國共產黨中央委員會中央和國家機關工作委員會
Transcriptions
Standard Mandarin
- Hanyu Pinyin: Zhōngguó Gòngchǎndǎng Zhōngyāng Wěiyuánhuì Zhōngyāng Hé Guójiā Jīguān Gōngzuò Wěiyuánhuì

Working Committee of the Central and State Organs of the Central Committee of the Chinese Communist Party is an agency dispatched by the Central Committee of the Chinese Communist Party, responsible for the work of the central and state organs of the CCP. It is mainly responsible for organizing, planning, and deploying the work of the CCP in central and state organs.

== History ==
In March 2018, the responsibilities of the Work Committee for Offices Directly under the Central Committee of the Chinese Communist Party and the State Organs Work Committee of the Central Committee of the Chinese Communist Party were integrated to form the Working Committee of the Central and State Organs of the Central Committee of the Chinese Communist Party as part of the deepening the reform of the Party and state institutions.

== List of leaders ==
=== Secretaries ===
Name (English)	Name (Chinese)	Tenure begins	Tenure ends	Note
Ding Xuexiang	丁薛祥	March 2018	April 2023	
Cai Qi	蔡奇	April 2023		

=== Secretaries of the Discipline Inspection and Supervision Commission ===
Name (English)	Name (Chinese)	Tenure begins	Tenure ends	Note
Hou Kai	侯凯	March 2018	June 2020	
Ren Zhengxiao	任正晓	December 2020	July 2022	
Wang Aiwen	王爱文	July 2022		
