= Tenth East Asia Summit =

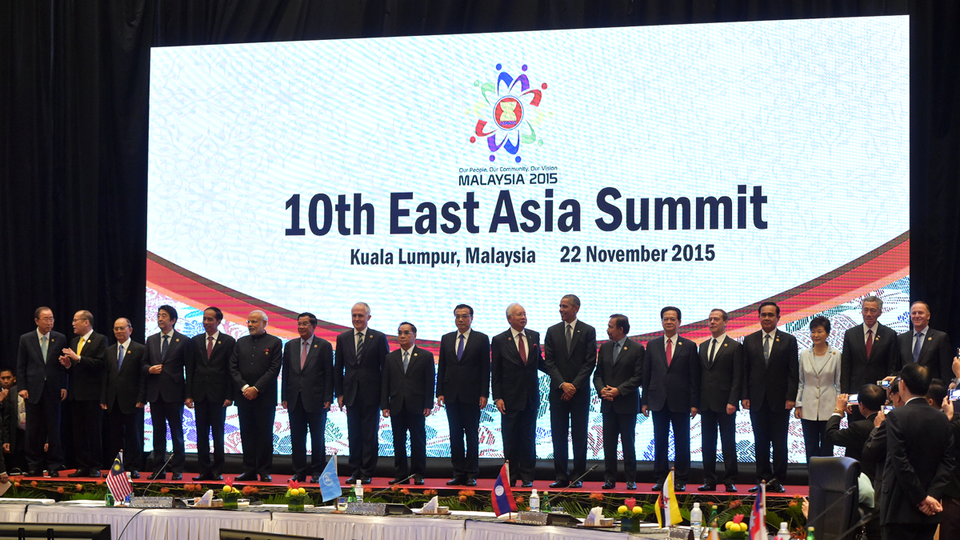
- Leaders at the summit.
- Host country: Malaysia
- Date: November 21–22, 2015
- Cities: Kuala Lumpur
- Participants: EAS members
- Follows: Ninth East Asia Summit
- Precedes: Eleventh East Asia Summit

The Tenth East Asia Summit was held in Kuala Lumpur, Malaysia on November 21–22, 2015. The East Asia Summit is an annual meeting of national leaders from the East Asian region and adjoining countries.

== Attending delegations ==
The heads of state and heads of government of the eighteen countries participated in the summit.

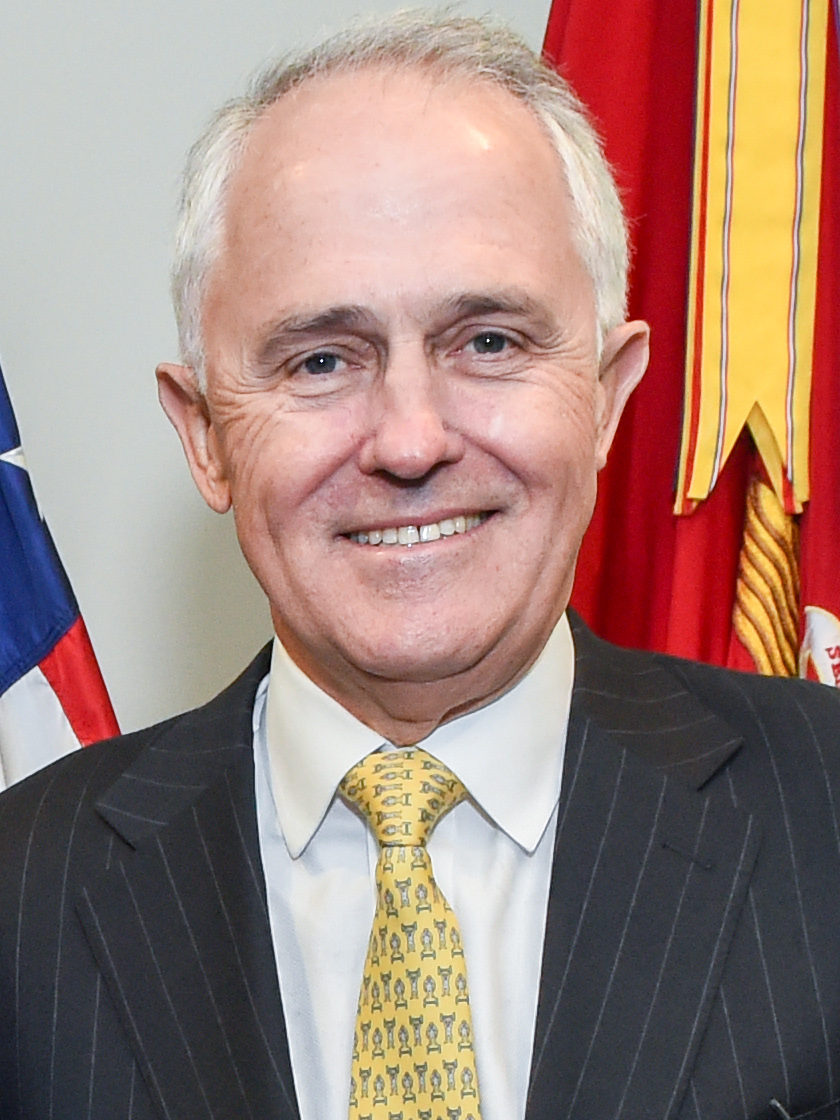
(Australia) Australia
Malcolm Turnbull
Prime Minister

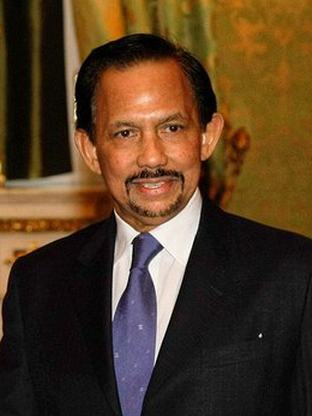
(Brunei) Brunei
Hassanal Bolkiah
Sultan & Prime Minister

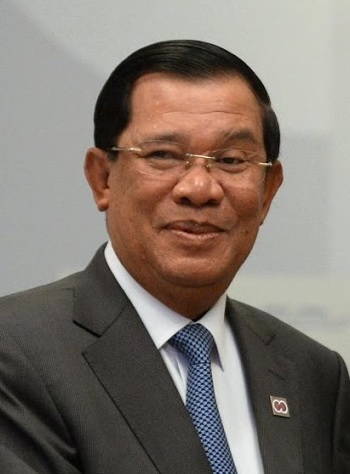
Cambodia
Hun Sen
Prime Minister

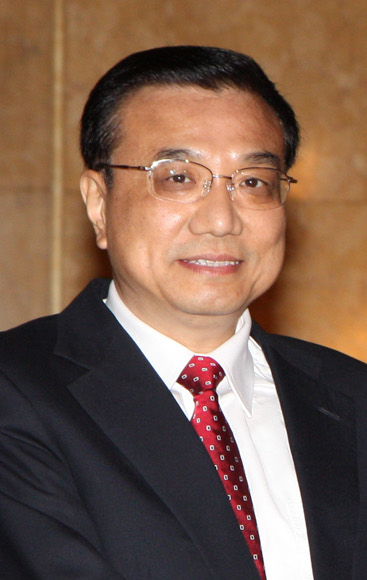
(China) China
Li Keqiang
Premier

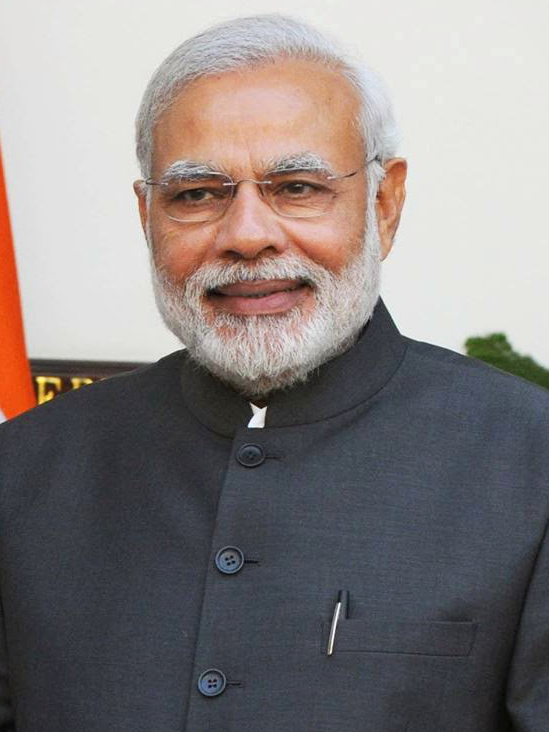
(India) India
Narendra Modi
Prime Minister

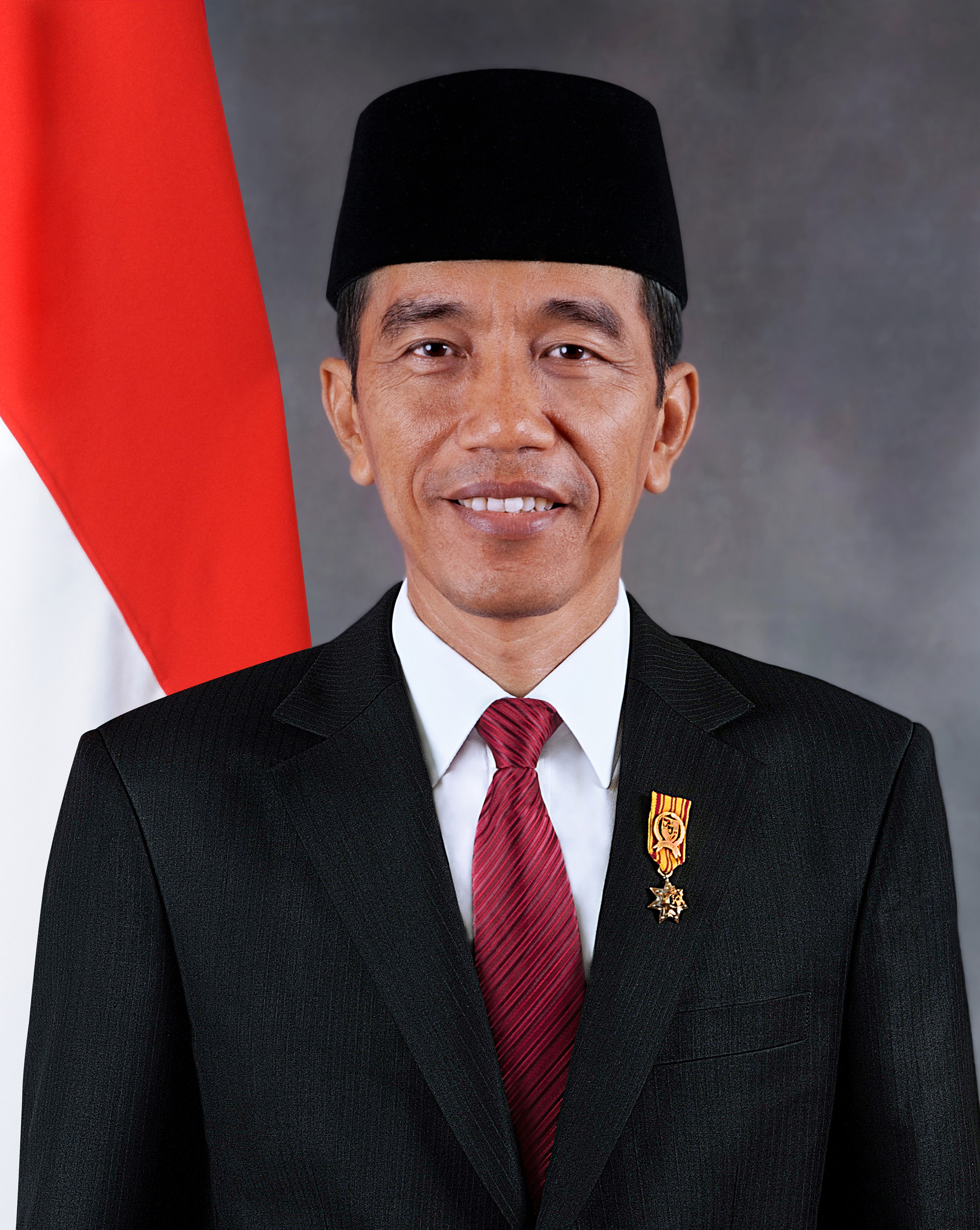
(Indonesia) Indonesia
Joko Widodo
President

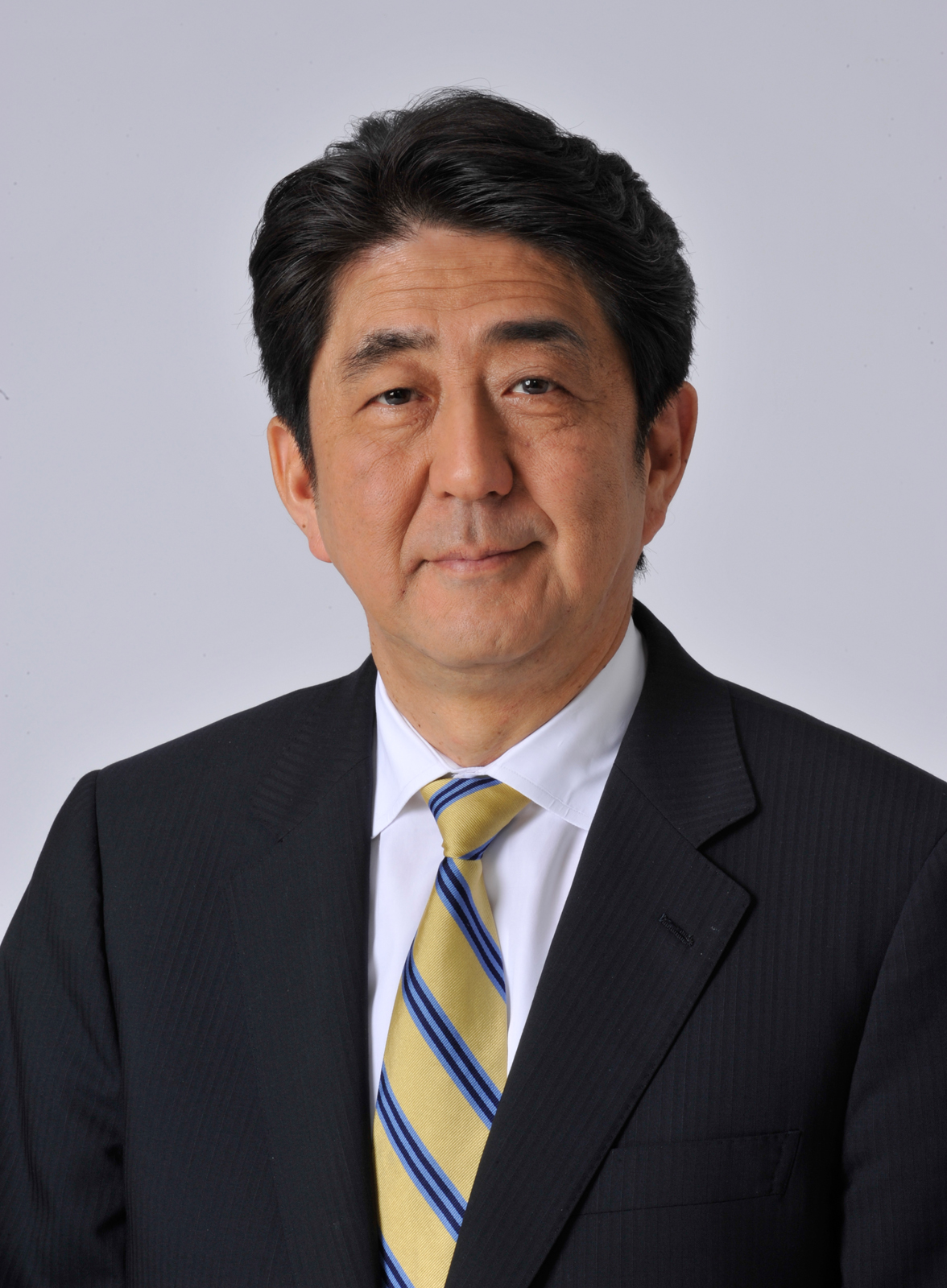
(Japan) Japan
Shinzō Abe
Prime Minister

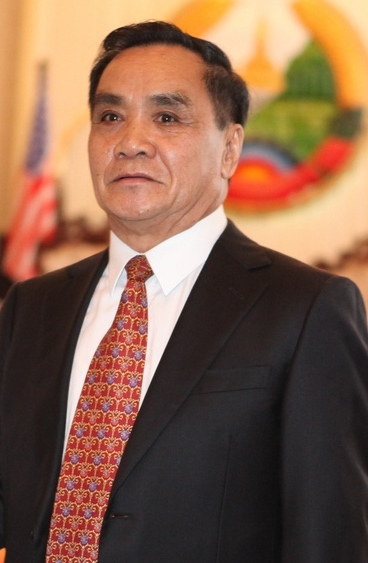
(Laos) Laos
Thongsing Thammavong
Prime Minister

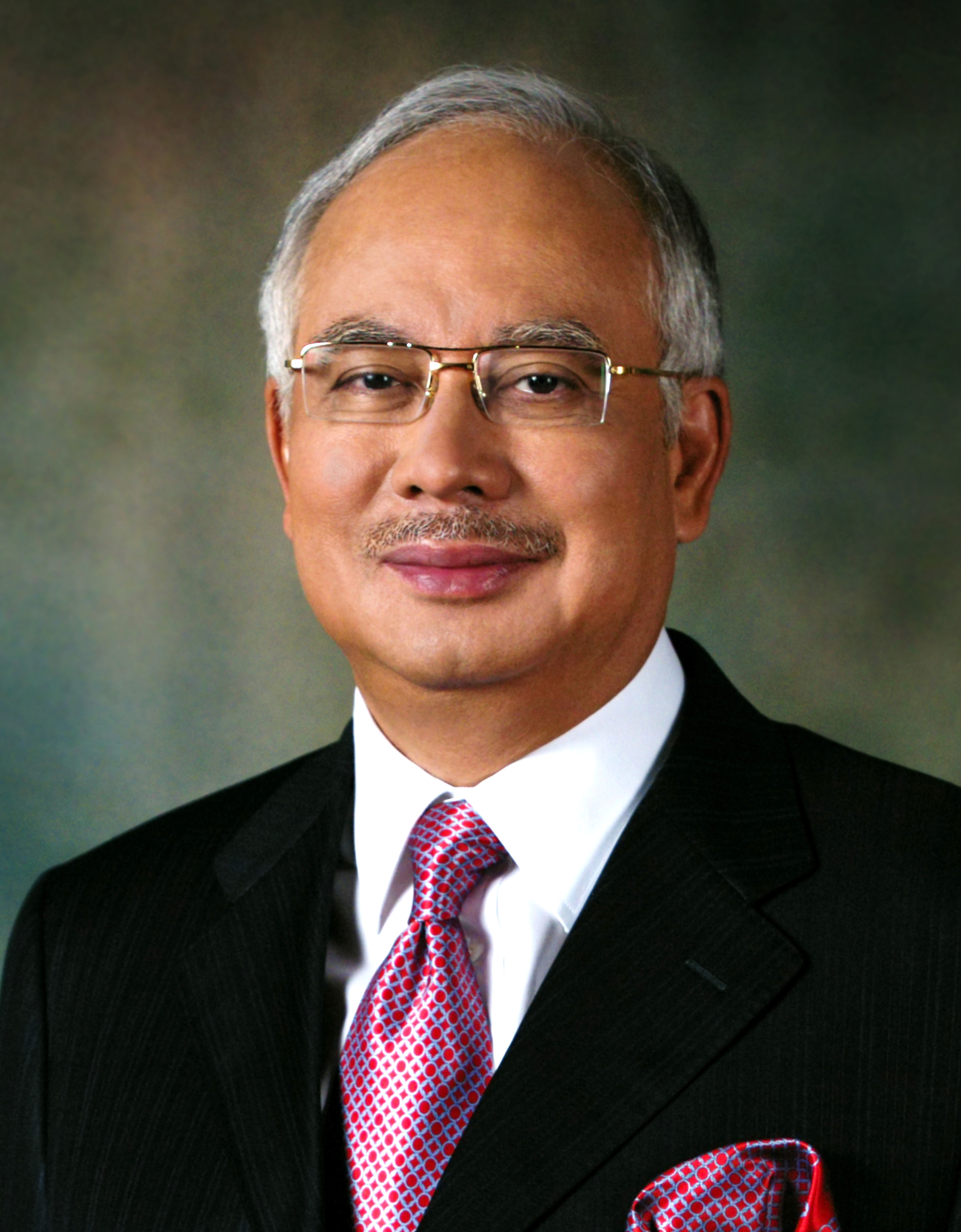
(Malaysia) Malaysia
Najib Razak
Prime Minister
(Chairperson)

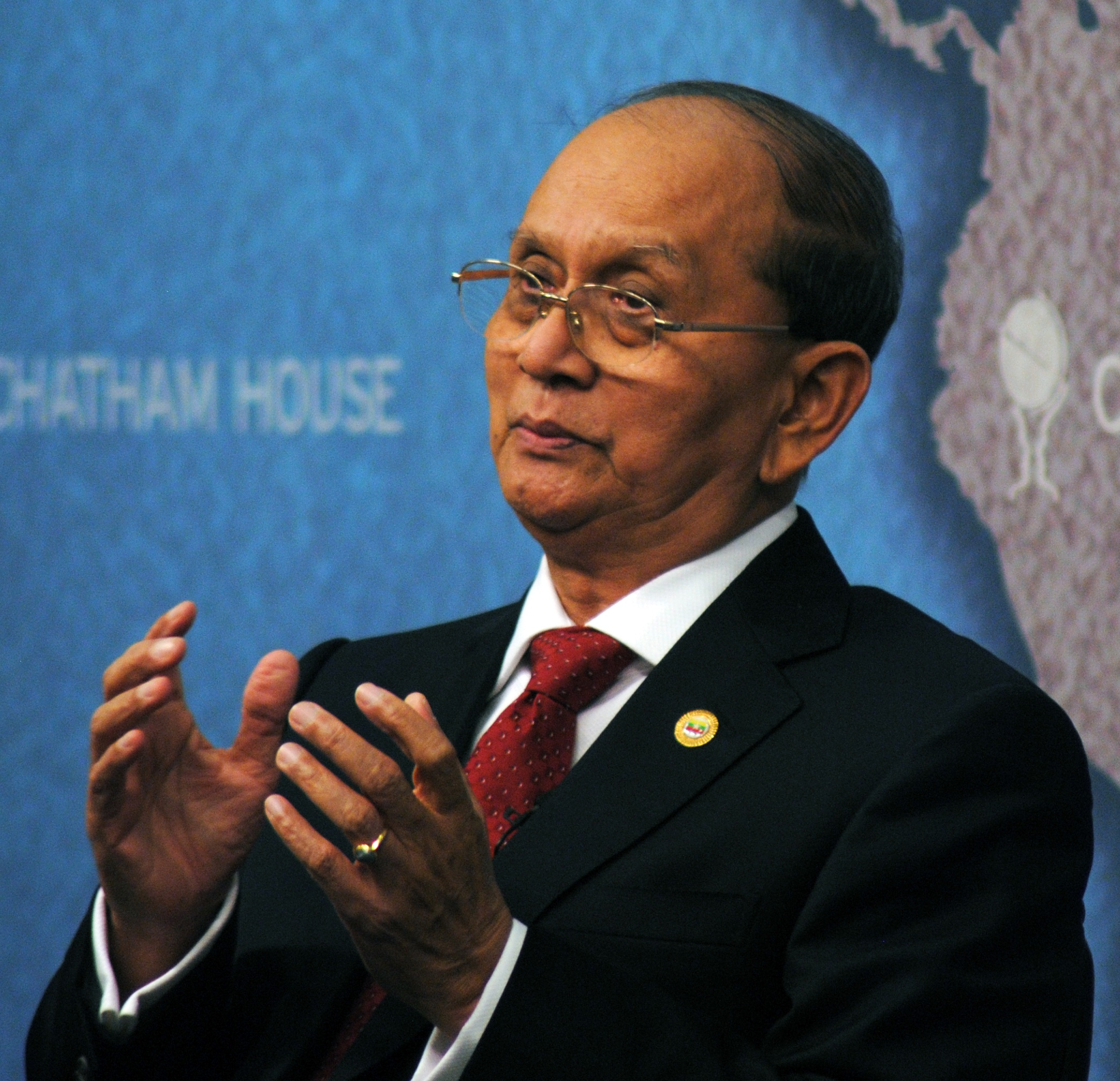
Myanmar
Thein Sein
President

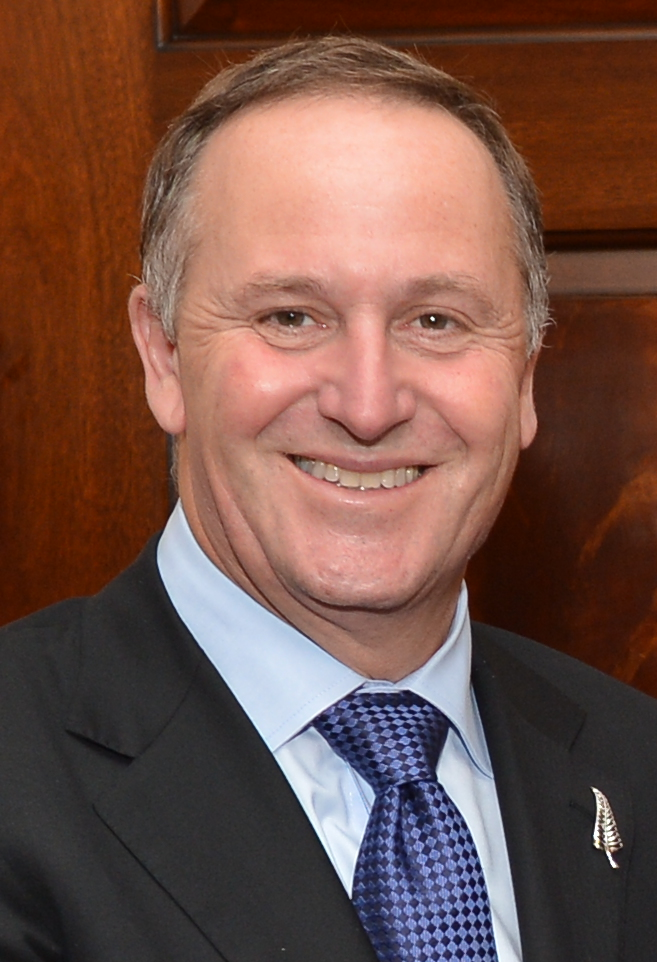
(New Zealand) New Zealand
John Key
Prime Minister

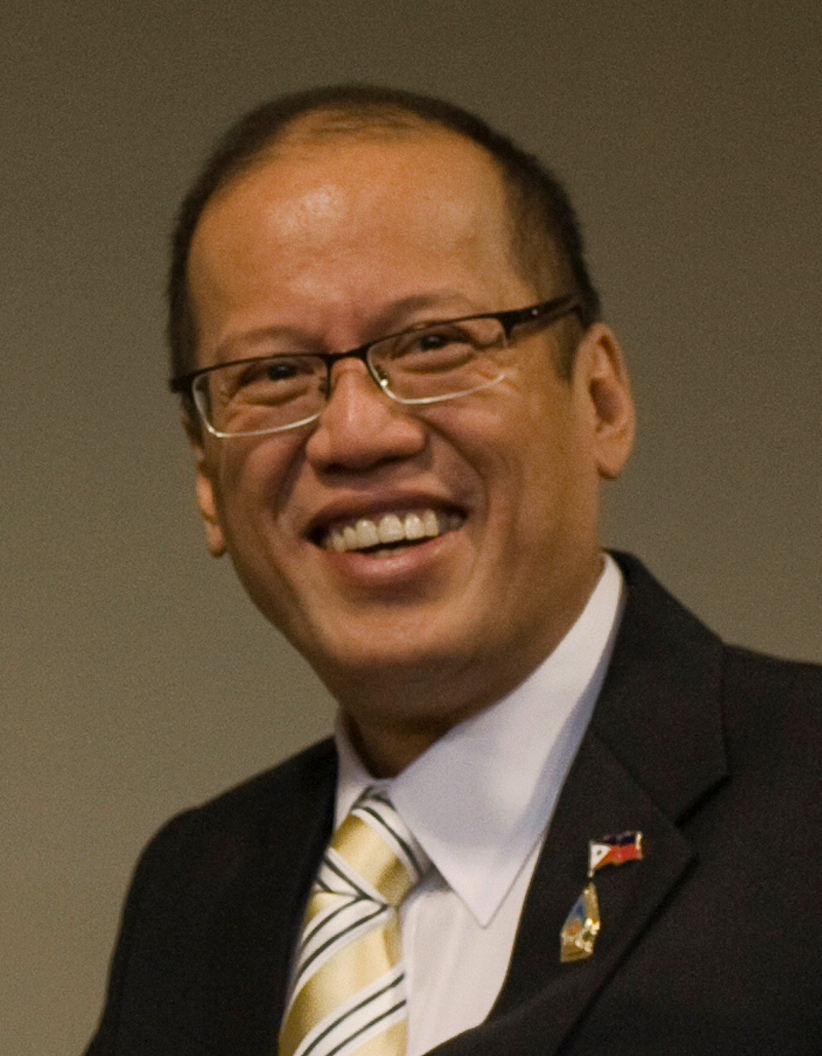
(Philippines) Philippines
Benigno Aquino III
President

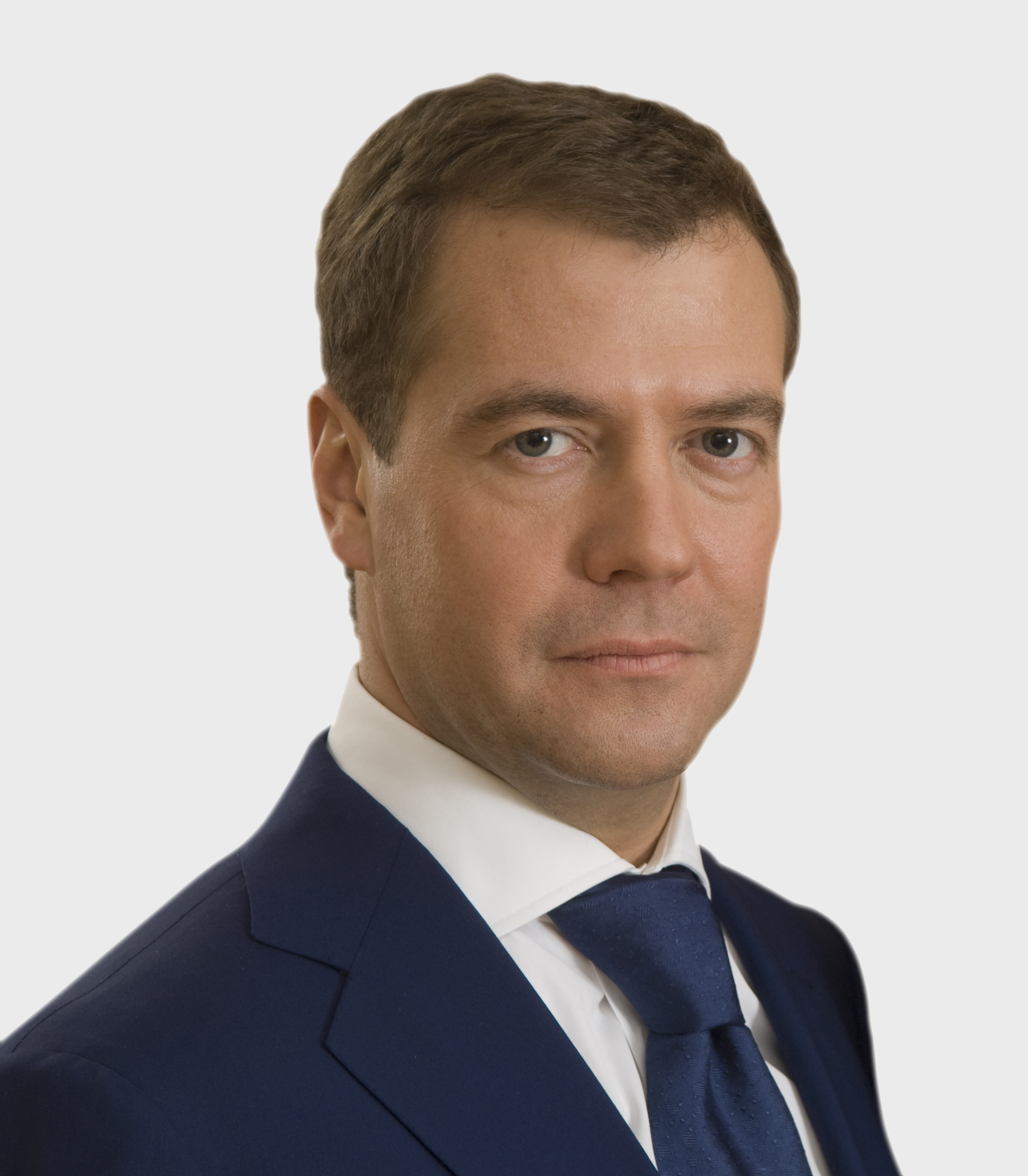
(Russia) Russia
Dmitry Medvedev
Prime Minister

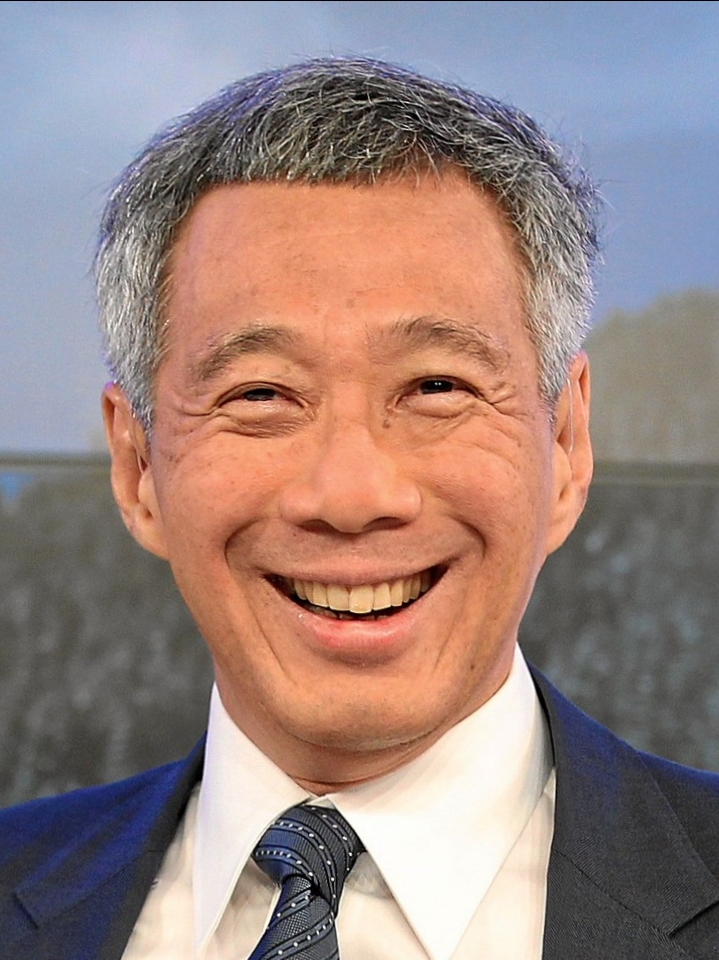
(Singapore) Singapore
Lee Hsien Loong
Prime Minister

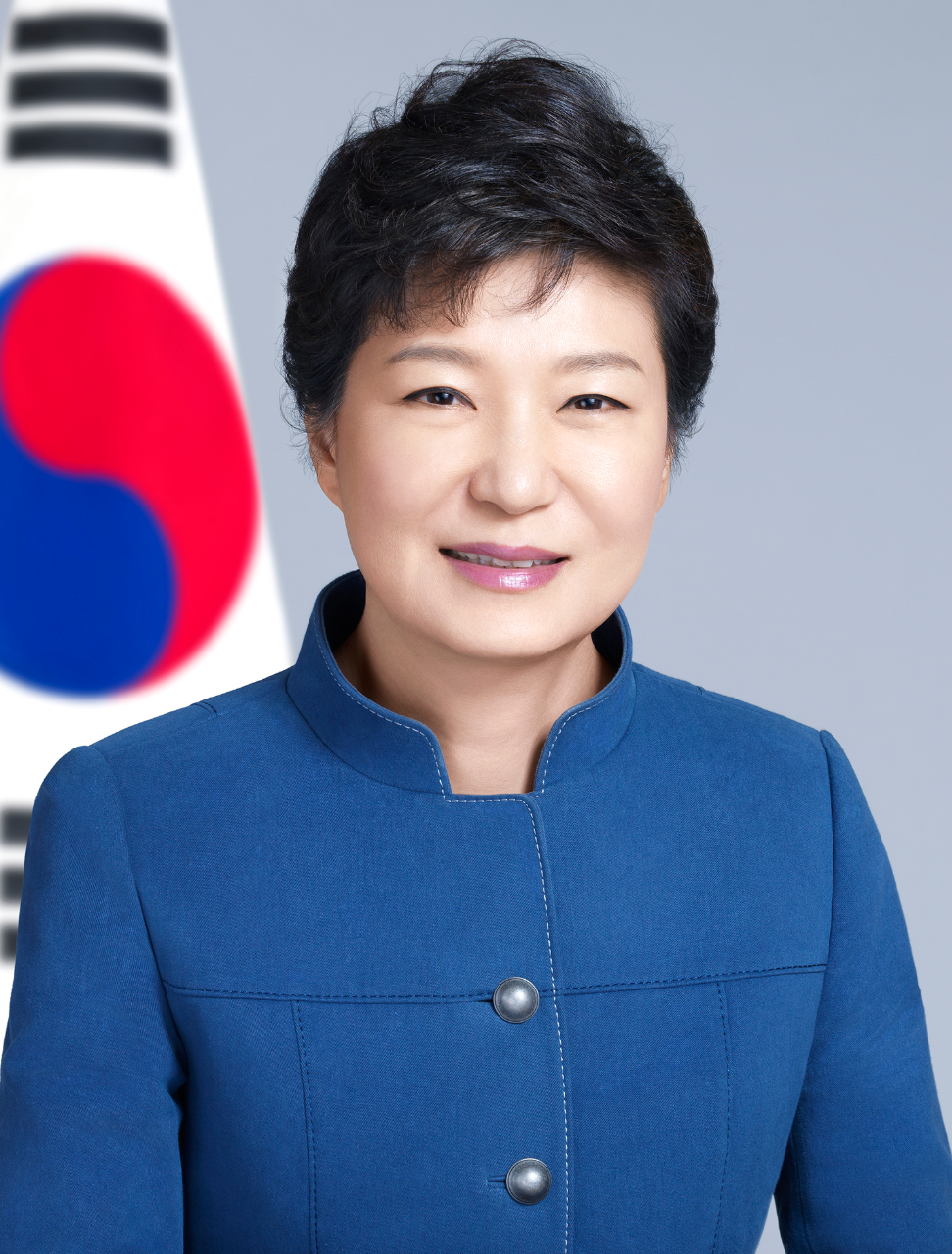
South Korea
Park Geun-hye
President

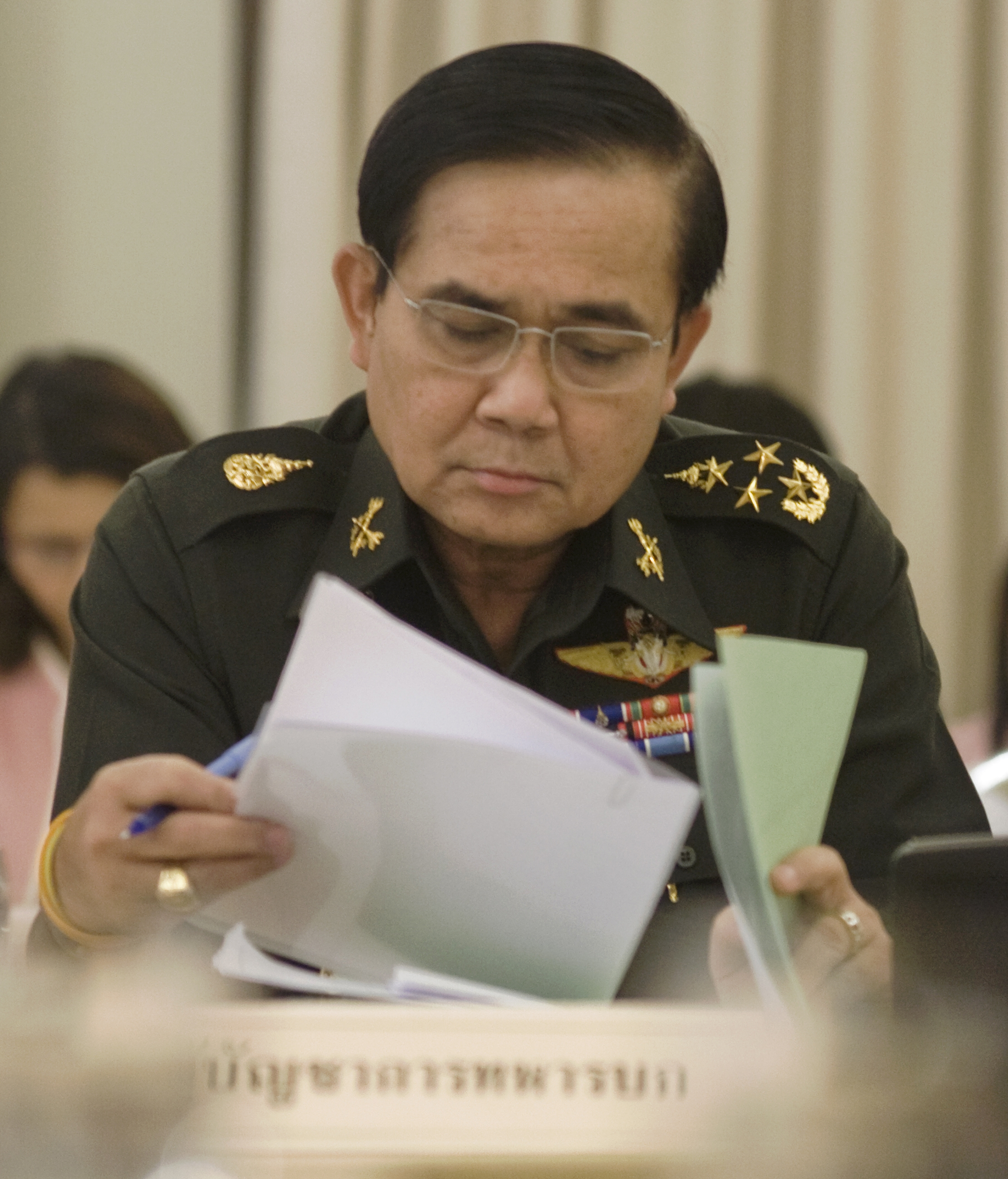
(Thailand) Thailand
Prayuth Chan-ocha
Prime Minister

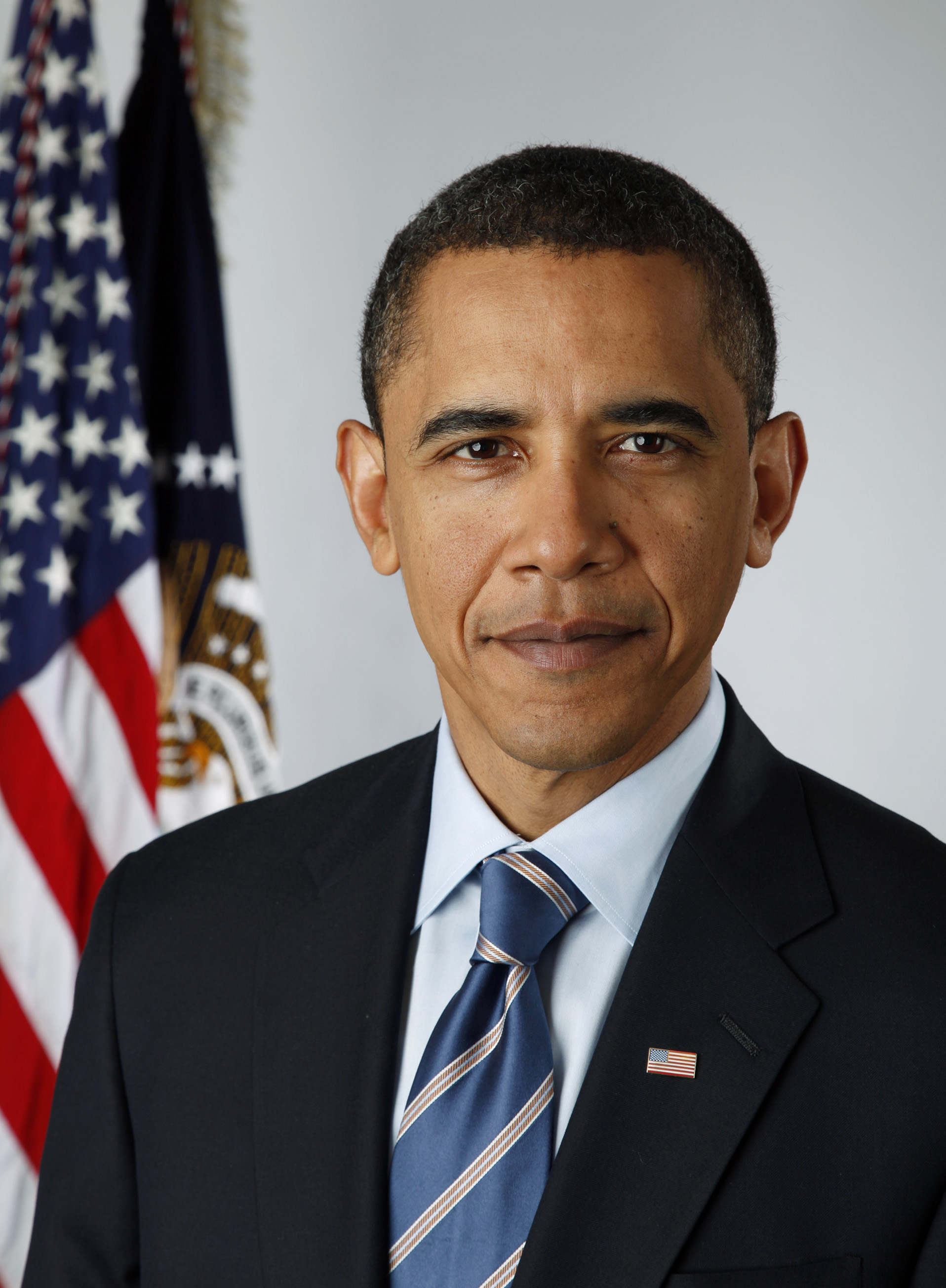
(United States) United States
Barack Obama
President

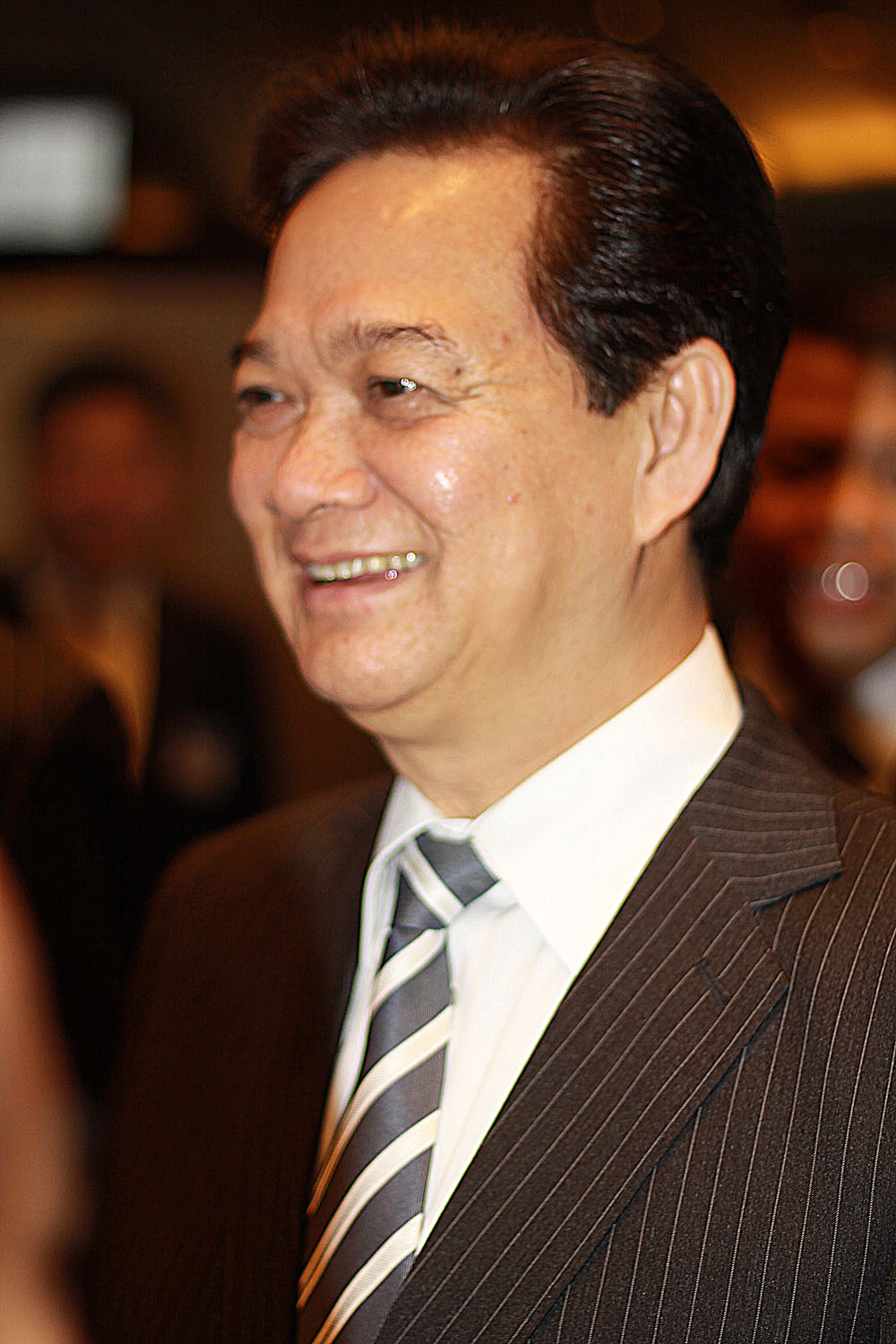
Vietnam
Nguyễn Tấn Dũng
Prime Minister

== Agenda ==
The agenda of EAS meeting was the establishment of an ASEAN Community and the signing of the U.S.-ASEAN strategic partnership. The meeting also saw the official extension of the plan of action (POA) to implement the Phnom Penh Declaration on the East Asia Summit Development Initiative until the end of 2017.
