= Eleventh East Asia Summit =

2016 summit in Vientiane, Laos

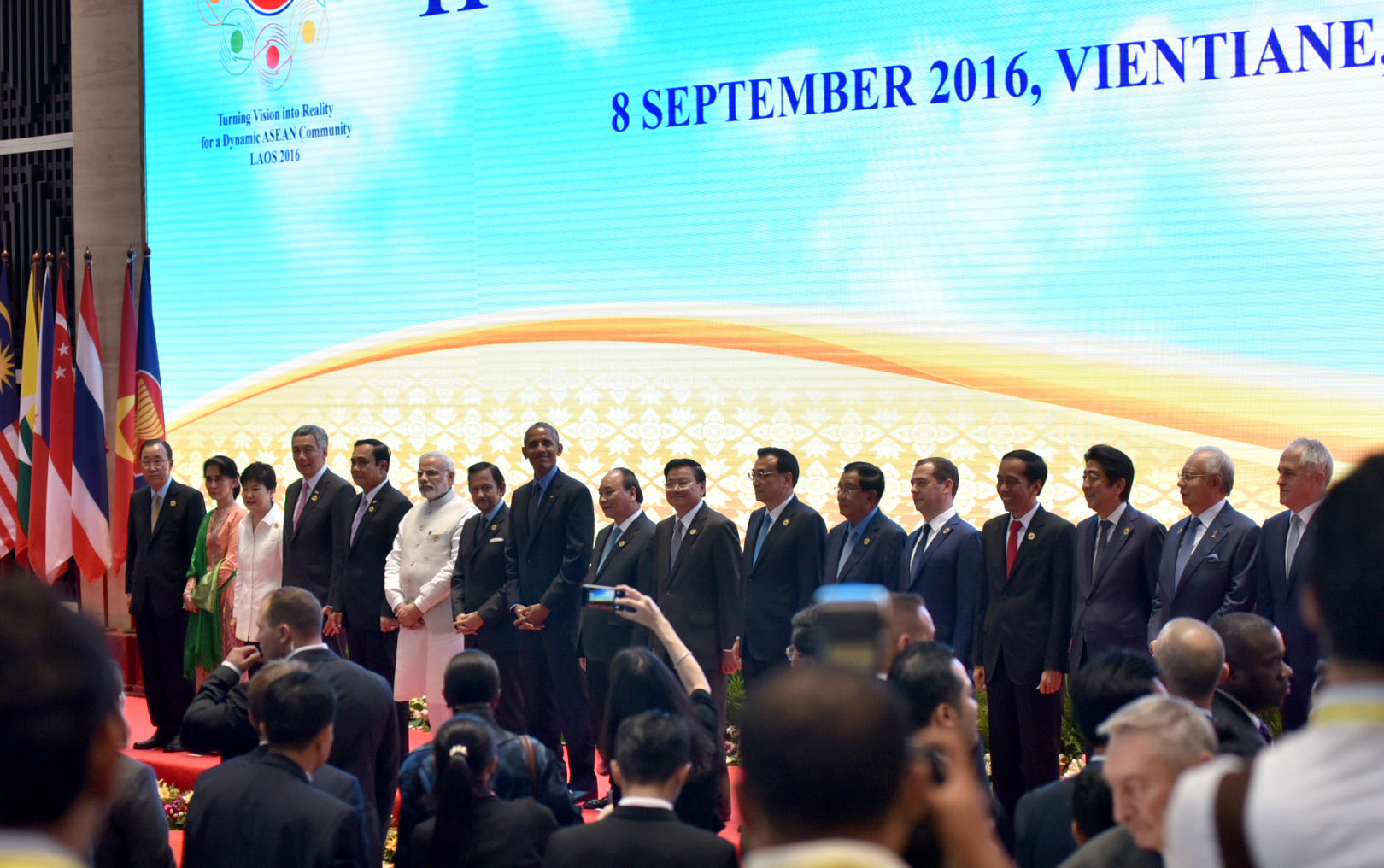
- Leaders at the summit.
- Host country: Laos
- Date: 6–8 September 2016
- Cities: Vientiane
- Participants: EAS members
- Follows: Tenth East Asia Summit
- Precedes: Twelfth East Asia Summit

The Eleventh East Asia Summit was held in Vientiane, Laos on 8 September 2016. The East Asia Summit is an annual meeting of national leaders from the East Asian region and other countries including the United States and Russia.

== Attending delegations ==
The heads of state and heads of government of eighteen countries participated in the summit.

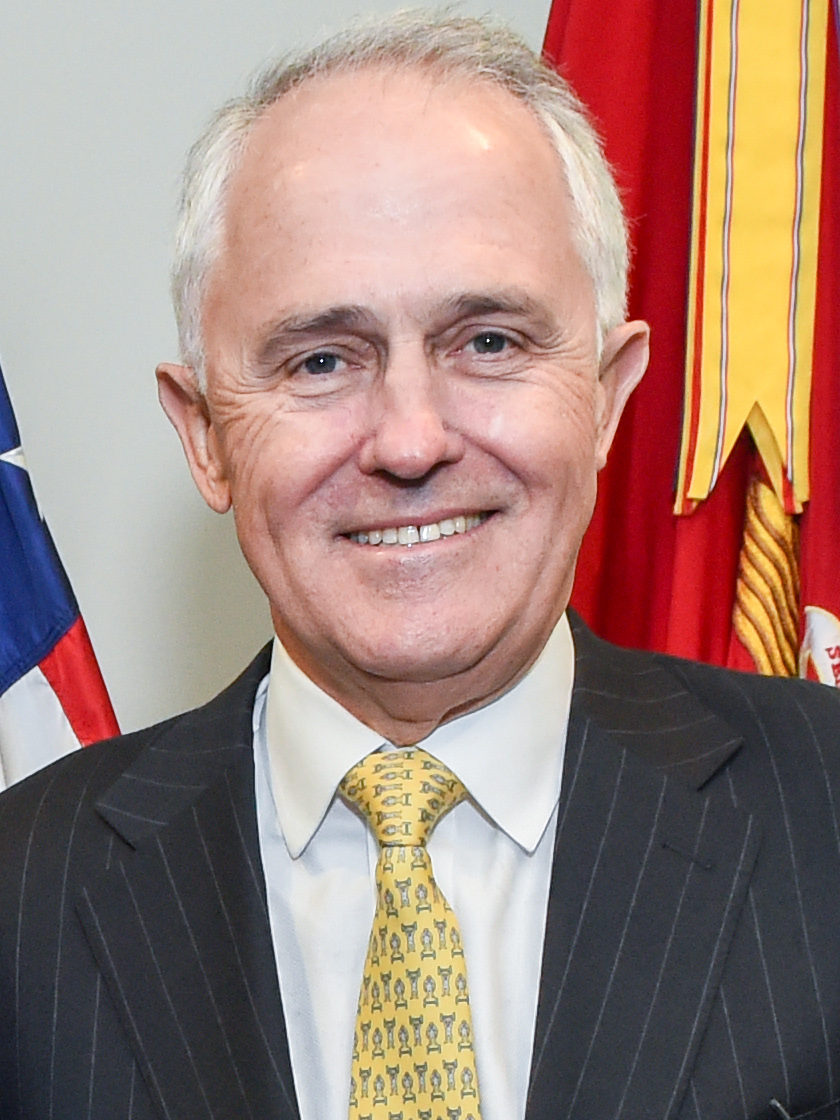
(Australia) Australia
Malcolm Turnbull
Prime Minister

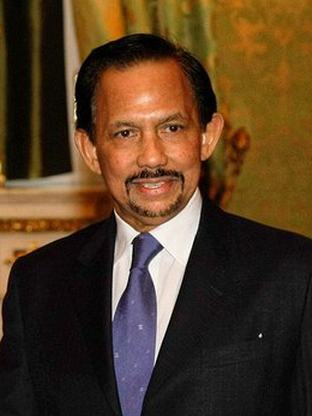
(Brunei) Brunei
Hassanal Bolkiah
Sultan & Prime Minister

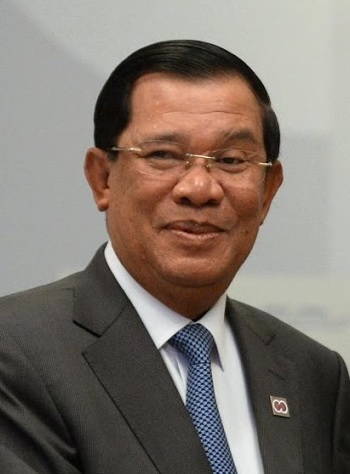
Cambodia
Hun Sen
Prime Minister

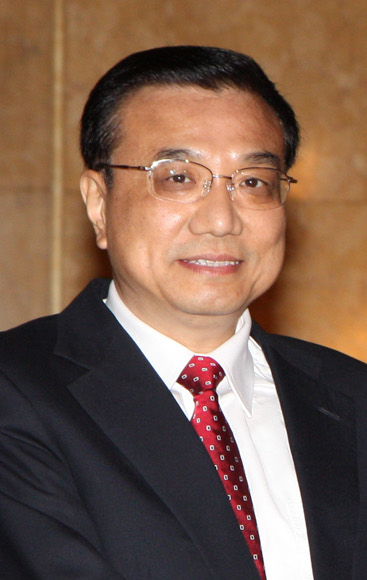
(China) China
Li Keqiang
Premier

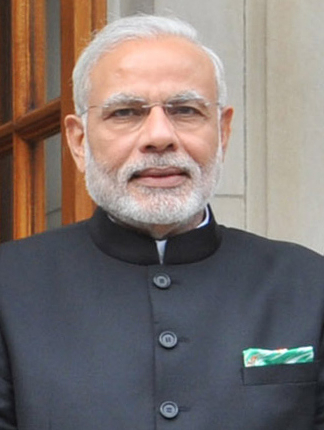
(India) India
Narendra Modi
Prime Minister

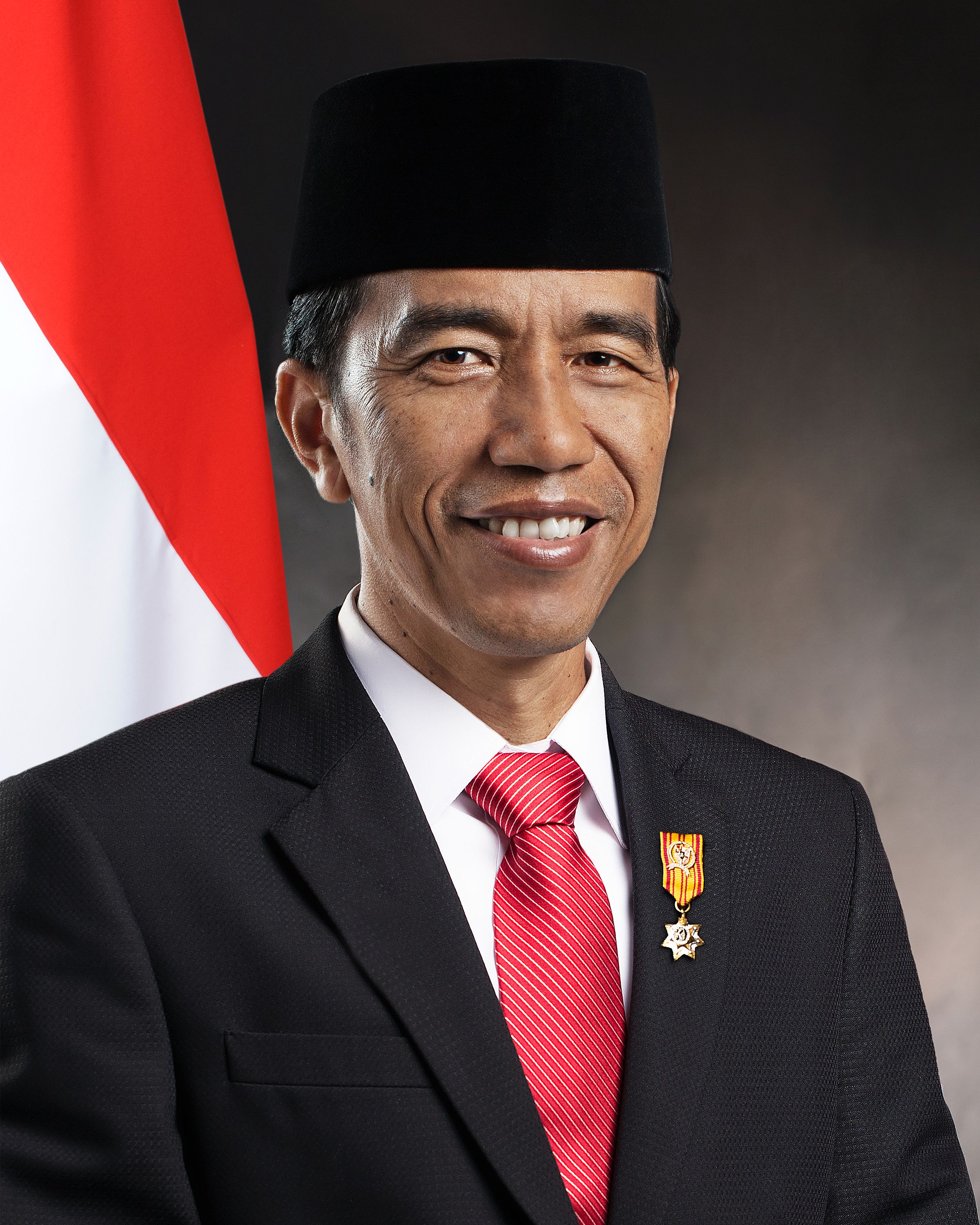
(Indonesia) Indonesia
Joko Widodo
President

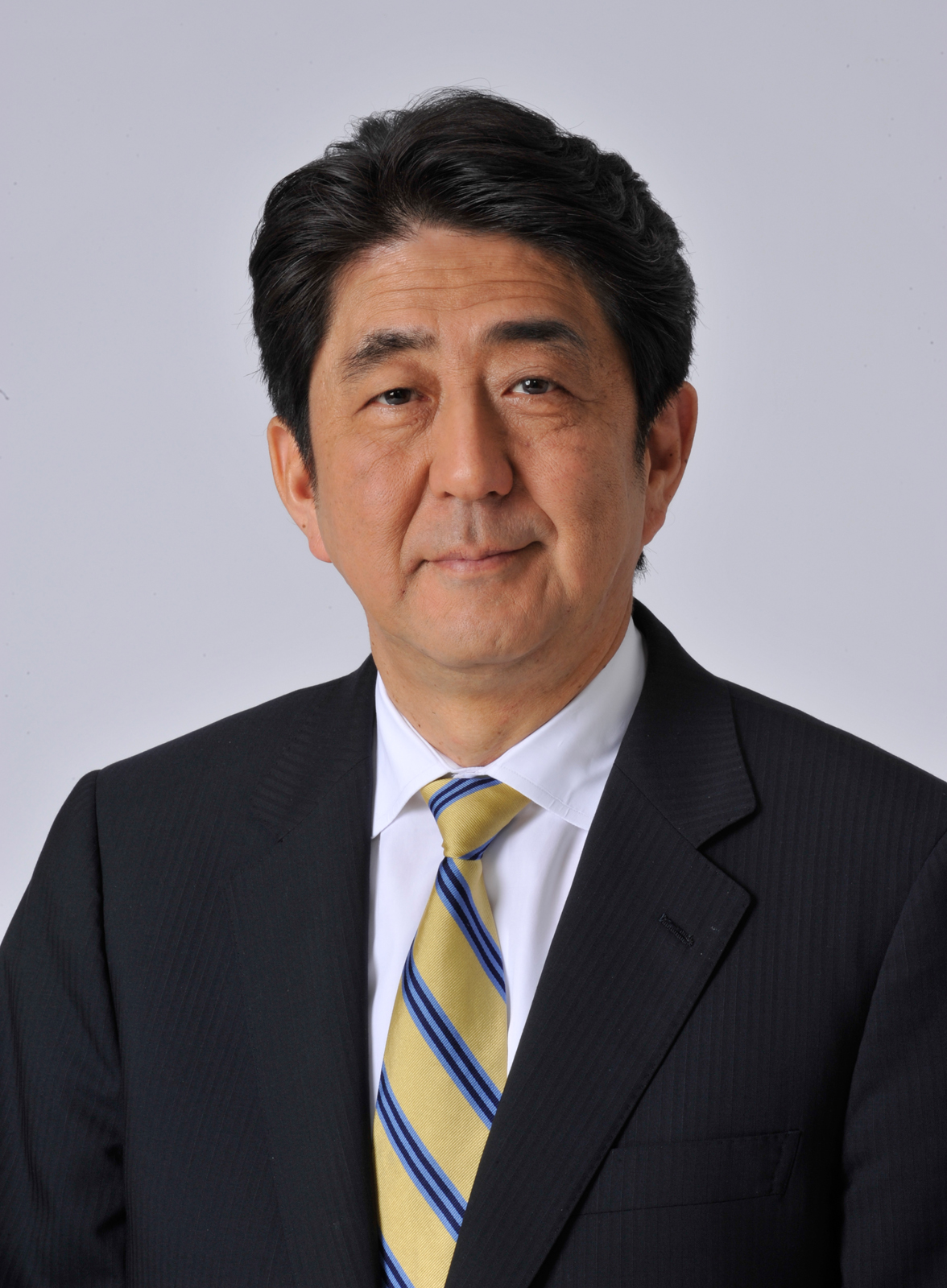
(Japan) Japan
Shinzō Abe
Prime Minister

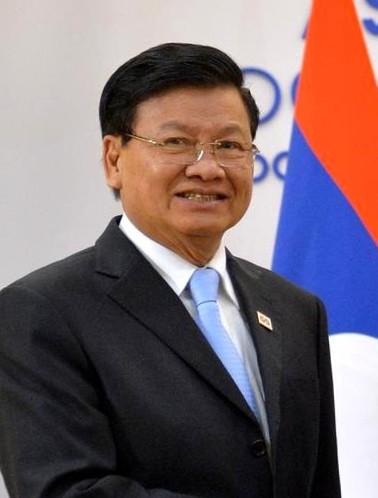
(Laos) Laos
Thongloun Sisoulith
Prime Minister
(Chairperson)

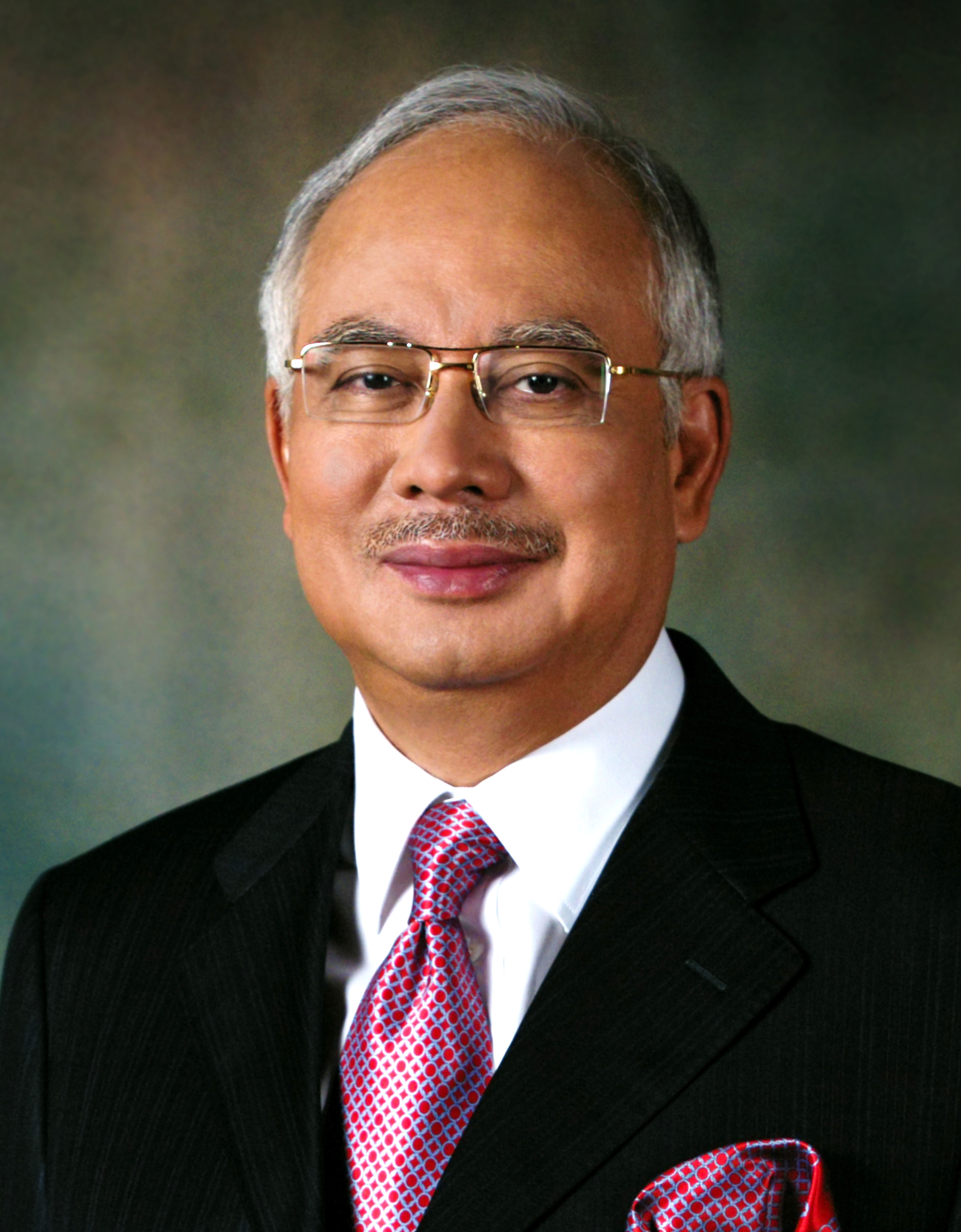
(Malaysia) Malaysia
Najib Razak
Prime Minister

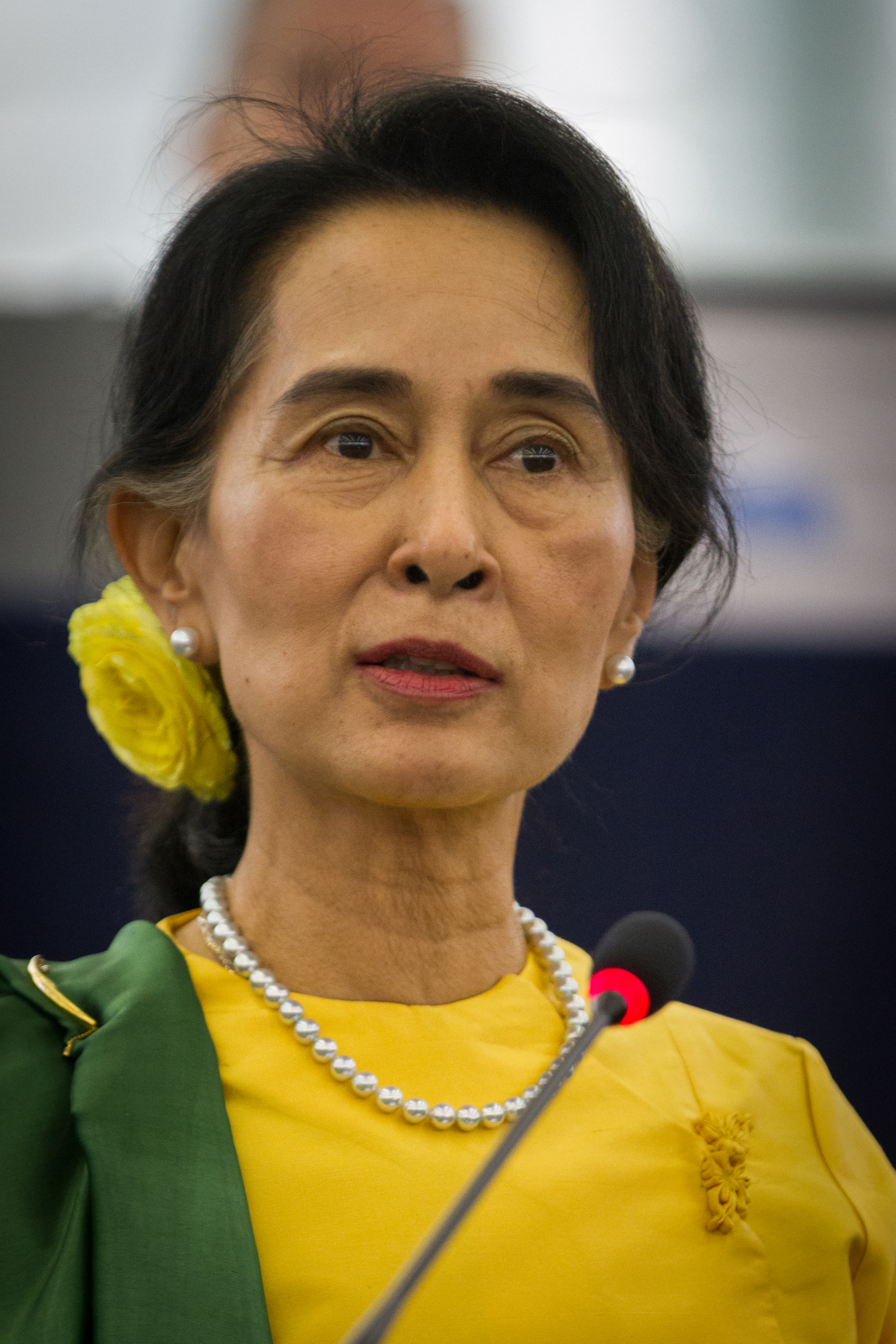
(Myanmar) Myanmar
Aung San Suu Kyi
State Counsellor

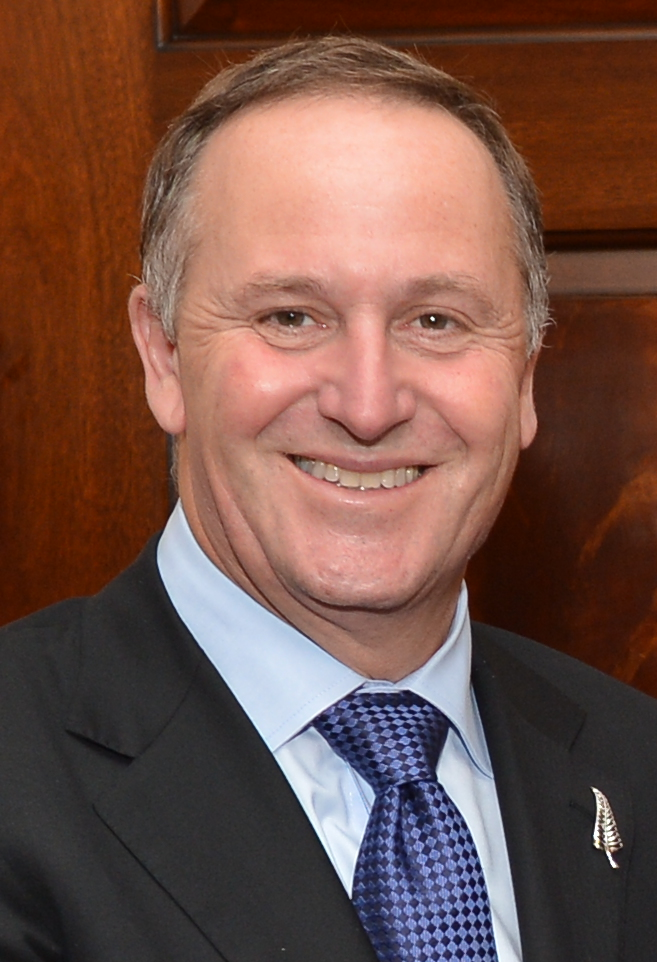
(New Zealand) New Zealand
John Key
Prime Minister

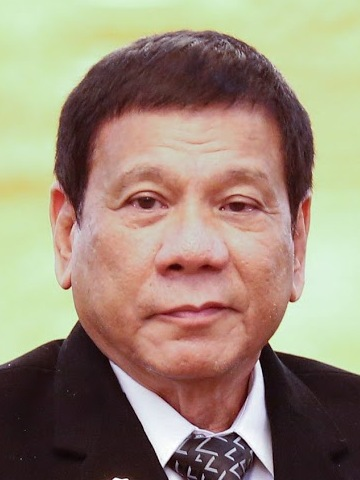
(Philippines) Philippines
Rodrigo Duterte
President

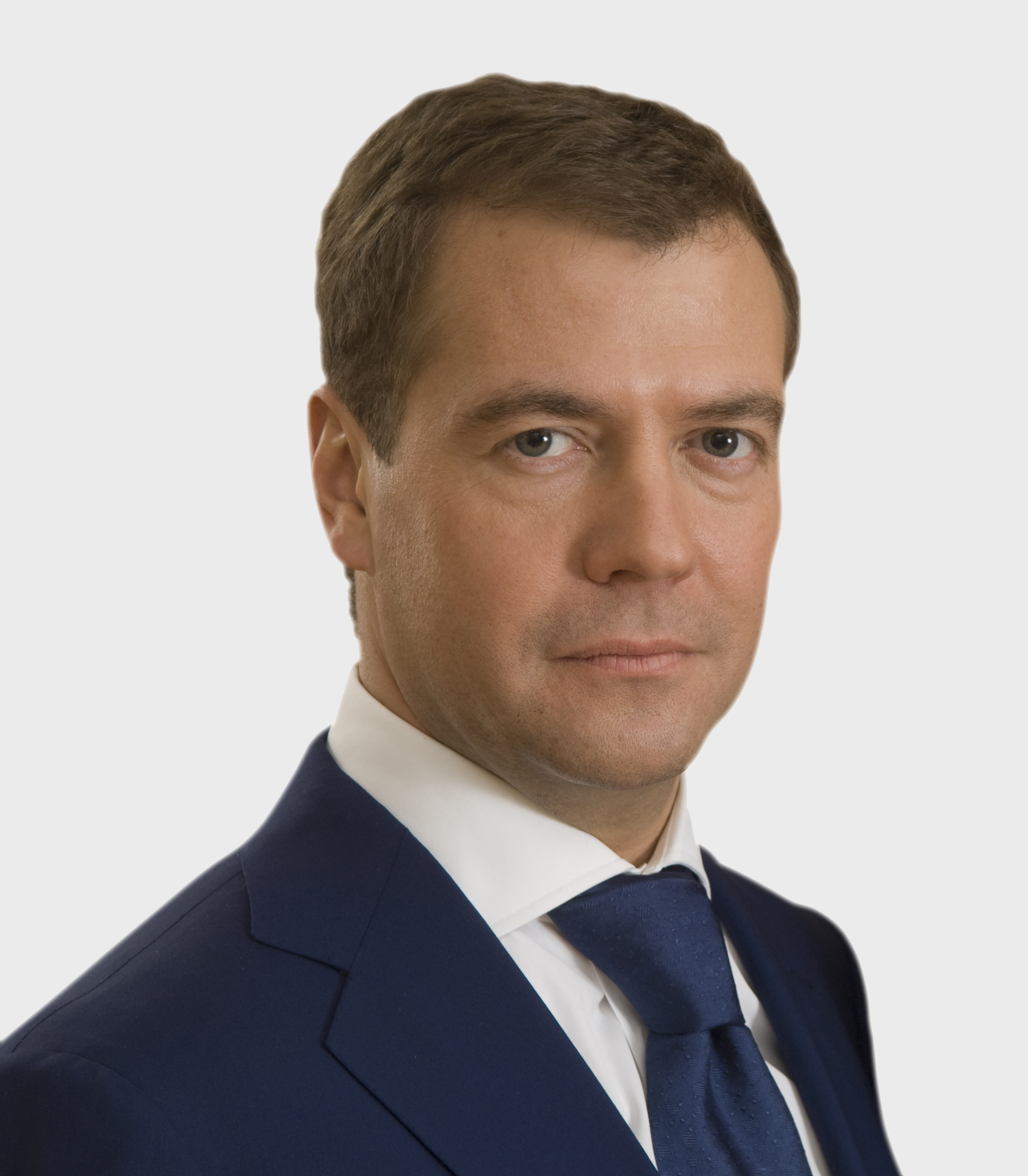
(Russia) Russia
Dmitry Medvedev
Prime Minister

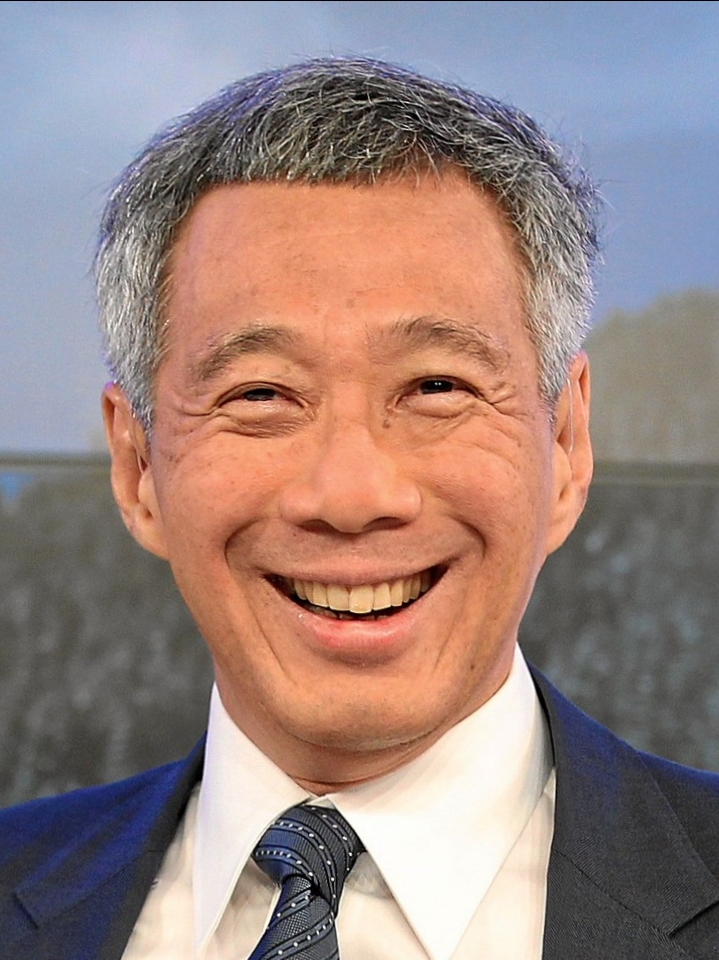
(Singapore) Singapore
Lee Hsien Loong
Prime Minister

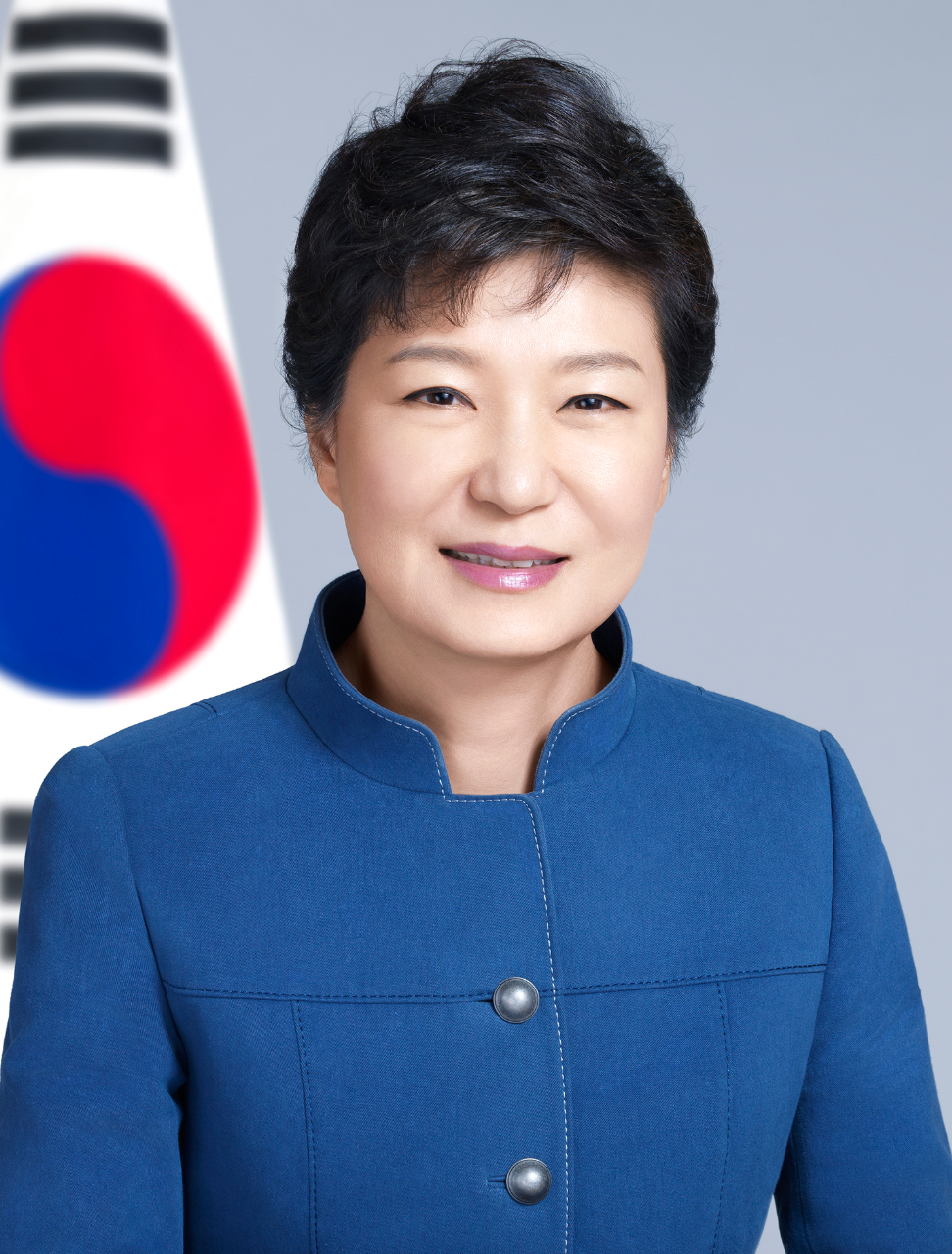
South Korea
Park Geun-hye
President

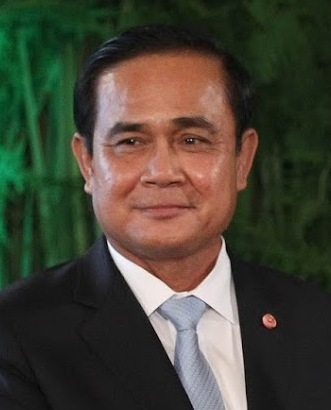
(Thailand) Thailand
Prayut Chan-o-cha
Prime Minister

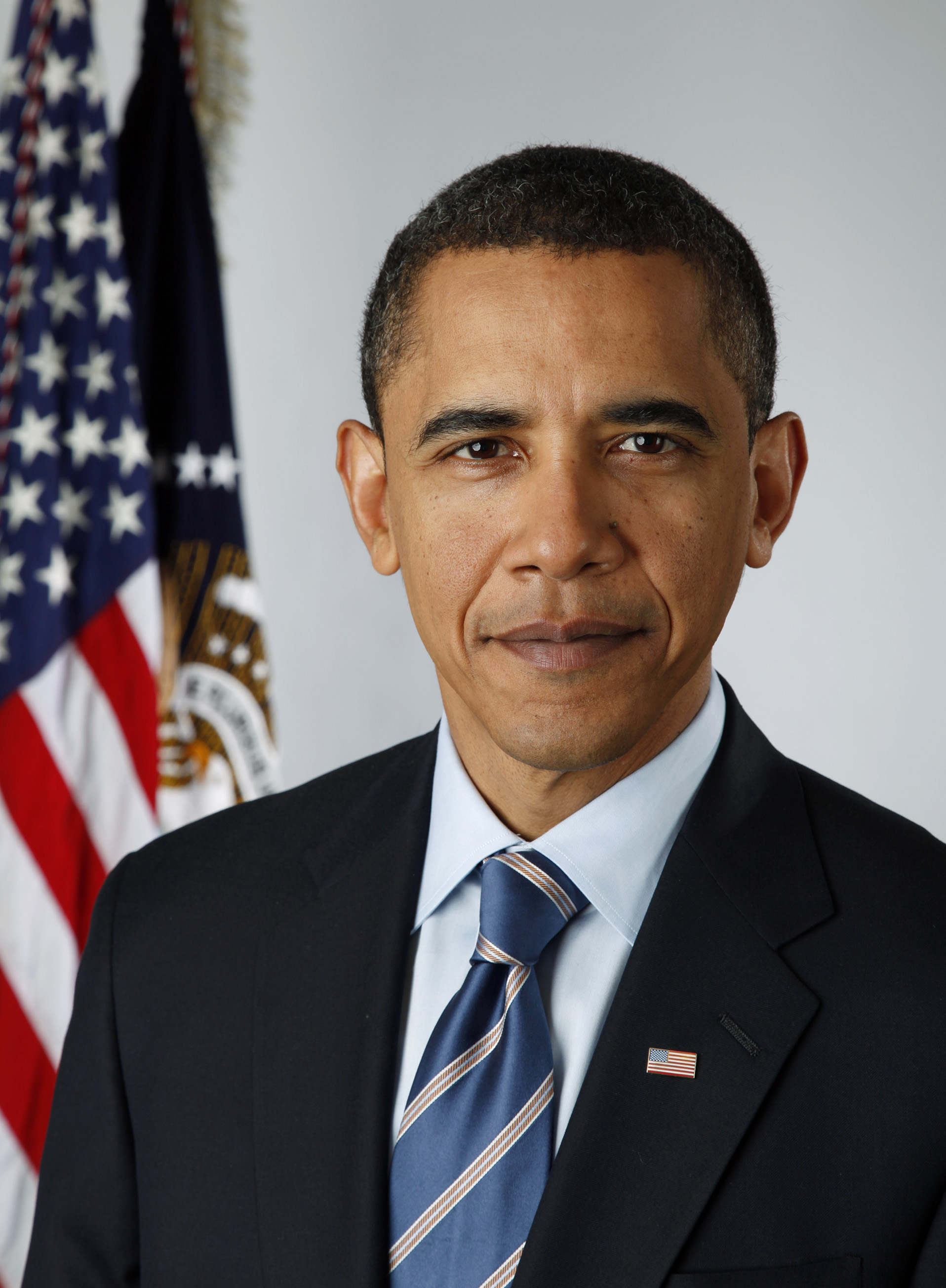
(United States) United States
Barack Obama
President

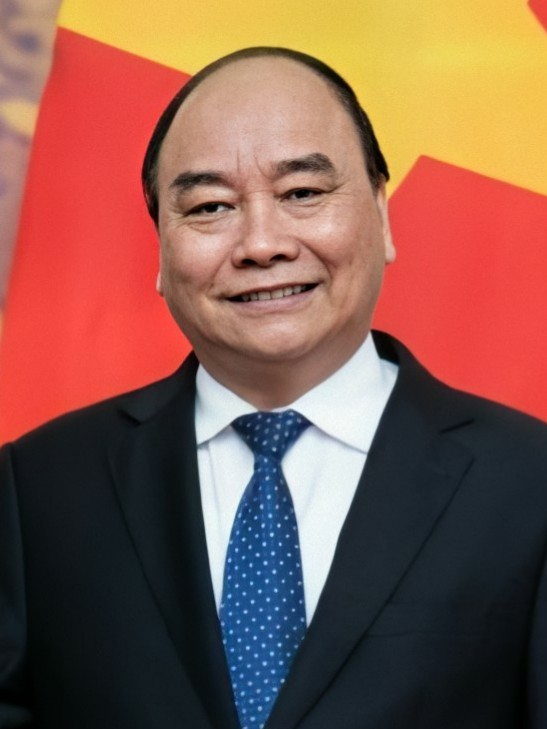
(Vietnam) Vietnam
Nguyễn Xuân Phúc
Prime Minister
