= Twelfth East Asia Summit =

Annual meeting of national leaders

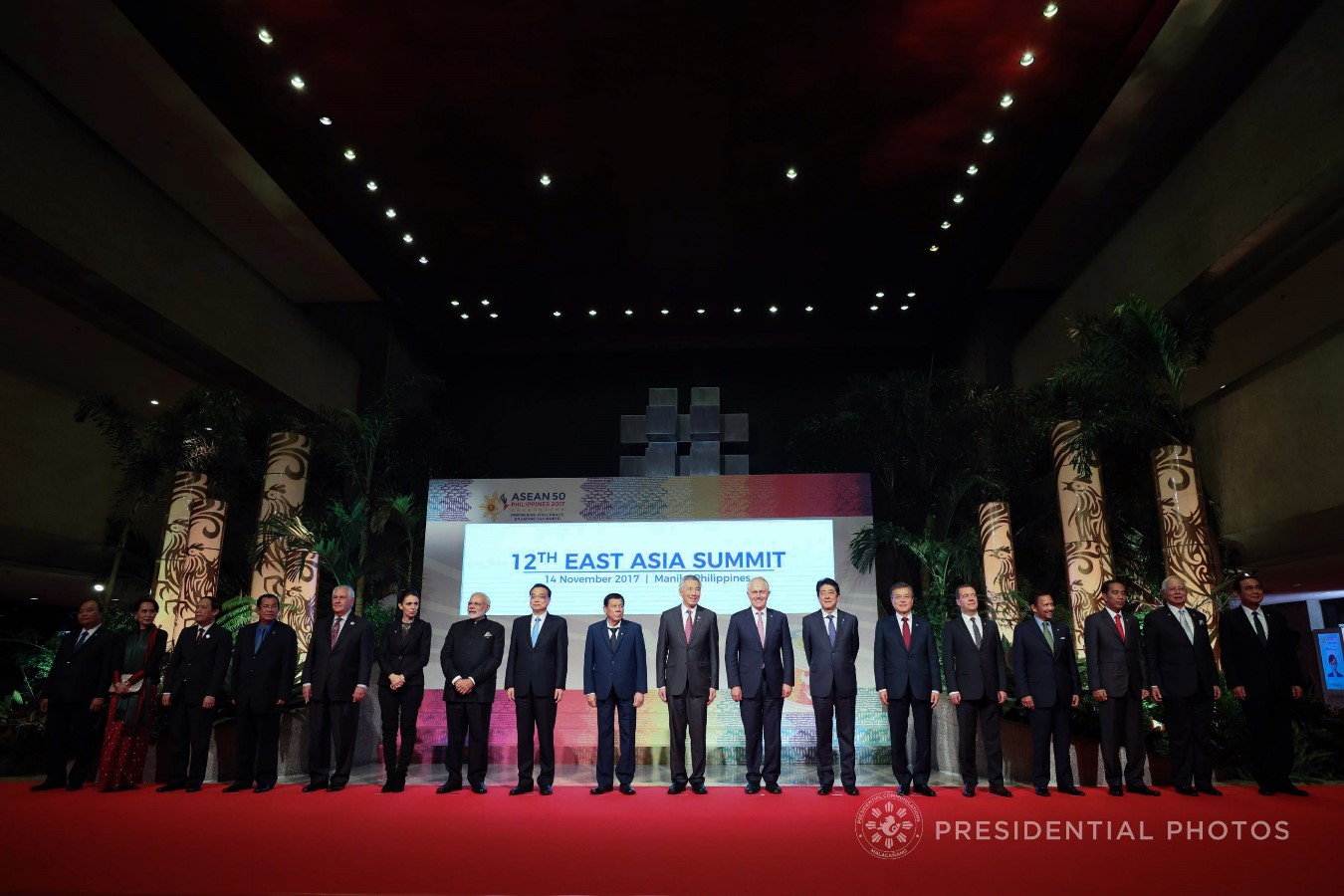
- Host country: Philippines
- Date: November 13–14, 2017
- Cities: Pasay
- Venues: Philippine International Convention Center
- Participants: EAS members
- Follows: Eleventh East Asia Summit
- Precedes: Thirteenth East Asia Summit

The Twelfth East Asia Summit was held in Pasay, Metro Manila, Philippines on November 13–14, 2017. The East Asia Summit is an annual meeting of national leaders from the East Asian region and adjoining countries.

== Attending delegations ==
The heads of state and heads of government of the eighteen countries participated in the summit. A total of 14 of the 21 attendees had attended the 2017 APEC Economic Leaders' Meeting in Đà Nẵng, Vietnam just two days prior (November 11), including the host of the summit, Philippine President Rodrigo Duterte. Meanwhile, all of the attendees, except for one, had attended the related 31st ASEAN Summit in the same venue the day prior.

U.S. President Donald Trump initially planned to attend the summit, having already entered the venue, the Philippine International Convention Center, but left before the group photo due to a two-hour delay. Secretary of State Rex Tillerson attended in President Trump's place.

=== Gallery ===
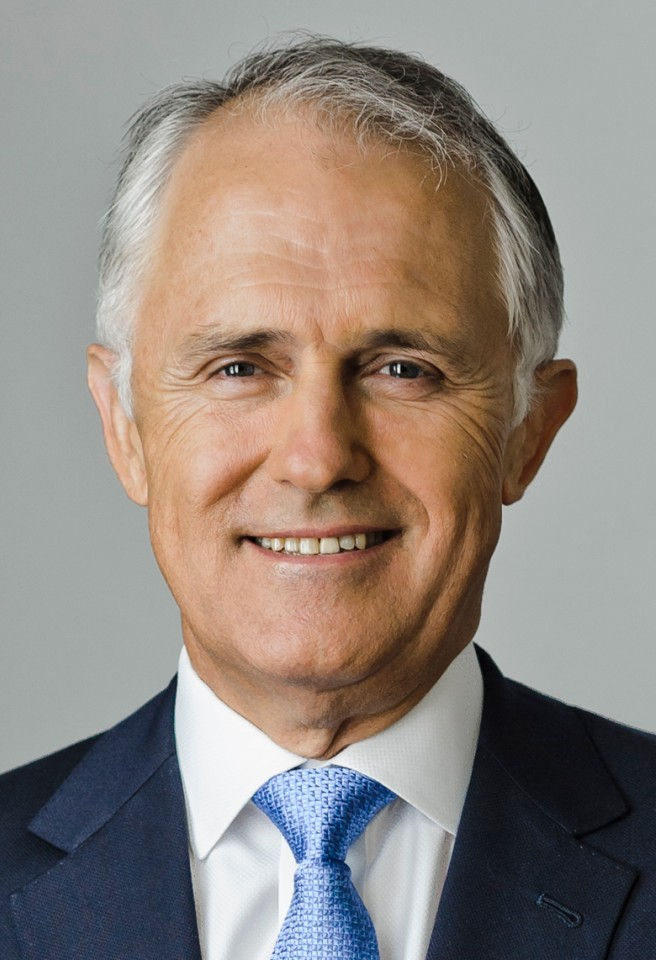
Australia
Prime Minister Malcolm Turnbull

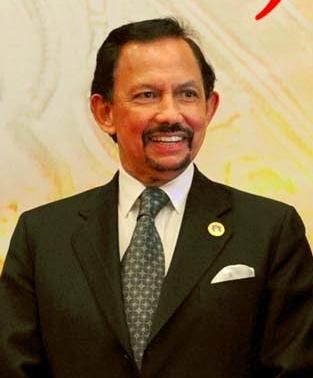
Brunei
Sultan Hassanal Bolkiah

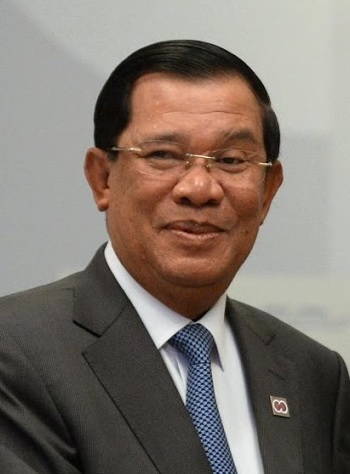
Cambodia
Prime Minister Hun Sen

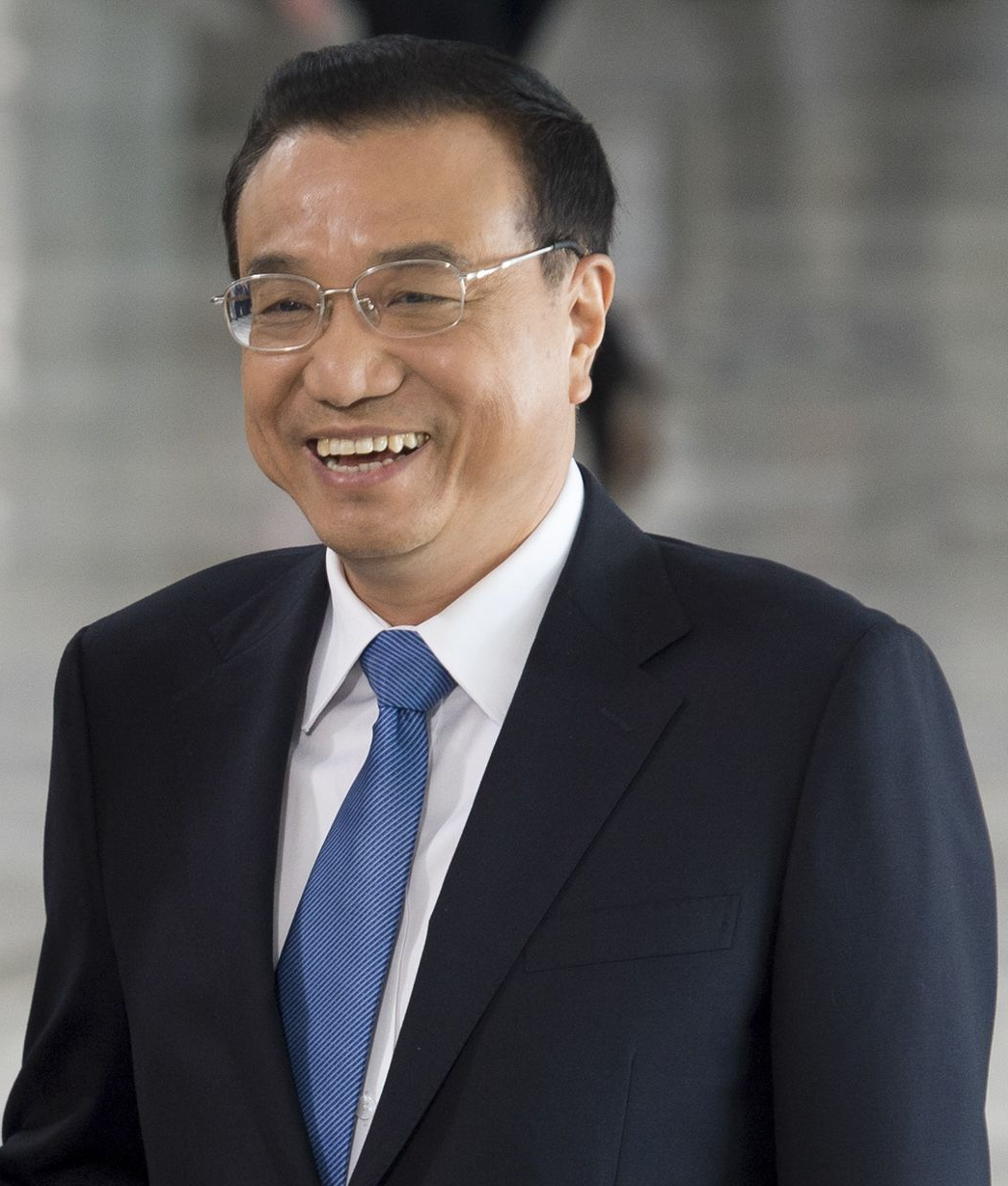
(China) China
Premier Li Keqiang

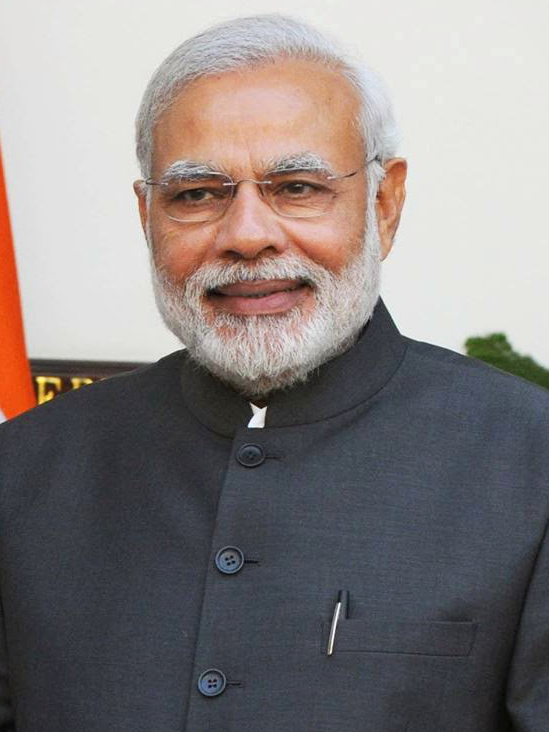
(India) India
Prime Minister Narendra Modi

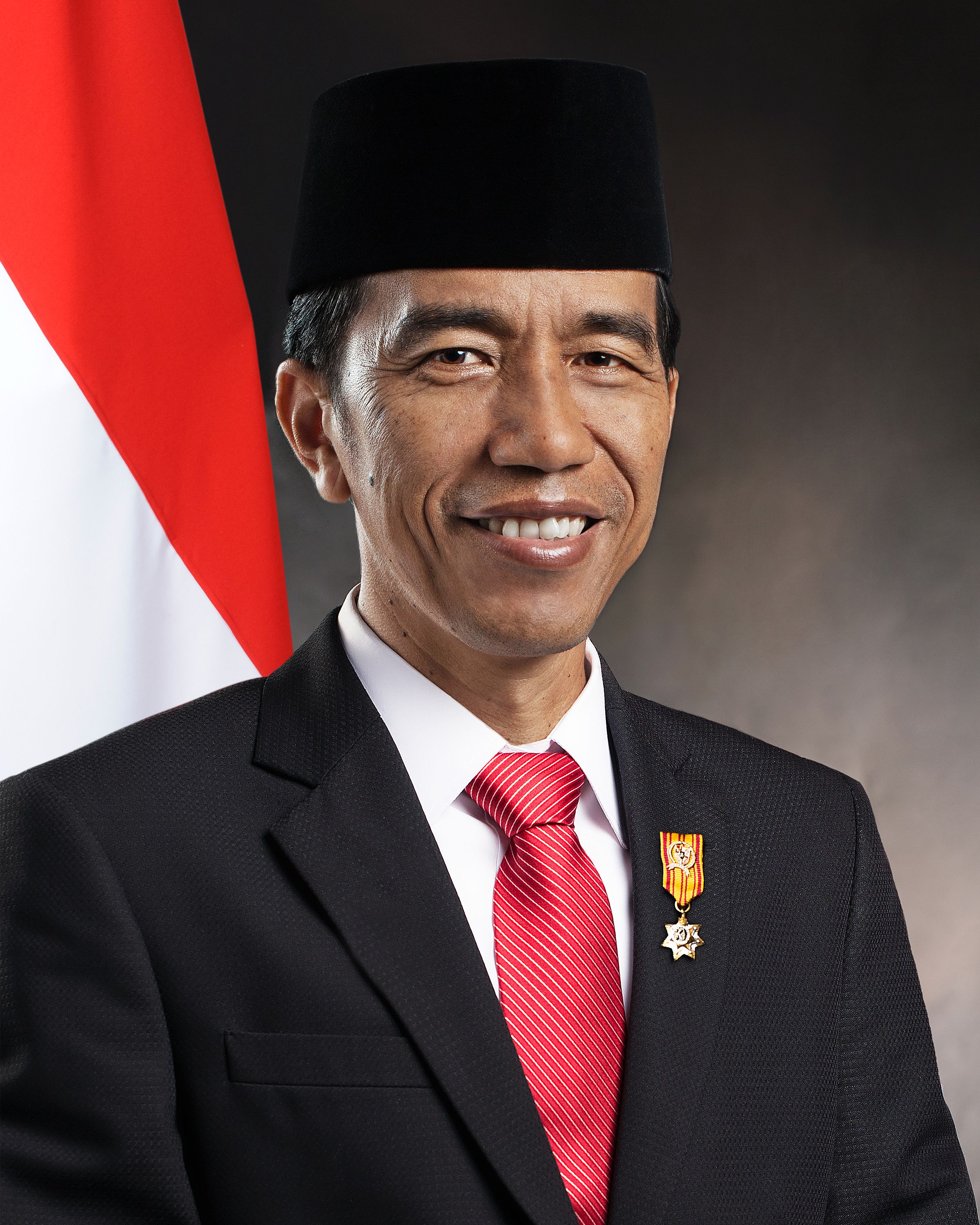
(Indonesia) Indonesia
President Joko Widodo

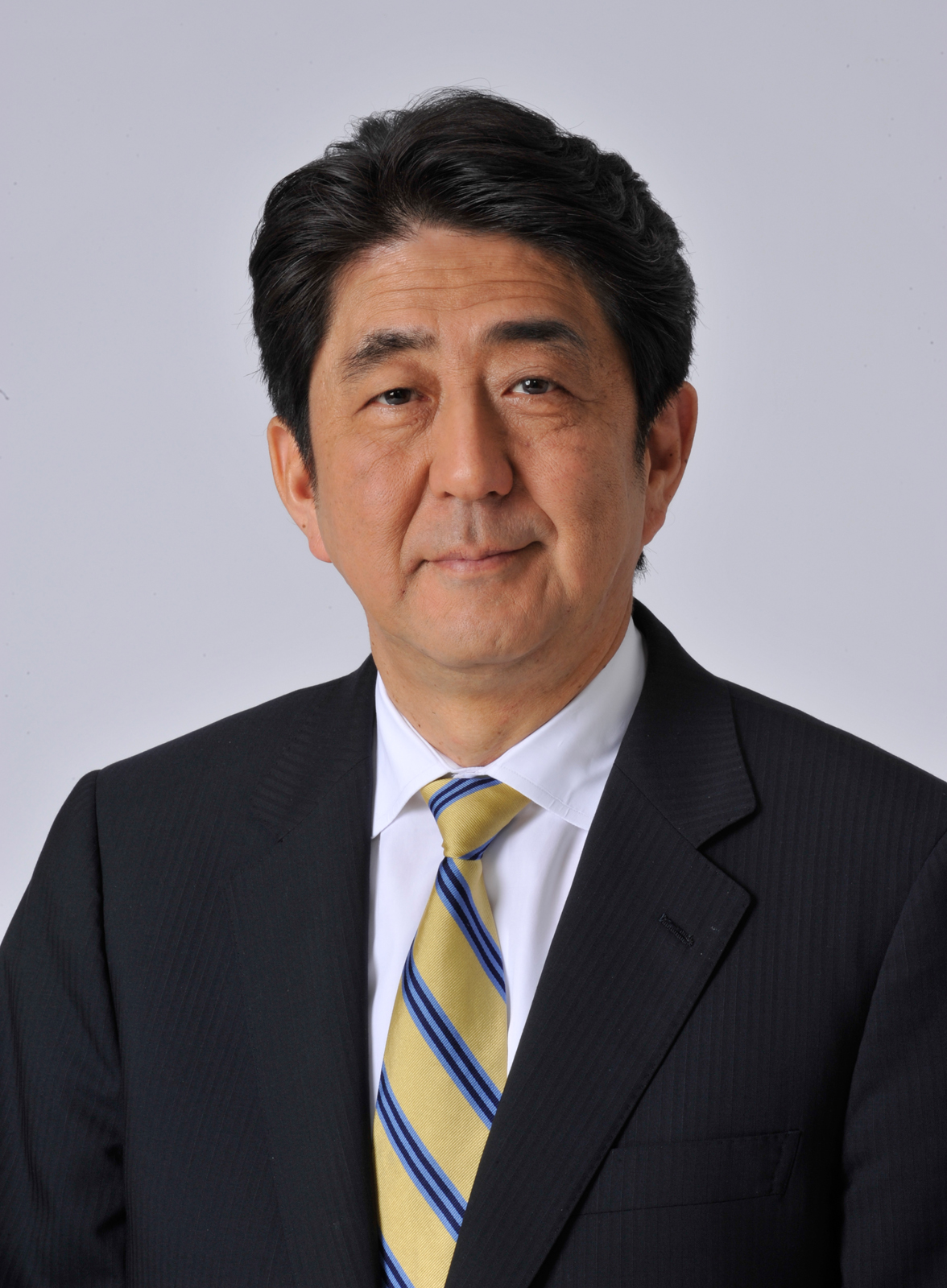
(Japan) Japan
Prime Minister Shinzō Abe

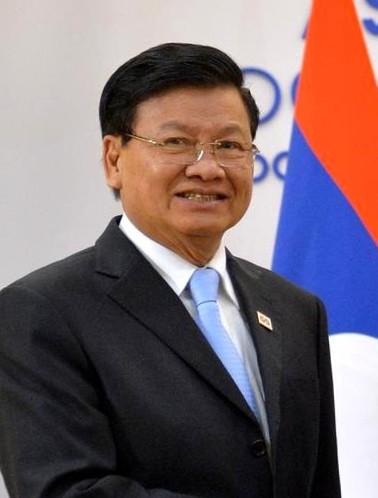
(Laos) Laos
Prime Minister Thongloun Sisoulith

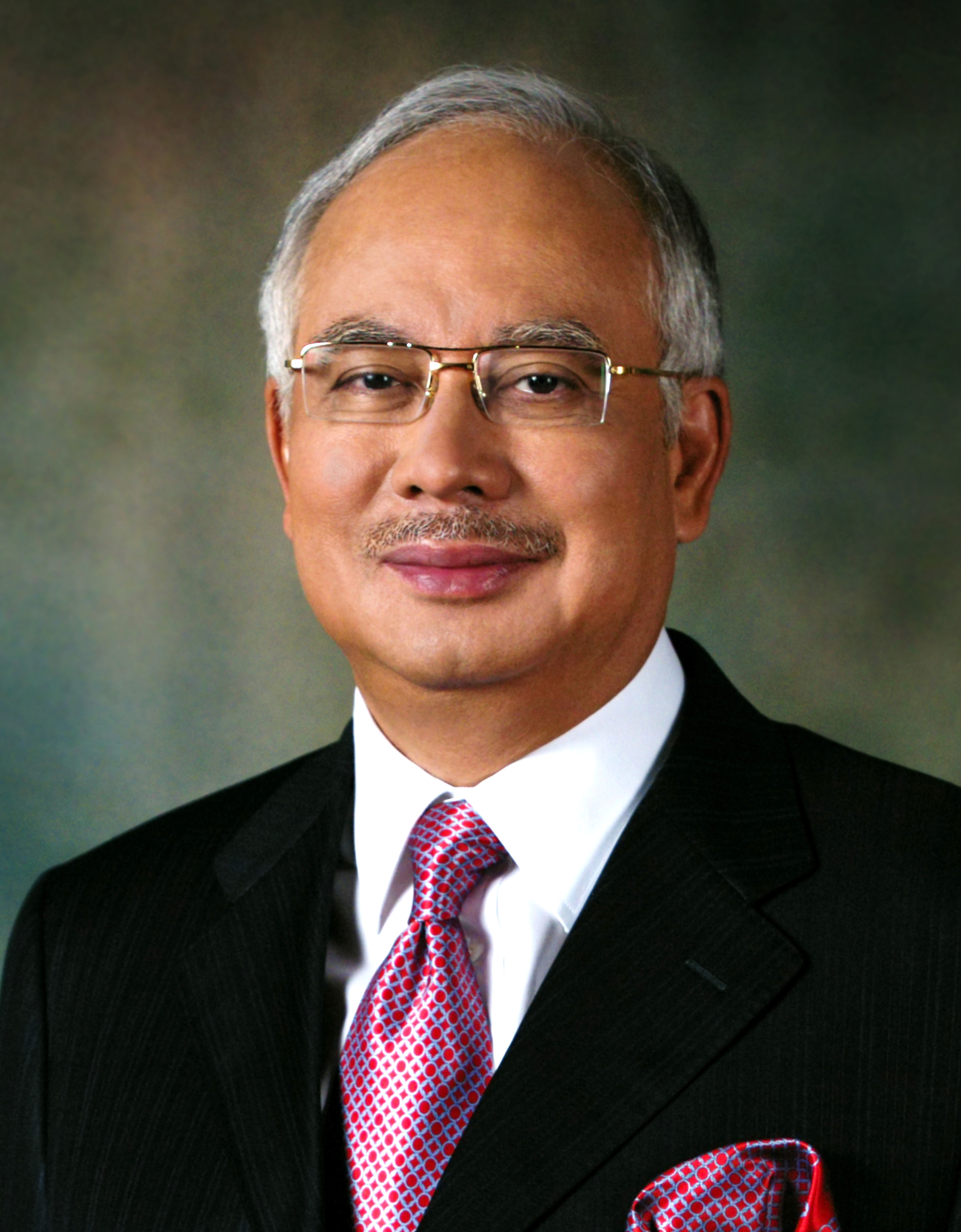
(Malaysia) Malaysia
Prime Minister Najib Razak

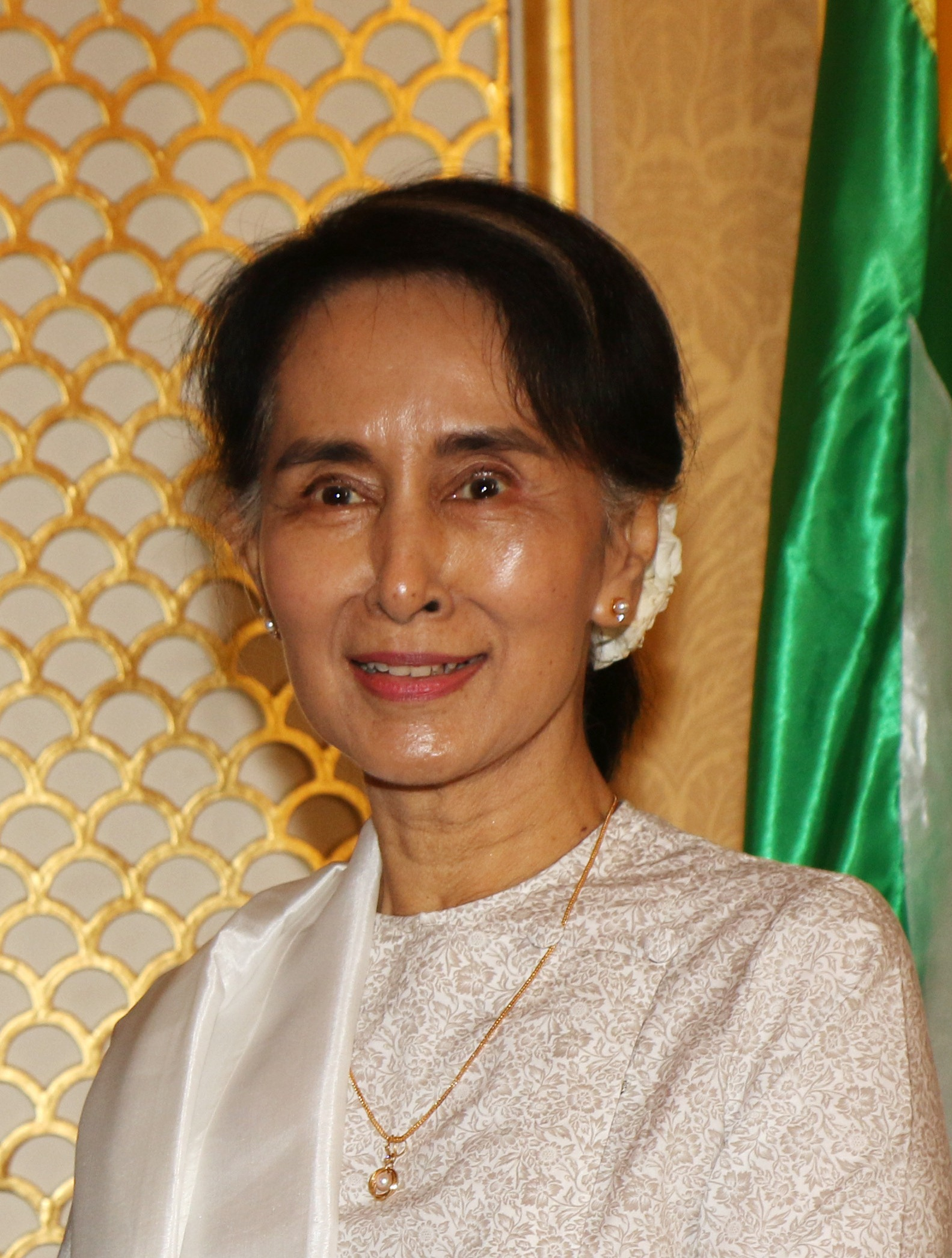
Myanmar
State Counsellor Aung San Suu Kyi

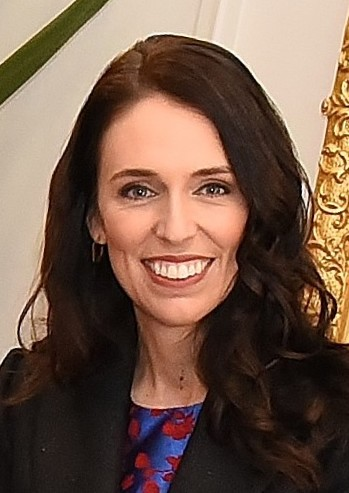
(New Zealand) New Zealand
Prime Minister Jacinda Ardern

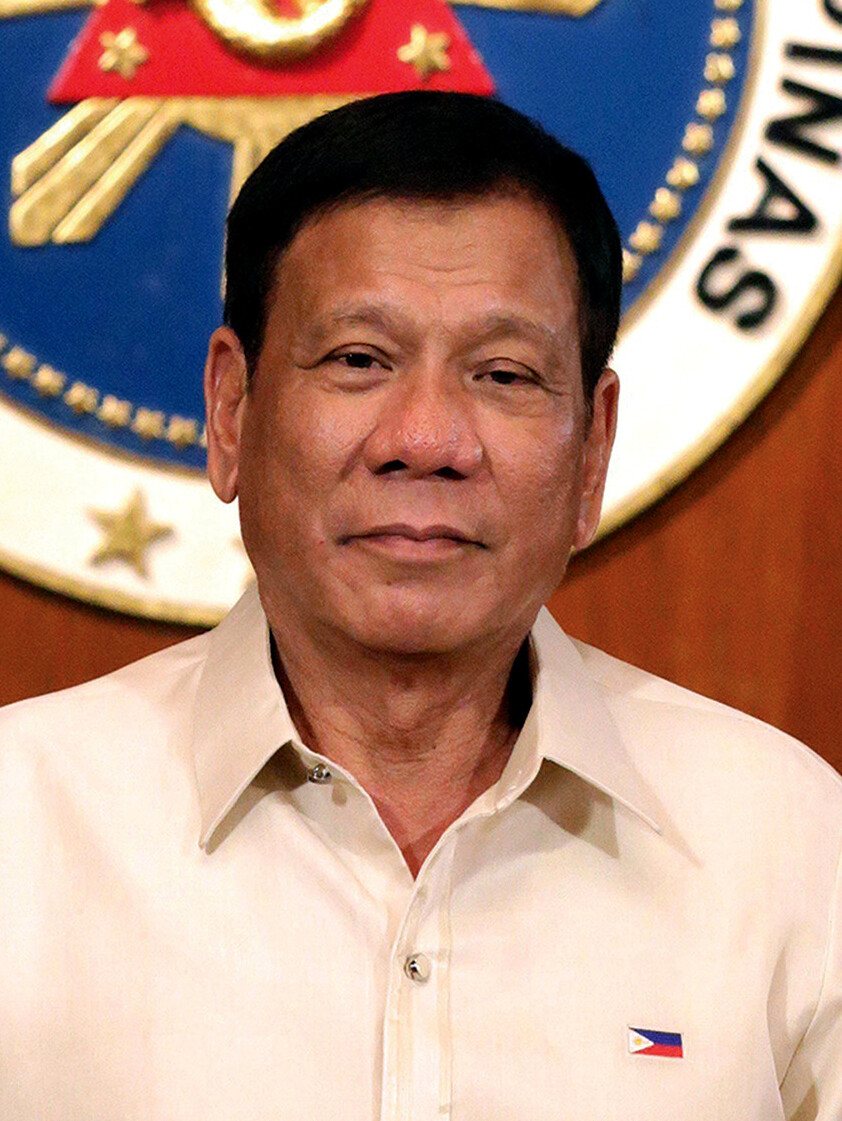
(Philippines) Philippines
President Rodrigo Duterte (Chairperson)

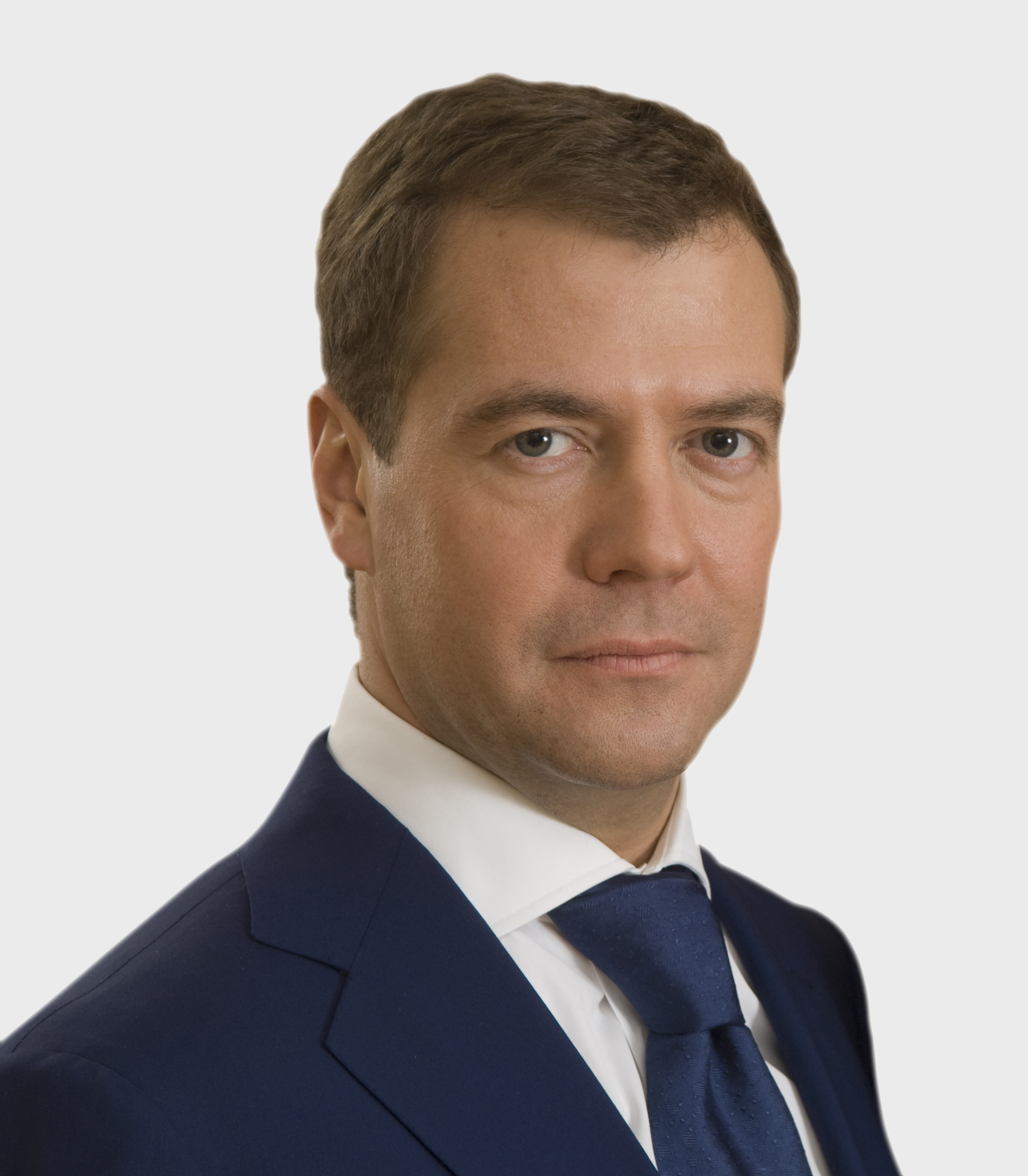
(Russia) Russia
Prime Minister Dmitry Medvedev

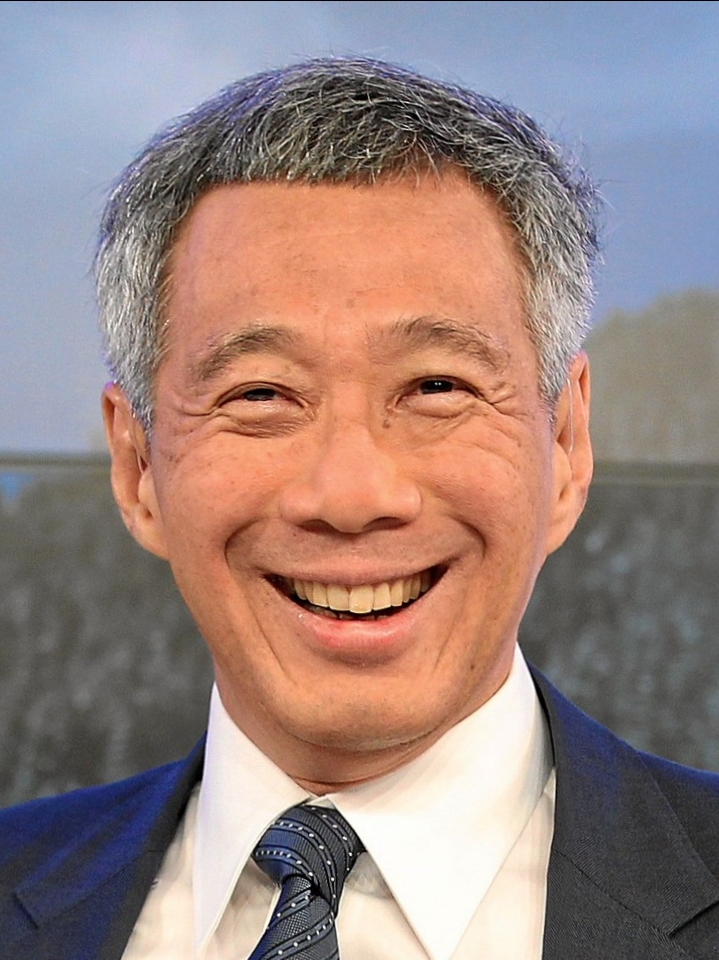
(Singapore) Singapore
Prime Minister Lee Hsien Loong

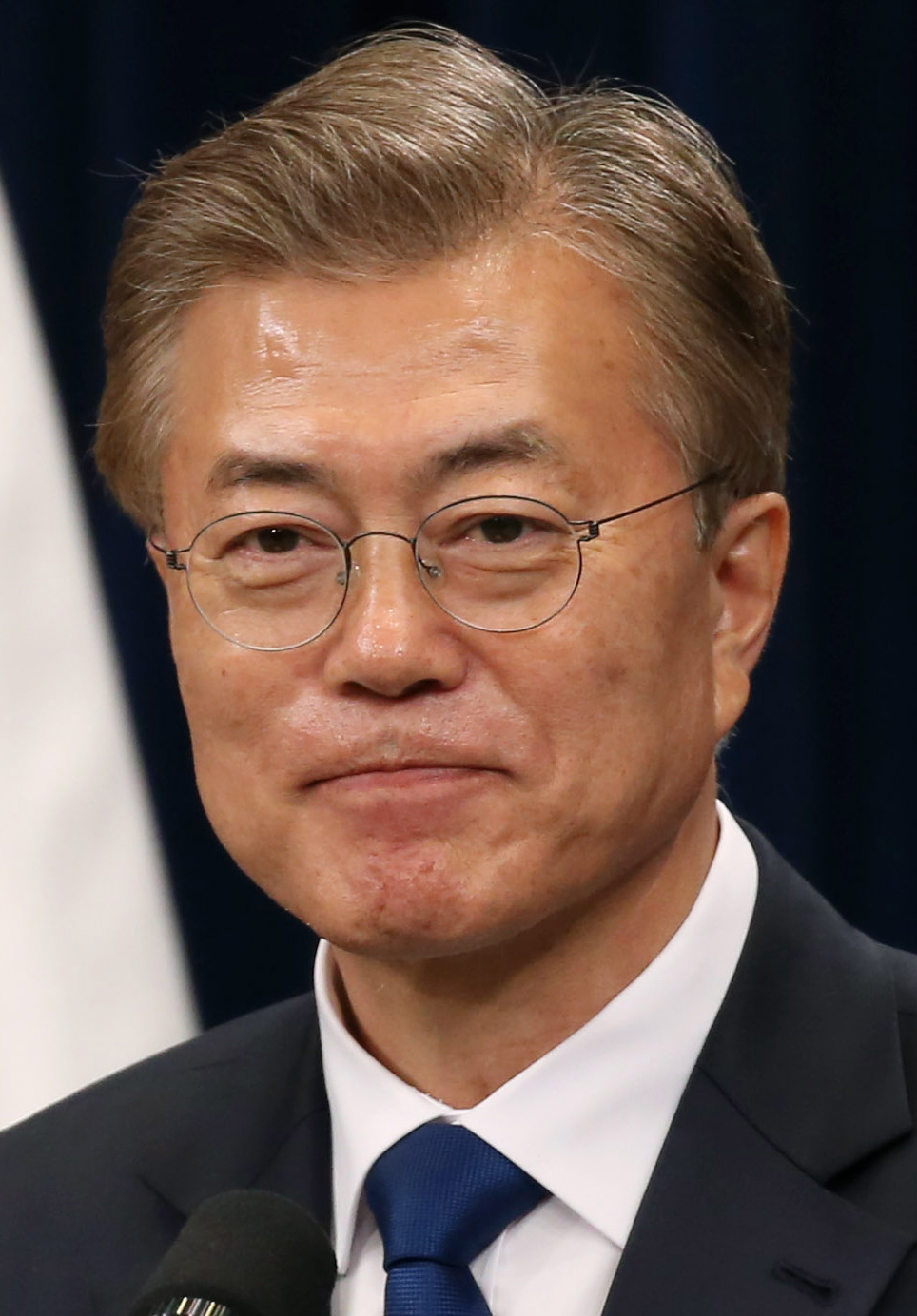
(South Korea) South Korea
President Moon Jae-in

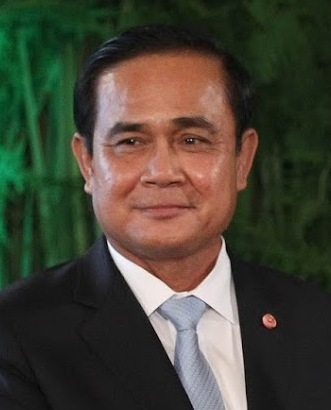
(Thailand) Thailand
Prime Minister Prayuth Chan-ocha

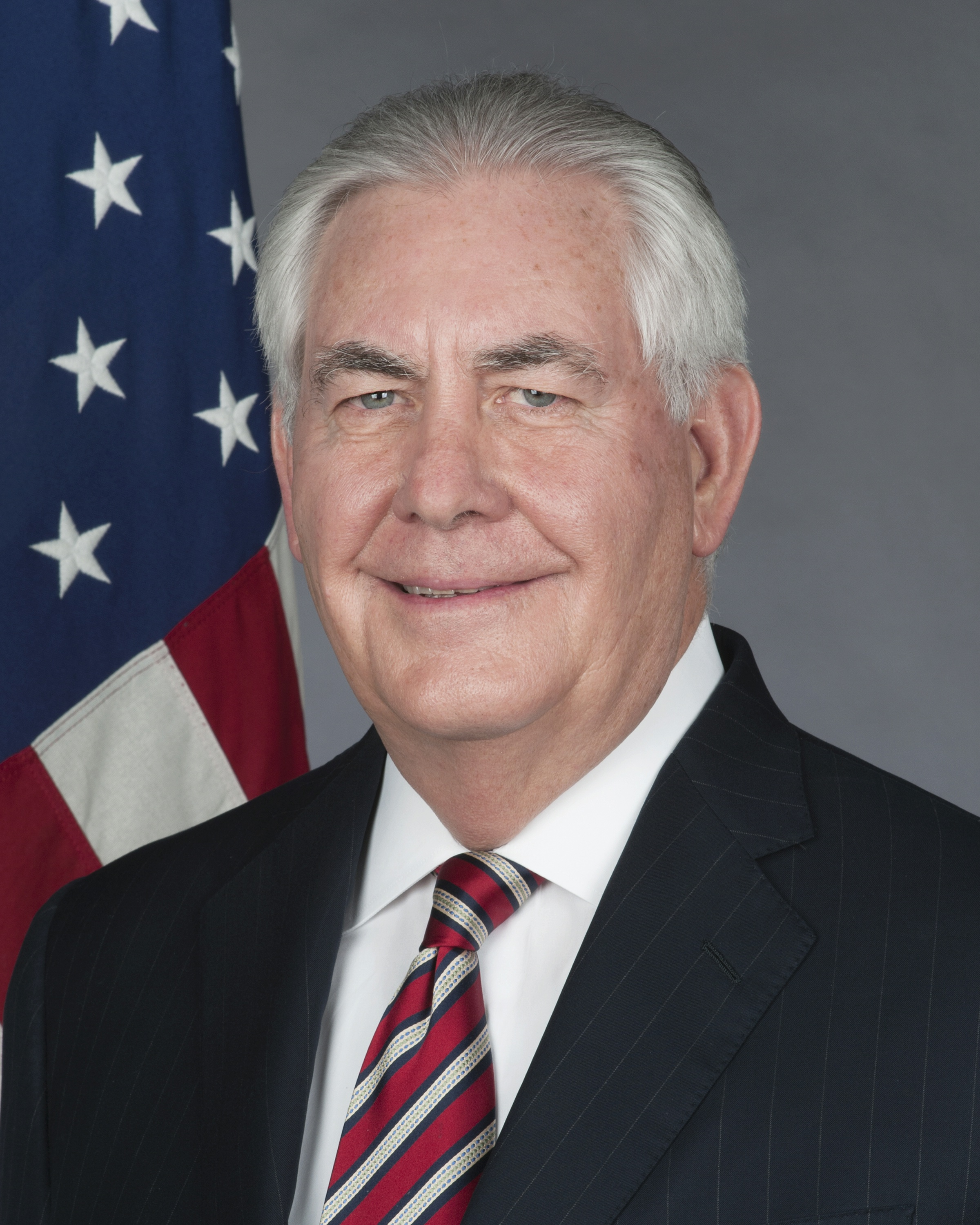
(United States) United States
Secretary of State Rex Tillerson

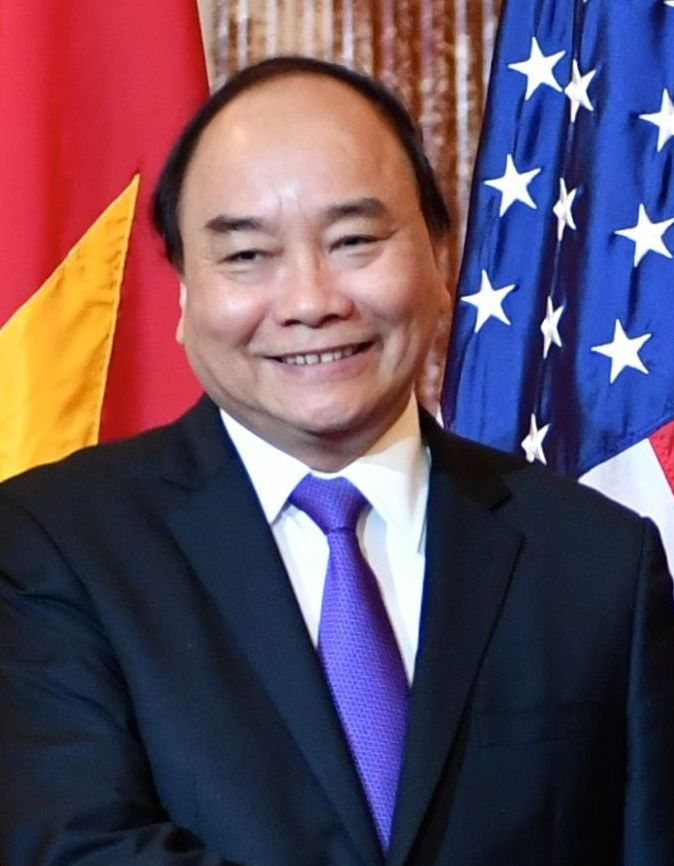
(Vietnam) Vietnam
Prime Minister Nguyen Xuan Phuc

=== Guest invitees ===
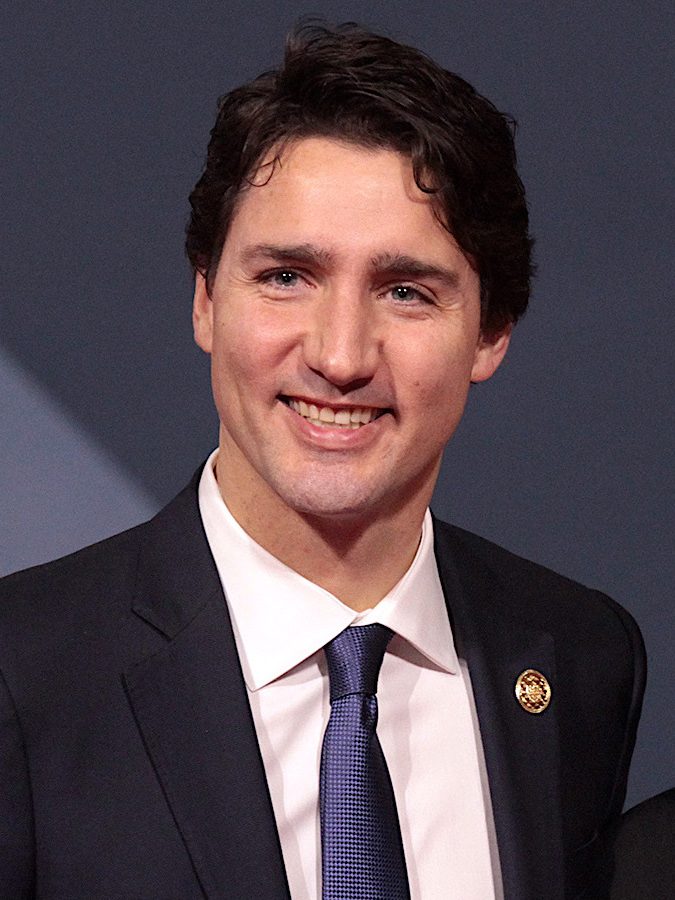
(Canada) Canada
Prime Minister Justin Trudeau

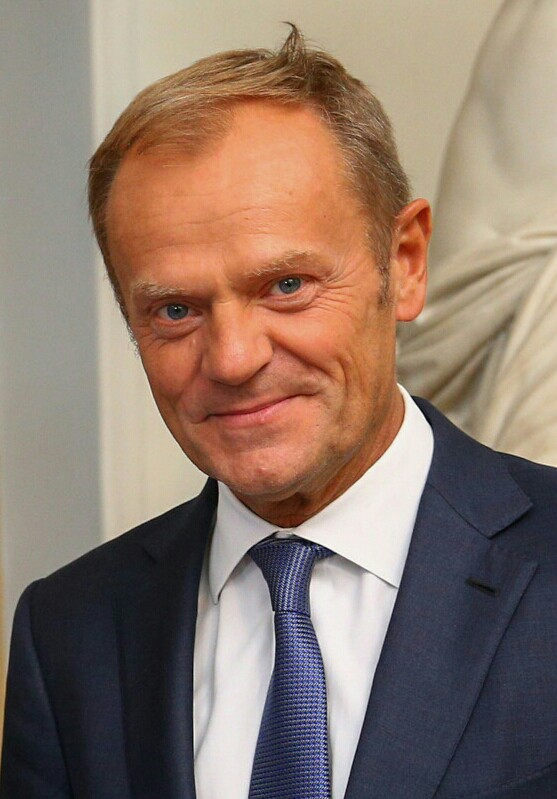
(European Union) European Union
President Donald Tusk

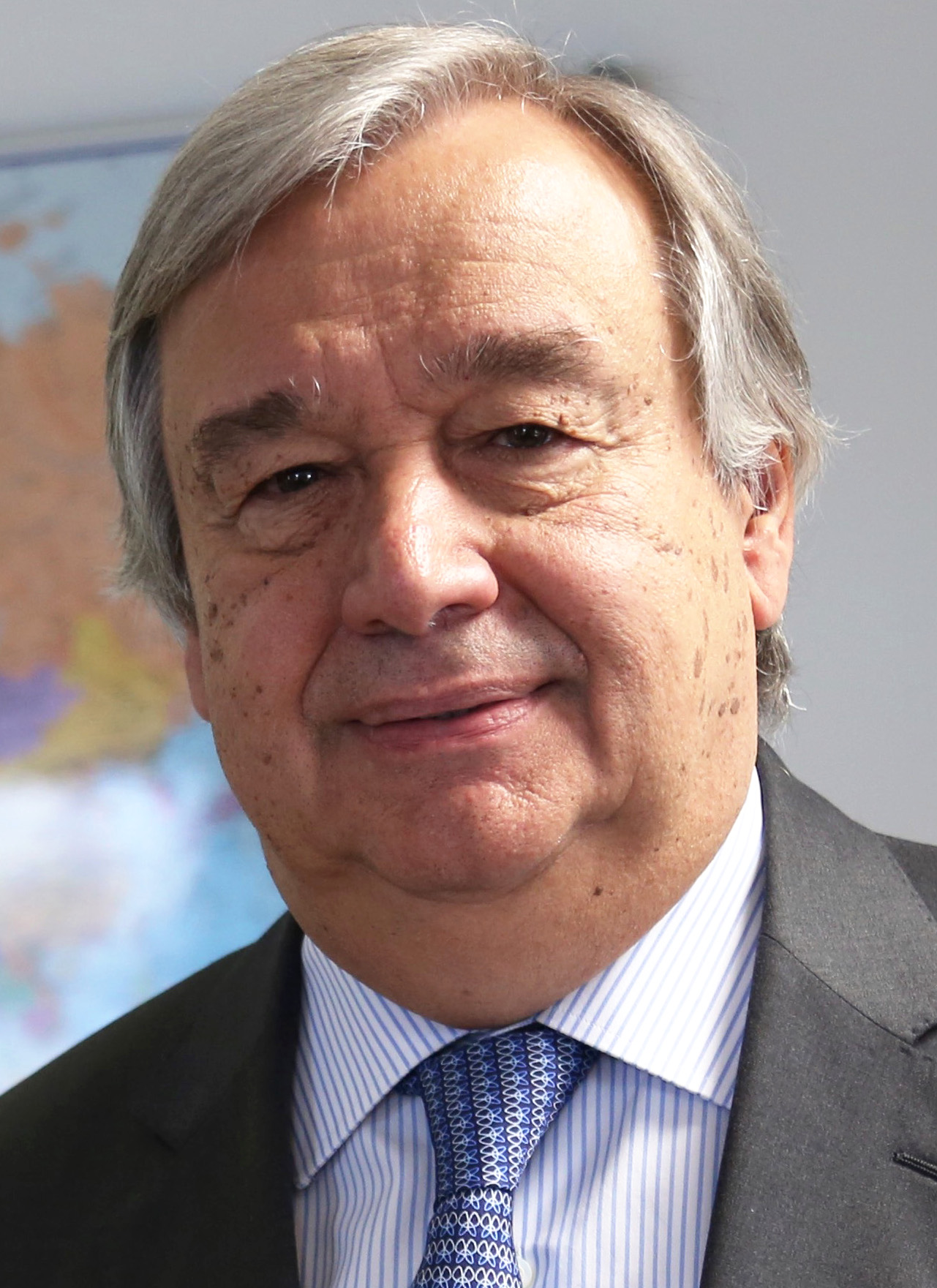
(United Nations) United Nations
Secretary-General António Guterres
