= List of international trips made by prime ministers of Japan =

The following is a list of international prime ministerial trips made by prime ministers of Japan in chronological order since the start of Premiership of Junichiro Koizumi in 2001.

== Summary ==
As of 20 November 2026, the number of visits per country/territory where Prime Ministers have travelled since the start of the premiership of Junichiro Koizumi in 2001 are:

- One visit to: Bahrain, Bangladesh, Bulgaria, Colombia, Cuba, Djibouti, Estonia, Greece, Iran, Ireland, Ivory Coast, Jamaica, Kyrgyzstan, Latvia, Malta, Pakistan, Portugal, Romania, Serbia, Slovakia, Sri Lanka, Tajikistan, Timor-Leste, Trinidad and Tobago, Turkmenistan and Uruguay
- Two visits to: Argentina, Brunei, Chile, Czech Republic, Denmark, Ethiopia, Finland, Ghana, Kazakhstan, Kenya, Kuwait, Lithuania, Luxembourg, Mozambique, Myanmar, New Zealand, North Korea, Oman, Papua New Guinea, Paraguay, Sweden, Ukraine, Uzbekistan and Vatican City
- Three visits to: Egypt, Israel, Jordan, Netherlands, Palestine, Peru, Qatar and South Africa
- Four visits to: Mexico, Mongolia, Poland, Spain and Turkey
- Five visits to: Cambodia, Laos and Saudi Arabia
- Six visits to: Brazil, Switzerland and the United Arab Emirates
- Seven visits to: Australia
- Eight visits to: Canada, Malaysia and Thailand
- Ten visits to: the Philippines, Singapore and Vietnam
- Eleven visits to: India
- Twelve visits to: Germany and Italy
- Thirteen visits to: Indonesia
- Fourteen visits to: Belgium
- Fifteen visits to: France and Russia
- Sixteen visits to: China and the United Kingdom
- Twenty-one visits to: South Korea
- Forty-nine visits to: the United States

Countries/Territories	International trips made by											
Countries/Territories	Junichiro Koizumi (2001–2006)	Shinzo Abe (2006–2007, 2012–2020)	Yasuo Fukuda (2007–2008)	Tarō Asō (2008–2009)	Yukio Hatoyama (2009–2010)	Naoto Kan (2010–2011)	Yoshihiko Noda (2011–2012)	Yoshihide Suga (2020–2021)	Fumio Kishida (2021–2024)	Shigeru Ishiba (2024–2025)	Sanae Takaichi (Since 2025)	Total (Since 2001)
Argentina	none	2 (2016, 2018)	none	none	none	none	none	none	none	none	none	2 (2016, 2018)
Australia	1 (2002)	4 (2007, 2014, 2017, 2018)	none	none	none	none	none	none	1 (2022)	none	1 (2026)	7 (2002, 2007, 2014, 2017, 2018, 2022, 2026)
Bahrain	none	1 (2013)	none	none	none	none	none	none	none	none	none	1 (2013)
Bangladesh	none	1 (2014)	none	none	none	none	none	none	none	none	none	1 (2014)
Belgium	1 (2001)	9 (2007, 2014, 2016, 2017, 2018, 2019)	none	none	none	2 (2010, 2011)	none	none	2 (2022, 2023)	none	none	14 (2001, 2007, 2010, 2011, 2014, 2016, 2017, 2018, 2019, 2022, 2023)
Brazil	1 (2004)	2 (2014, 2016)	none	none	none	none	none	none	2 (2024)	1 (2024)	none	6 (2004, 2014, 2016, 2024)
Brunei	1 (2001)	1 (2013)	none	none	none	none	none	none	none	none	none	2 (2001, 2013)
Bulgaria	none	1 (2018)	none	none	none	none	none	none	none	none	none	1 (2018)
Cambodia	1 (2002)	1 (2013)	none	none	none	none	1 (2012)	none	2 (2022)	none	none	5 (2002, 2012, 2013, 2022)
Canada	2 (2002, 2006)	3 (2013, 2018, 2019)	none	none	none	1 (2010)	none	none	1 (2023)	1 (2025)	none	8 (2002, 2006, 2010, 2013, 2018, 2019, 2023, 2025)
Chile	1 (2004)	1 (2014)	none	none	none	none	none	none	none	none	none	2 (2004, 2014)
China	3 (2001, 2002)	5 (2006, 2014, 2016, 2018, 2019)	2 (2007, 2008)	2 (2008, 2009)	1 (2009)	none	2 (2011, 2012)	none	none	none	1 (2026)	16 (2001, 2002, 2006, 2007, 2008, 2009, 2011, 2012, 2014, 2016, 2018, 2019, 2026)
Colombia	none	1 (2014)	none	none	none	none	none	none	none	none	none	1 (2014)
Cuba	none	1 (2016)	none	none	none	none	none	none	none	none	none	1 (2016)
Czech Republic	1 (2003)	none	none	1 (2009)	none	none	none	none	none	none	none	2 (2003, 2009)
Denmark	none	1 (2017)	none	none	1 (2009)	none	none	none	none	none	none	2 (2009, 2017)
Djibouti	none	1 (2013)	none	none	none	none	none	none	none	none	none	1 (2013)
Egypt	1 (2003)	1 (2015)	none	none	none	none	none	none	1 (2023)	none	none	3 (2003, 2015, 2023)
Estonia	none	1 (2018)	none	none	none	none	none	none	none	none	none	1 (2018)
Ethiopia	1 (2006)	1 (2014)	none	none	none	none	none	none	none	none	none	2 (2006, 2014)
Finland	1 (2006)	1 (2017)	none	none	none	none	none	none	none	none	none	2 (2006, 2017)
France	2 (2001, 2003)	8 (2007, 2014, 2015, 2016, 2017, 2018, 2019)	none	none	none	1 (2011)	1 (2011)	none	2 (2023, 2024)	none	1 (2026)	15 (2001, 2003, 2007, 2011, 2014, 2015, 2016, 2017, 2018, 2019, 2023, 2024, 2026)
Germany	2 (2003)	7 (2007, 2014, 2015, 2016)	1 (2008)	1 (2009)	none	none	none	none	1 (2022)	none	none	12 (2003, 2007, 2008, 2009, 2014, 2015, 2016, 2022)
Ghana	1 (2006)	none	none	none	none	none	none	none	1 (2023)	none	none	2 (2006, 2023)
Greece	1 (2003)	none	none	none	none	none	none	none	none	none	none	1 (2003)
India	1 (2005)	4 (2007, 2014, 2015, 2017)	none	none	1 (2009)	none	1 (2011)	none	3 (2022, 2023)	none	1 (2026)	11 (2005, 2007, 2009, 2011, 2014, 2015, 2017, 2022, 2023, 2026)
Indonesia	2 (2002, 2005)	4 (2007, 2013, 2015)	none	none	1 (2009)	none	1 (2011)	1 (2020)	3 (2022, 2023)	1 (2025)	none	13 (2002, 2005, 2007, 2009, 2011, 2013, 2015, 2020, 2022, 2023, 2025)
Iran	none	1 (2019)	none	none	none	none	none	none	none	none	none	1 (2019)
Ireland	none	1 (2013)	none	none	none	none	none	none	none	none	none	1 (2013)
Israel	1 (2006)	2 (2015, 2018)	none	none	none	none	none	none	none	none	none	3 (2006, 2015, 2018)
Italy	1 (2001)	5 (2014, 2016, 2017)	1 (2008)	1 (2009)	none	none	none	none	3 (2022, 2023, 2024)	none	1 (2026)	12 (2001, 2008, 2009, 2014, 2016, 2017, 2022, 2023, 2024, 2026)
Ivory Coast	none	1 (2014)	none	none	none	none	none	none	none	none	none	1 (2014)
Jamaica	none	1 (2015)	none	none	none	none	none	none	none	none	none	1 (2015)
Jordan	1 (2006)	2 (2015, 2018)	none	none	none	none	none	none	none	none	none	3 (2006, 2015, 2018)
Kazakhstan	1 (2006)	1 (2015)	none	none	none	none	none	none	none	none	none	2 (2006, 2015)
Kenya	none	1 (2016)	none	none	none	none	none	none	1 (2023)	none	none	2 (2016, 2023)
Kuwait	none	2 (2007, 2013)	none	none	none	none	none	none	none	none	none	2 (2007, 2013)
Kyrgyzstan	none	1 (2015)	none	none	none	none	none	none	none	none	none	1 (2015)
Laos	1 (2004)	2 (2013, 2016)	none	none	none	none	1 (2012)	none	none	1 (2024)	none	5 (2004, 2012, 2013, 2016, 2024)
Latvia	none	1 (2018)	none	none	none	none	none	none	none	none	none	1 (2018)
Lithuania	none	1 (2018)	none	none	none	none	none	none	1 (2023)	none	none	2 (2018, 2023)
Luxembourg	1 (2005)	1 (2015)	none	none	none	none	none	none	none	none	none	2 (2005, 2015)
Malaysia	2 (2002, 2005)	3 (2007, 2013, 2015)	none	none	none	none	none	none	1 (2023)	1 (2025)	1 (2025)	8 (2002, 2005, 2007, 2013, 2015, 2023, 2025)
Malta	none	1 (2017)	none	none	none	none	none	none	none	none	none	1 (2017)
Mexico	2 (2002, 2004)	1 (2014)	none	none	none	none	1 (2012)	none	none	none	none	4 (2002, 2004, 2012, 2014)
Mongolia	1 (2006)	3 (2013, 2015, 2016)	none	none	none	none	none	none	none	none	none	4 (2006, 2013, 2015, 2016)
Mozambique	none	1 (2014)	none	none	none	none	none	none	1 (2023)	none	none	2 (2014, 2023)
Myanmar	none	2 (2013, 2014)	none	none	none	none	none	none	none	none	none	2 (2013, 2014)
Netherlands	1 (2005)	2 (2014, 2019)	none	none	none	none	none	none	none	none	none	3 (2005, 2014, 2019)
New Zealand	1 (2002)	1 (2014)	none	none	none	none	none	none	none	none	none	2 (2002, 2014)
North Korea	2 (2002, 2004)	none	none	none	none	none	none	none	none	none	none	2 (2002, 2004)
Oman	none	2 (2014, 2020)	none	none	none	none	none	none	none	none	none	2 (2014, 2020)
Pakistan	1 (2005)	none	none	none	none	none	none	none	none	none	none	1 (2005)
Palestine	1 (2006)	2 (2015, 2018)	none	none	none	none	none	none	none	none	none	3 (2006, 2015, 2018)
Papua New Guinea	none	2 (2014, 2018)	none	none	none	none	none	none	none	none	none	2 (2014, 2018)
Paraguay	none	1 (2018)	none	none	none	none	none	none	1 (2024)	none	none	2 (2018, 2024)
Peru	none	1 (2016)	none	1 (2008)	none	none	none	none	none	1 (2024)	none	3 (2008, 2016, 2024)
Philippines	1 (2002)	6 (2006, 2007, 2013, 2015, 2017)	none	none	none	none	none	none	1 (2023)	1 (2025)	1 (2026)	10 (2002, 2006, 2007, 2013, 2015, 2017, 2023, 2025, 2026)
Poland	1 (2003)	1 (2013)	none	none	none	none	none	none	2 (2023)	none	none	4 (2003, 2013, 2023)
Portugal	none	1 (2014)	none	none	none	none	none	none	none	none	none	1 (2014)
Qatar	none	2 (2007, 2013)	none	none	none	none	none	none	1 (2023)	none	none	3 (2007, 2013, 2023)
Romania	none	1 (2018)	none	none	none	none	none	none	none	none	none	1 (2018)
Russia	2 (2003)	10 (2013, 2016, 2017, 2018, 2019)	1 (2008)	1 (2009)	none	none	1 (2012)	none	none	none	none	15 (2003, 2008, 2009, 2012, 2013, 2016, 2017, 2018, 2019)
Saudi Arabia	1 (2003)	3 (2007, 2013, 2020)	none	none	none	none	none	none	1 (2023)	none	none	5 (2003, 2007, 2013, 2020, 2023)
Serbia	none	1 (2018)	none	none	none	none	none	none	none	none	none	1 (2018)
Singapore	1 (2002)	5 (2013, 2014, 2015, 2016, 2018)	1 (2007)	none	1 (2009)	none	none	none	2 (2022, 2023)	none	none	10 (2002, 2007, 2009, 2013, 2014, 2015, 2016, 2018, 2022, 2023)
Slovakia	none	1 (2019)	none	none	none	none	none	none	none	none	none	1 (2019)
South Africa	1 (2002)	1	none	none	none	none	none	none	none	none	1 (2025)	3 (2002, ?, 2025)
South Korea	5 (2001, 2002, 2003, 2004, 2005)	3 (2006, 2015, 2018)	1 (2008)	1 (2009)	2 (2009, 2010)	1 (2010)	2 (2011, 2012)	none	3 (2023, 2024)	1 (2025)	2 (2025, 2026)	21 (2001, 2002, 2003, 2004, 2005, 2006, 2008, 2009, 2010, 2011, 2012, 2015, 2018, 2023, 2024, 2025, 2026)
Spain	1 (2003)	2 (2014, 2018)	none	none	none	none	none	none	1 (2022)	none	none	4 (2003, 2014, 2018, 2022)
Sri Lanka	none	1 (2014)	none	none	none	none	none	none	none	none	none	1 (2014)
Sweden	1 (2006)	1 (2017)	none	none	none	none	none	none	none	none	none	2 (2006, 2017)
Switzerland	none	2 (2014, 2019)	1 (2008)	1 (2009)	none	1 (2011)	none	none	1 (2024)	none	none	6 (2008, 2009, 2011, 2014, 2019, 2024)
Tajikistan	none	1 (2015)	none	none	none	none	none	none	none	none	none	1 (2015)
Thailand	2 (2002, 2003)	2 (2013, 2019)	none	1 (2009)	1 (2009)	none	none	none	2 (2022)	none	none	8 (2002, 2003, 2009, 2013, 2019, 2022)
Timor-Leste	1 (2002)	none	none	none	none	none	none	none	none	none	none	1 (2002)
Trinidad and Tobago	none	1 (2014)	none	none	none	none	none	none	none	none	none	1 (2014)
Turkey	1 (2006)	3 (2013, 2015)	none	none	none	none	none	none	none	none	none	4 (2006, 2013, 2015)
Turkmenistan	none	1 (2015)	none	none	none	none	none	none	none	none	none	1 (2015)
Ukraine	none	1 (2015)	none	none	none	none	none	none	1 (2023)	none	none	2 (2015, 2023)
United Arab Emirates	none	4 (2007, 2013, 2018, 2020)	none	none	none	none	none	none	2 (2023)	none	none	6 (2007, 2013, 2018, 2020, 2023)
United Kingdom	3 (2001, 2003, 2005)	6 (2007, 2013, 2014, 2016, 2017, 2019)	1 (2008)	1 (2009)	none	none	none	1 (2021)	3 (2021, 2022, 2023)	none	1 (2026)	16 (2001, 2003, 2005, 2007, 2008, 2009, 2013, 2014, 2016, 2017, 2019, 2021, 2022, 2023, 2026)
United States	7 (2001, 2002, 2003, 2004, 2006)	17 (2007, 2013, 2014, 2015, 2016, 2017, 2018, 2019)	1 (2007)	2 (2008)	2 (2009, 2010)	1 (2010)	5 (2011, 2012)	2 (2021)	8 (2022, 2023, 2024)	2 (2025)	2 (2026)	49 (2001, 2002, 2003, 2004, 2006, 2007, 2008, 2009, 2010, 2011, 2012, 2013, 2014, 2015, 2016, 2017, 2018, 2019, 2021, 2022, 2023, 2024, 2025, 2026)
Uruguay	none	1 (2018)	none	none	none	none	none	none	none	none	none	1 (2018)
Uzbekistan	1 (2006)	1 (2015)	none	none	none	none	none	none	none	none	none	2 (2006, 2015)
Vatican City	none	1 (2014)	none	none	none	none	none	none	1 (2022)	none	none	2 (2014, 2022)
Vietnam	2 (2002, 2004)	4 (2006, 2013, 2017)	none	none	none	none	none	1 (2020)	1 (2022)	1 (2025)	1 (2026)	10 (2002, 2004, 2006, 2013, 2017, 2020, 2022, 2025, 2026)

== Shinzo Abe (2006–2007) ==
Countries visited by Shinzo Abe during his first prime ministership

Shinzo Abe made 8 trips to 17 countries during his first premiership.

== Yasuo Fukuda (2007–2008) ==
Yasuo Fukuda made 8 trips to 8 countries during his premiership.

== Tarō Asō (2008–2009) ==
Tarō Asō made 9 trips to 7 countries during his premiership.

== Yukio Hatoyama (2009–2010) ==
Yukio Hatoyama made 10 trips to 8 countries during his premiership.

== Naoto Kan (2010–2011) ==
Naoto Kan made 7 trips to 7 countries during his premiership.

== Yoshihiko Noda (2011–2012) ==
Yoshihiko Noda made 16 trips to 10 countries during his premiership.

== Shinzo Abe (2012–2020) ==
Countries visited by Shinzo Abe during his second prime ministership

Shinzo Abe made 79 trips to 81 countries during his second premiership. In June 2013, Shinzō Abe became the first Japanese Prime Minister to visit Ireland.

== Yoshihide Suga (2020–2021) ==
Yoshihide Suga made 4 trips to 4 countries during his premiership.

== Fumio Kishida (2021–2024) ==
Countries visited by Fumio Kishida during his prime ministership

Fumio Kishida made 29 trips to 32 countries during his premiership. In March 2023, Kishida made the first visit to Ukraine since the beginning of the Russian invasion of Ukraine.

== Shigeru Ishiba (2024–2025) ==
Countries visited by Shigeru Ishiba during his prime ministership

Shigeru Ishiba made 8 trips to 10 countries during his premiership.

== Sanae Takaichi (2025–present) ==
Countries visited by Sanae Takaichi during her prime ministership

As of 20 November 2026, Sanae Takaichi has made 8 trips to 10 countries during her premiership.

== First visit by Country ==
Countries by first incumbent Japanese prime ministerial visit
Country	Date	Prime Minister	Ref.
United States	3 September 1951	Shigeru Yoshida	
United Kingdom	29 October 1954	Shigeru Yoshida	
China	25 September 1972	Kakuei Tanaka	
North Korea	17 September 2002	Junichiro Koizumi	
Ireland	19 June 2013	Shinzo Abe	

== See also ==
- Foreign policy of Japan
- Foreign relations of Japan
