= List of international prime ministerial trips made by Shigeru Ishiba =

The following is a list of international prime ministerial trips made by Shigeru Ishiba during his tenure as Prime Minister of Japan.

== Summary ==
The number of visits per country where he has travelled are:

- One visit to: Brazil, Canada, Indonesia, Laos, Malaysia, Peru, the Philippines, South Korea, and Vietnam
- Two visits to: the United States

World map highlighting countries visited by Shigeru Ishiba during his premiership. One visit Two visits Japan

== 2024 ==
No.	Country	Locations	Dates	Details	Image
1	Laos	Vientiane	10–11 October	Ishiba attended the ASEAN-related summits, including the ASEAN+3 Summit, ASEAN–Japan Summit, East Asia Summit, and the Second ASEAN Global Dialogue.	
2	Peru	Lima	14–17 November	Ishiba attended the APEC summit.	
2	Brazil	Rio de Janeiro	17–19 November	Ishiba attended the G20 summit.	

== 2025 ==
No.	Country	Locations	Dates	Details	Image
3	Malaysia	Kuala Lumpur	9–10 January	Ishiba met with Prime Minister Anwar Ibrahim.	
3	Indonesia	Jakarta	10–11 January	Ishiba met with President Prabowo Subianto.	
4	United States	Washington, D.C.	6–8 February	Ishiba met with President Donald Trump.	
5	Vietnam	Hanoi	27–29 April	Ishiba met with President Lương Cường, Prime Minister Phạm Minh Chính, National Assembly Chairman Trần Thanh Mẫn, and Communist Party General Secretary Tô Lâm. Laid a wreath at the Ho Chi Minh Mausoleum and the Memorial to the Revolutionary Martyrs. Visited the Vietnam National Museum of History with Prime Minister Chính and the VNU Vietnam Japan University.	
5	Philippines	Manila, Cavinti	29–30 April	Ishiba met with President Bongbong Marcos. Laid a wreath at the Rizal Monument. Visited the Japanese memorial garden by Lake Caliraya in Cavinti, Laguna. Visited the Philippine Coast Guard headquarters in Port Area, Manila, and toured the Japanese-made BRP Teresa Magbanua ship.	
6	Canada	Kananaskis	15–17 June	Ishiba attended the G7 summit.	
7	United States	New York City	23 September	Ishiba delivering a speech at the general debate of the eightieth session of the United Nations General Assembly.	
8	South Korea	Busan	30 September	Ishiba met with President Lee Jae Myung.	

== Multilateral meetings ==
Prime Minister Ishiba attended the following summits during his term as prime minister (2024–2025):

Group	Year	
Group	2024	2025
UNGA		23 September, (United States) New York City
ASEM	None	None
APEC	15–16 November, (Peru) Lima	
EAS (ASEAN+3)	9–11 October, (Laos) Vientiane	
ASEAN–Japan	10 October, (Laos) Vientiane	
G7		16–17 June, (Canada) Kananaskis
G20	18–19 November, (Brazil) Rio de Janeiro	
QUAD		None
China–Japan–Korea		None
██ = Future event ██ = Did not attend^aJapan was not a full member.

== See also ==
- Foreign relations of Japan
- List of international trips made by prime ministers of Japan
