= List of international prime ministerial trips made by Shinzo Abe =

The following is a list of international prime ministerial trips made by Shinzo Abe during his tenure as the Prime Minister of Japan.

== Summary ==
=== First premiership ===
The number of visits per country where he has travelled are:

- One visit to: Australia, Belgium, China, France, India, Indonesia, Kuwait, Malaysia, Qatar, Saudi Arabia, South Korea, the United Arab Emirates, the United Kingdom, the United States, Vietnam
- Two visits to: Germany, the Philippines

World map highlighting countries visited by Shinzo Abe during his first premiership. One visit Two visits Japan

=== Second premiership ===
The number of visits per country where he has travelled are:

- One visit to: Bahrain, Bangladesh, Brunei, Bulgaria, Cambodia, Chile, Colombia, Cuba, Denmark, Djibouti, Egypt, Estonia, Ethiopia, Finland, Iran, Ireland, Ivory Coast, Jamaica, Kazakhstan, Kenya, Kuwait, Kyrgyzstan, Latvia, Lithuania, Luxembourg, Malta, Mexico, Mozambique, New Zealand, Paraguay, Peru, Poland, Portugal, Qatar, Romania, Serbia, Slovakia, Sri Lanka, South Africa, Sweden, Tajikistan, Trinidad and Tobago, Turkmenistan, Ukraine, Uruguay, Uzbekistan, Vatican City
- Two visits to: Argentina, Brazil, Israel, Jordan, Laos, Malaysia, Myanmar, Netherlands, Oman, Palestine, Papua New Guinea, Saudi Arabia, Spain, South Korea, Switzerland, Thailand
- Three visits to: Australia, Canada, India, Indonesia, Mongolia, the United Arab Emirates, Turkey, Vietnam
- Four visits to: China, the Philippines
- Five visits to: Germany, Italy, Singapore, the United Kingdom
- Seven visits to: France
- Eight visits to: Belgium
- Ten visits to: Russia
- Sixteen visits to: the United States

World map highlighting countries visited by Shinzo during his second premiership. One visit Two visits Three visits Four visits Five visits Six to eight visits Nine or more visits Japan

== First premiership (2006–2007) ==
=== 2006 ===
No.	Country	Locations	Dates	Details	Image
1	China	Beijing	8–9 October	Abe met with President Hu Jintao and Premier Wen Jiabao.	
1	South Korea	Seoul	9 October	Abe met with President Roh Moo-hyun and Prime Minister Han Myeong-sook.	
2	Vietnam	Hanoi	17–20 November	Abe attended the APEC summit. He also met with Prime MInister Nguyễn Tấn Dũng, President Nguyễn Minh Triết, and Communist Party General Secretary Nông Đức Mạnh.	
3	Philippines	Manila	8–10 December	Abe met with President Gloria Macapagal Arroyo.	

=== 2007 ===
No.	Country	Locations	Dates	Details	Image
4	United Kingdom	London	9 January	Abe met with Prime Minister Tony Blair. He also received courtesy calls from Chancellor Gordon Brown and Conservative Party Leader David Cameron.	
4	Germany	Berlin	10 January	Abe met with Chancellor Angela Merkel and President Horst Köhler.	
4	Belgium	Brussels	11–12 January	Abe met with European Commission President José Manuel Barroso and Belgian Prime MInister Guy Verhofstadt.	
4	France	Paris	12–13 January	Abe met with President Jacques Chirac.	
4	Philippines	Cebu	14–15 January	Abe attended the East Asia Summit.	
5	United States	Washington, D.C.	26–27 April	Met with President George W. Bush.	
5	Saudi Arabia	Riyadh	28–29 April	Met with King Abdullah.	
5	United Arab Emirates	Abu Dhabi; Dubai	29–30 April	Met with President Khalifa bin Zayed Al Nahyan.	
5	Kuwait	Kuwait City	30 April – 1 May	Met with Emir Sabah Al-Ahmad Al-Jaber Al-Sabah and Prime Minister Nasser Al-Mohammed Al-Sabah.	
5	Qatar	Doha	1–2 May	Met with Emir Hamad bin Khalifa Al Thani and Prime Minister Hamad bin Jassim bin Jaber Al Thani.	
5	Egypt	Cairo	2–3 May	Met with President Hosni Mubarak and Prime Minister Ahmed Nazif.	
6	Germany	Berlin; Heiligendamm	5–8 June	Attended the Japan–EU Summit and the G8 summit.	
7	Indonesia	Jakarta	19–21 August	Met with President Susilo Bambang Yudhoyono.	
7	India	New Delhi	21–23 August	Met with Prime Minister Manmohan Singh and President Pratibha Patil.	
7	Malaysia	Kuala Lumpur	23–25 August	Met with Prime Minister Abdullah Ahmad Badawi.	
8	Australia	Sydney	8–9 September	Abe attended the APEC summit.	

== Second premiership (2012–2020) ==
=== 2013 ===
No.	Country	Locations	Dates	Details	Image
1	Vietnam	Hanoi	16 January	Abe met with Prime Minister Nguyễn Tấn Dũng, Communist Party General Secretary Nguyễn Phú Trọng, and President Trương Tấn Sang.	
1	Thailand	Bangkok	17 January	Abe met with Prime Minister Yingluck Shinawatra.	
1	Indonesia	Jakarta	18 January	Abe met with President Susilo Bambang Yudhoyono.	
2	United States	Washington, D.C.	22–23 February	Abe met with President Barack Obama. He later delivered a speech at the Center for Strategic and International Studies.	
3	Mongolia	Ulanbaatar	30–31 March	Abe met with President Tsakhiagiin Elbegdorj, Prime Minister Norovyn Altankhuyag, and State Great Khural Chairman Zandaakhüügiin Enkhbold.	
4	Russia	Moscow	29–30 April	Abe met with President Vladimir Putin and State Duma Chairman Sergey Naryshkin.	
4	Saudi Arabia	Riyadh	30 April – 1 May	Abe met with Crown Prince Salman.	
4	United Arab Emirates	Abu Dhabi; Dubai	1–2 May	Abe met with Crown Prince Mohamed bin Zayed Al Nahyan.	
4	Turkey	Ankara	2–3 May	Abe met with Prime Minister Recep Tayyip Erdoğan.	
5	Myanmar	Yangon; Naypyidaw	25–26 May	Abe met with President Thein Sein.	
6	Poland	Warsaw	15–16 June	Abe met with Prime Minister Donald Tusk and President Bronislaw Komorowski.	
6	United Kingdom	Northern Ireland; London	17–19 June	Abe attended the G8 summit.	
6	Ireland	Dublin	19 June	Abe met with President Michael D. Higgins and Taoiseach Enda Kenny.	
7	Malaysia	Kuala Lumpur	25 July	Abe met with Prime Minister Najib Razak.	
7	Singapore	Singapore	26 July	Abe met with Prime Minister Lee Hsien Loong and President Tony Tan.	
7	Philippines	Manila	27 July	Abe met with President Benigno Aquino III.	
8	Bahrain	Manama	24–25 August	Abe met with Prime Minister Khalifa bin Salman Al Khalifa and King Hamad bin Isa Al Khalifa.	
8	Kuwait	Kuwait City	26 August	Abe met with Prime Minister Jaber Al-Mubarak Al-Hamad Al-Sabah and Emir Sabah Al-Ahmad Al-Jaber Al-Sabah.	
8	Djibouti	Djibouti City	27 August	Abe met with President Ismaïl Omar Guelleh.	
8	Qatar	Doha	28 August	Abe met with Emir Tamim bin Hamad Al Thani and Prime Minister Abdullah bin Nasser bin Khalifa Al Thani.	
9	Russia	Saint Petersburg	5–6 September	Abe attended the G20 summit.	
10	Canada	Ottawa	23–24 September	Abe met with Prime Minister Stephen Harper.	
10	United States	New York City	24–27 September	Abe delivered a speech at the general debate of the sixty-eighth session of the United Nations General Assembly.	
11	Indonesia	Bali	7–8 October	Abe attended the APEC summit.	
11	Brunei	Bandar Seri Begawan	9–10 October	Abe attended the ASEAN-related summits, including the ASEAN+3 Summit, ASEAN–Japan Summit, and the East Asia Summit.	
12	Turkey	Istanbul	28–29 October	Abe attended the opening of Marmaray.	
13	Cambodia	Phnom Penh	16 November	Abe met with Prime Minister Hun Sen. He also met with King Norodom Sihamoni.	
13	Laos	Vientiane	17 November	Abe met with President Choummaly Sayasone and Prime Minister Thongsing Thammavong.	

=== 2014 ===
No.	Country	Locations	Dates	Details	Image
14	Oman	Muscat	9 January	Abe met with Sultan Qaboos bin Said.	
14	Ivory Coast	Abidjan	10–11 January	Abe met with President Alassane Ouattara.	
14	Mozambique	Maputo	12 January	Abe met with President Armando Guebuza.	
14	Ethiopia	Addis Ababa	13 January	Abe met with Prime Minister Hailemariam Desalegn and President Mulatu Teshome.	
15	Switzerland	Davos	22 January	Abe attended the annual meeting of the World Economic Forum.	
16	India	New Delhi	25–26 January	Abe met with President Pranab Mukherjee and Prime Minister Manmohan Singh. He also attended the Republic Day Parade as its chief guest.	
17	Netherlands	The Hague	23–26 March	Abe attended the Nuclear Security Summit.	
18	Germany	Berlin	30 April	Abe met with Chancellor Angela Merkel.	
18	United Kingdom	London	1–2 May	Abe met with Princess Royal Anne and Prime Minister David Cameron.	
18	Portugal	Lisbon	2–3 May	Abe met with President Aníbal Cavaco Silva and Prime Minister Pedro Passos Coelho.	
18	Spain	Santiago de Compostela	4 May	Abe met with Prime Minister Mariano Rajoy.	
18	France	Paris	5–6 May	Abe met with President François Hollande. He also gave a keynote address at the OECD Ministerial Council Meeting and met Slovenian Prime Minister Alenka Bratušek.	
18	Belgium	Brussels	6–7 May	Abe met with NATO Secretary General Anders Fogh Rasmussen and signed the Individual Partnership and Cooperation Programme between Japan and NATO. He then met with Belgian King Philippe and Belgian Prime Minister Elio Di Rupo. He also met with European Council President Herman Van Rompuy and European Commission President José Manuel Barroso.	
19	Singapore	Singapore	30–31 May	Abe met with US Secretary of Defense Chuck Hagel. He then delivered a keynote speech at the Shangri-La Dialogue. He also met with Prime MInister Lee Hsien Loong.	
20	Belgium	Brussels	4–5 June	Abe attended the G7 summit.	
20	Italy	Rome	6 June	Abe met with Prime Minister Matteo Renzi, President Giorgio Napolitano, and Rome Mayor Ignazio Marino.	
20	Vatican City	Apostolic Palace	6 June	Abe met with Pope Francis, followed by a meeting with Cardinal Secretary of State Pietro Parolin.	
21	New Zealand	Auckland	7 July	Abe met with Prime Minister John Key.	
21	Australia	Canberra; Pilbara; Perth	8–9 July	Abe delivered a speech at the Australian Parliament. He also met with Prime Minister Tony Abbott and Labor Party Leader Bill Shorten. He then travelled to Pilbara, where he toured the West Angelas mine. Afterwards, he visited Perth, where he met with Western Australia Premier Colin Barnett.	
21	Papua New Guinea	Port Moresby; Wewak	10–11 July	Abe met with Governor-General Michael Ogio and Prime Minister Peter O’Neill. He then visited Wewak, where he met with East Sepik Governor Michael Somare.	
22	Mexico	Mexico City; State of Mexico	25–26 July	Abe met with President Enrique Peña Nieto. He also visited the National Museum of Anthropology and the former site of Teotihuacan.	
22	Trinidad and Tobago	Port of Spain	27–28 July	Abe met with Prime Minister Kamla Persad-Bissessar, followed by meetings with Antigua and Barbuda Prime Minister Gaston Browne and Jamaican Prime Minister Portia Simpson-Miller. He then attended the Japan-CARICOM Summit.	
22	Colombia	Bogotá	29 July	Abe met with President Juan Manuel Santos.	
22	Chile	Santiago	30–31 July	Abe met with President Michelle Bachelet.	
22	Brazil	Brasília; São Paulo	1–2 August	Abe met with President Dilma Rousseff. He visited São Paulo where he met São Paulo Governor Geraldo Alckmin.	
23	Bangladesh	Dhaka	6 September	Abe met with Prime Minister Sheikh Hasina and President Mohammad Abdul Hamid. He also received courtesy calls from Bangladesh Nationalist Party Chairperson Khaleda Zia and Jatiya Party Chairperson Rowshan Ershad.	
23	Sri Lanka	Colombo	7 September	Abe met with President Mahinda Rajapaksa and visited the Parliament.	
24	United States	New York City	22–26 September	Abe delivered a speech at the general debate of the sixty-ninth session of the United Nations General Assembly.	
25	Italy	Milan	16–17 October	Abe attended the Asia–Europe Meeting.	
26	China	Beijing	9–11 November	Abe attended the APEC summit.	
26	Myanmar	Naypyidaw	12–13 November	Abe attended the ASEAN-related summits, including the ASEAN+3 Summit, ASEAN–Japan Summit, and the East Asia Summit.	
26	Australia	Brisbane	14–17 November	Abe attended the G20 summit.	

=== 2015 ===
No.	Country	Locations	Dates	Details	Image
27	Egypt	Cairo	16–17 January	Abe met with President Abdel Fattah el-Sisi and Prime MInister Ibrahim Mahlab.	
27	Jordan	Amman	17–18 January	Abe met with King Abdullah II and Prime Minister Abdullah Ensour.	
27	Israel	Tel Aviv; Jerusalem	18–20 January	Abe met with Prime MInister Benjamin Netanyahu. He also visited Yad Vashem.	
27	Palestine	Ramallah	20 January	Abe met with President Mahmoud Abbas.	
28	Singapore	Singapore	29–30 March	Abe attended the State funeral of former Prime Minister Lee Kuan Yew.	
29	Indonesia	Jakarta	21–23 April	Abe attended the Asian-African Summit 2015.	
30	United States	Boston; Washington, D.C.; San Francisco; Los Angeles	26 April – 3 May	Abe attended a state dinner hosted by President Barack Obama. Delivered a speech at a joint session of the US Congress.	
31	Ukraine	Kyiv	5–6 June	Abe met with President Petro Poroshenko, Prime Minister Arseniy Yatsenyuk, and Verkhovna Rada Chairman Volodymyr Groysman.	
31	Germany	Schloss Elmau	7–9 June	Abe attended the G7 summit.	
32	United States	New York City	26–30 September	Abe delivered a speech at the general debate of the seventieth session of the United Nations General Assembly.	
32	Jamaica	Kingston	1–2 October		
33	Mongolia	Ulaanbaatar	22 October	Abe met with President Tsakhiagiin Elbegdorj, Prime Minister Chimediin Saikhanbileg, and State Great Khural Chairman Zandaakhüügiin Enkhbold.	
33	Turkmenistan	Ashgabat	23 October	Abe met with President Gurbanguly Berdimuhamedow.	
33	Tajikistan	Dushanbe	24 October	Abe met with President Emomali Rahmon.	
33	Uzbekistan	Tashkent	25 October	Abe met with President Islam Karimov.	
33	Kyrgyzstan	Bishkek	26 October	Abe met with President Almazbek Atambayev.	
33	Kazakhstan	Astana	27–28 October	Abe met with Nursultan Nazarbayev and Prime Minister Karim Massimov.	
34	South Korea	Seoul	1–2 November	Abe attended the China–Japan–South Korea trilateral summit.	
35	Turkey	Istanbul; Antalya	13–17 November	Abe met with President Recep Tayyip Erdoğan. He then attended the G20 summit.	framless
35	Philippines	Manila	18–19 November	Abe met with President Benigno Aquino III. Also attended the APEC summit.	
35	Malaysia	Kuala Lumpur	20–23 November	Abe attended the ASEAN-related summits, including the ASEAN+3 Summit, ASEAN–Japan Summit, and the East Asia Summit.	
36	France	Paris	29–30 November	Abe attended the United Nations Climate Change Conference.	
36	Luxembourg	Luxembourg City	1–2 December	Abe met with Prime Minister Xavier Bettel.	
37	India	New Delhi	11–13 December	Abe met with Prime Minister Narendra Modi.	

=== 2016 ===
No.	Country	Locations	Dates	Details	Image
38	United States	Washington, D.C.	30 March – 1 April	Abe attended the Nuclear Security Summit.	
39	Italy	Florence	1–2 May	Abe met with Prime Minister Matteo Renzi.	
39	France	Paris	2 May	Abe met with President François Hollande.	
39	Belgium	Brussels	3–4 May	Abe met with King Philippe and Prime Minister Charles Michel. He then met with European Council President Donald Tusk and European Commission President Jean-Claude Juncker.	
39	Germany	Berlin	4 May	Abe met with Chancellor Angela Merkel.	
39	United Kingdom	London	5 May	Abe met with Prime Minister David Cameron.	
39	Russia	Sochi	6 May	Abe met with President Vladimir Putin.	
40	Mongolia	Ulanbaatar	14–16 July	Abe attended the Asia–Europe Meeting.	
41	Brazil	Rio de Janeiro	21 August	Abe attended the 2016 Summer Olympics closing ceremony.	
42	Singapore	Singapore	25 August	Abe attended to gave condolences on the passing of former President S. R. Nathan.	
42	Kenya	Nairobi	26–28 August	Abe attended the Tokyo International Conference on African Development.	
43	Russia	Vladivostok	2–3 September	Abe attended the Eastern Economic Forum.	
43	China	Hangzhou	4–5 September	Abe attended the G20 summit.	
43	Laos	Vientiane	6–8 September	Abe attended the ASEAN-related summits, including the ASEAN+3 Summit, ASEAN–Japan Summit, and the East Asia Summit.	
44	United States	New York City	19–21 September	Abe delivered a speech at the general debate of the seventy-first session of the United Nations General Assembly.	
44	Cuba	Havana	22–23 September	Abe met with former Council of State President Fidel Castro and Council of State President Raúl Castro.	
45	United States	New York City	17 November	Abe travelled to meet President-elect Donald Trump.	
45	Peru	Lima	18–20 November	Abe attended the APEC summit.	
45	Argentina	Buenos Aires	21 November	Abe met with President Mauricio Macri.	
46	United States	Honolulu	26–27 December	Abe met with President Barack Obama.	

=== 2017 ===
No.	Country	Locations	Dates	Details	Image
47	Philippines	Manila; Davao City	12–13 January	Abe met with President Rodrigo Duterte, and later visited Davao City, Duterte's hometown.	
47	Australia	Sydney	14–15 January	Abe met with Prime Minister Malcolm Turnbull.	
47	Indonesia	Jakarta	15–16 January	Abe met with President Joko Widodo.	
47	Vietnam	Hanoi	16–17 January	Abe met with Prime Minister Nguyễn Xuân Phúc, Communist Party General Secretary Nguyễn Phú Trọng, President Trần Đại Quang, and National Assembly Chairwoman Nguyễn Thị Kim Ngân.	
48	United States	Washington, D.C.	10–11 February	Abe met with President Donald Trump.	
49	Germany	Hanover	19–20 March	Abe met with Chancellor Angela Merkel.	
49	France	Paris	20 March	Abe met with President François Hollande.	
49	Belgium	Brussels	21 March	Abe met with European Council President Donald Tusk and European Commission President Jean-Claude Juncker.	
49	Italy	Rome	21 March	Abe met with Prime Minister Paolo Gentiloni.	
50	Russia	Moscow	27 April	Abe met with President Vladimir Putin.	
50	United Kingdom	London	28–29 April	Abe met with Prime Minister Theresa May.	
51	Italy	Taormina	25–27 May	Abe attended the G7 summit.	
51	Malta	Valletta	27 May	Abe met with Prime Minister Joseph Muscat.	
52	Belgium	Brussels	5–6 July	Abe met with Prime Minister Charles Michel. He also met with European Council President Donald Tusk and European Commission President Jean-Claude Juncker.	
52	Germany	Hamburg	6–8 July	Abe attended the G20 summit.	
52	Sweden	Stockholm	9 July	Abe met with Prime Minister Stefan Löfven.	
52	Finland	Helsinki	9–10 July	Abe met with President Sauli Niinistö.	
52	Denmark	Copenhagen	10 July	Abe met with Prime Minister Lars Løkke Rasmussen.	
53	Russia	Vladivostok	6–7 September	Abe attended the Eastern Economic Forum.	
54	India	Ahmedabad	13–14 September	Abe met with Prime Minister Narendra Modi.	
55	United States	New York City	18–21 September	Abe delivered a speech at the general debate of the seventy-second session of the United Nations General Assembly.	
56	Vietnam	Da Nang	9–11 November	Abe attended the APEC summit.	
56	Philippines	Manila	12–14 November	Abe attended the ASEAN-related summits, including the ASEAN+3 Summit, ASEAN–Japan Summit, and the East Asia Summit.	

=== 2018 ===
No.	Country	Locations	Dates	Details	Image
57	Estonia	Tallinn	12 January	Abe met with President Kersti Kaljulaid and Prime Minister Jüri Ratas.	
57	Latvia	Riga	13 January	Abe met with Prime Minister Māris Kučinskis.	
57	Lithuania	Vilnius	13–14 January	Abe met with President Dalia Grybauskaitė and Prime Minister Saulius Skvernelis.	
57	Bulgaria	Sofia	14 January	Abe met with Prime Minister Boyko Borisov and President Rumen Radev.	
57	Serbia	Belgrade	15 January	Abe met with President Aleksandar Vučić.	
57	Romania	Bucharest	16 January	Abe met with President Klaus Iohannis.	
58	South Korea	Pyeongchang	9–10 February	Abe met with President Moon Jae-in. He also attended the 2018 Winter Olympics opening ceremony.	
59	United States	Palm Beach	17–18 April	Abe visited President Donald Trump at his residence in Mar-a-Lago.	
60	United Arab Emirates	Abu Dhabi	29–30 April	Abe met with Crown Prince Mohamed bin Zayed Al Nahyan.	
60	Jordan	Amman	1 May	Abe met with Prime Minister Hani Mulki and King Abdullah II.	
60	Palestine	Jericho; Bethlehem	2 May	Abe visited the Jericho Agro-Industrial Park.	
60	Israel	Tel Aviv	2 May	Abe met with Prime Minister Benjamin Netanyahu.	
61	Russia	Saint Petersburg; Moscow	25–26 May	Abe attended the St. Petersburg International Economic Forum and met with French President Emmanuel Macron. He then met with Russian President Vladimir Putin in Moscow.	
62	United States	Washington, D.C.	6–7 June	Abe met with President Donald Trump.	
62	Canada	Charlevoix	8–9 June	Abe attended the G7 summit.	
63	Russia	Vladivostok	11–13 September	Abe attended the Eastern Economic Forum.	
64	United States	New York City	23–26 September	Abe delivered a speech at the general debate of the seventy-third session of the United Nations General Assembly.	
65	Spain	Madrid	16 October	Abe met with King Felipe VI and Prime Minister Pedro Sánchez.	
65	France	Paris	17 October	Abe met with President Emmanuel Macron.	
65	Belgium	Brussels	18–19 October	Abe attended the Asia–Europe Meeting.	
66	China	Beijing	25–26 October	Abe met with Premier Li Keqiang, President Xi Jinping, and National People's Congress Standing Committee Chairman Li Zhanshu. He also interacted with students from the Peking University.	
67	Singapore	Singapore	14–15 November	Abe attended the ASEAN-related summits, including the ASEAN+3 Summit, ASEAN–Japan Summit, and the East Asia Summit.	
67	Australia	Darwin	16–17 November	Abe visited Darwin Cenotaph together with Prime Minister Scott Morrison and attended a reception held by Northern Territory Chief Minister Michael Gunner.	
67	Papua New Guinea	Port Moresby	17–18 November	Abe attended the APEC summit.	
68	Argentina	Buenos Aires	29 November – 1 December	Abe attended the G20 summit.	
68	Uruguay	Montevideo	2 December	Abe met with President Tabaré Vázquez.	
68	Paraguay	Asunción	2 December	Abe met with President Abdo Benitez.	

=== 2019 ===
No.	Country	Locations	Dates	Details	Image
69	Netherlands	Amsterdam	9 January	Abe met with Prime Minister Mark Rutte.	
69	United Kingdom	London	10 January	Abe met with Prime Minister Theresa May.	
70	Russia	Moscow	21–22 January	Abe met with President Vladimir Putin.	
70	Switzerland	Davos	23 January	Abe attended the annual meeting of the World Economic Forum.	
71	France	Paris	22–23 April	Abe met with President Emmanuel Macron.	
71	Slovakia	Bratislava	24 April	Abe met with Polish Prime Minister Mateusz Morawiecki and Slovak Prime Minister Peter Pellegrini. He also attended a summit with Visegrád Group countries.	
71	Belgium	Brussels	25 April	Abe met with European Council President Donald Tusk and European Commission President Jean-Claude Juncker.	
71	United States	Washington, D.C.	26–27 April	Abe met with President Donald Trump.	
71	Canada	Ottawa	27–28 April	Abe met with Prime Minister Justin Trudeau.	
72	Iran	Tehran	12–13 June	Abe met with President Hassan Rouhani. He also met with Supreme Leader Ali Khamenei.	
73	France	Biarritz	24–26 August	Abe attended the G7 summit.	
74	Russia	Vladivostok	4–6 September	Abe attended the Eastern Economic Forum.	
75	United States	New York City	23–25 September	Abe delivered a speech at the general debate of the seventy-fourth session of the United Nations General Assembly.	
76	Belgium	Brussels	26–27 September	Abe met with European Commission President Jean-Claude Juncker.	
77	Thailand	Bangkok	3–5 November	Abe attended the ASEAN-related summits, including the ASEAN+3 Summit, ASEAN–Japan Summit, and the East Asia Summit.	
78	China	Chengdu	23–25 December	Abe attended the China–Japan–South Korea trilateral summit.	

=== 2020 ===
No.	Country	Locations	Dates	Details	Image
79	Saudi Arabia	Riyadh; Al-'Ula	11–13 January	Abe met with King Salman and Crown Prince Mohammed bin Salman. He also visited the UNESCO World Heritage Site Hegra.	
79	United Arab Emirates	Abu Dhabi	13–14 January	Abe met with Crown Prince Mohamed bin Zayed Al Nahyan.	
79	Oman	Muscat	14 January	Abe met with Sultan Haitham bin Tariq.	

== Multilateral meetings ==
=== First premiership ===
Prime Minister Abe attended the following summits during his first prime ministership (2006–2007):

Group	Year	
Group	2006	2007
APEC	18–19 November (Vietnam) Hanoi	8–9 September (Australia) Sydney
EAS (ASEAN+3)	None	15 January (Philippines) Mandaue
ASEAN–Japan	None	14 January (Philippines) Mandaue
G8		6–8 June (Germany) Heiligendamm

=== Second premiership ===
Prime Minister Abe attended the following summits during his second prime ministership (2012–2020):

Group	Year							
Group	2013	2014	2015	2016	2017	2018	2019	2020
UNGA	26 September (United States) New York City	25 September (United States) New York City	29 September (United States) New York City	21 September (United States) New York City	20 September (United States) New York City	25 September (United States) New York City	24 September (United States) New York City	
ASEM	None	16–17 October (Italy) Milan	None	15–16 July (Mongolia) Ulaanbaatar	None	18–19 October (Belgium) Brussels	None	None
APEC	5–7 October (Indonesia) Denpasar	10–11 November (China) Beijing	18–19 November (Philippines) Manila	19–20 November (Peru) Lima	10–11 November (Vietnam) Đà Nẵng	17–18 November (Papua New Guinea) Port Moresby	16–17 November (canceled) (Chile) Santiago	
EAS (ASEAN+3)	9–10 October (Brunei) Bandar Seri Begawan	12–13 November (Myanmar) Naypyidaw	21–22 November (Malaysia) Kuala Lumpur	6–8 September (Laos) Vientiane	13–14 November (Philippines) Pasay	14–15 November; Singapore	4 November (Thailand) Bangkok	
ASEAN–Japan	9 October (Brunei) Bandar Seri Begawan	12 November (Myanmar) Naypyidaw	22 November (Malaysia) Kuala Lumpur	7 September (Laos) Vientiane	13 November (Philippines) Pasay	14 November; Singapore	4 November (Thailand) Bangkok	
G7	17–18 June (United Kingdom) Enniskillen	4–5 June (Belgium) Brussels	7–8 June (Germany) Krün	26–27 May (Japan) Shima	26–27 May (Italy) Taormina	8–9 June (Canada) La Malbaie	24–26 August (France) Biarritz	10–12 June (canceled) (United States) Camp David
G20	5–6 September (Russia) Saint Petersburg	15–16 November (Australia) Brisbane	15–16 November (Turkey) Antalya	4–5 September (China) Hangzhou	7–8 July (Germany) Hamburg	30 November – 1 December (Argentina) Buenos Aires	28–29 June (Japan) Osaka	
China–Japan–Korea	None	None	1 November (South Korea) Seoul	None	None	9 May (Japan) Tokyo	23–25 December (China) Chengdu	None
Others	None	Nuclear Security Summit; 24–25 March (Netherlands) The Hague	United Nations Climate Change Conference; 29–30 November (France) Paris	Nuclear Security Summit; 31 March – 1 April (United States) Washington, D.C.	None	None	None	None

== See also ==
- Foreign relations of Japan
- List of international trips made by prime ministers of Japan
