= List of international prime ministerial trips made by Tarō Asō =

The following is a list of international prime ministerial trips made by Tarō Asō during his tenure as the prime minister of Japan.

== Summary ==
The number of visits per country where he has travelled are:

- One visit to: Czech Republic, Germany, Italy, Peru, Russia, South Korea, Switzerland, Thailand, United Kingdom
- Two visits to: China
- Two visits to: United States

== 2008 ==
| No. | Country | Locations | Dates | Details |
|---|---|---|---|---|
| 1 | China | Beijing | 24–25 October | Prime Minister Asō attended the 7th Asia–Europe Meeting (ASEM7), where he held discussions with Chinese President Hu Jintao and Premier Wen Jiabao on Japan–China relations, regional cooperation, and the global financial crisis. |
| 2 | Peru | Lima | 22–23 November | Prime Minister Asō attended the 16th APEC Economic Leaders' Meeting, where discussions focused on the global financial crisis, international trade, investment, and economic cooperation in the Asia-Pacific region. |
| 3 | United States | New York City | 25 September | Prime Minister Asō visited New York City to attend the general debate of the sixty-third session of the United Nations General Assembly. He delivered Japan's national statement and participated in discussions on international issues, including the global food crisis and climate change. He also held meetings with United Nations Secretary-General Ban Ki-moon and other world leaders. |
| 4 | United States | Washington, D.C. | 14–15 November | Prime Minister Asō visited Washington, D.C. to participate in the G20 Summit on Financial Markets and the World Economy. The summit was convened in response to the global financial crisis, with leaders discussing measures to stabilize international financial markets, reform the international financial system, and restore global economic growth. The meeting concluded with the adoption of the Washington Declaration. |

== 2009 ==
| No. | Country | Locations | Dates | Details |
|---|---|---|---|---|
| 1 | South Korea | Seoul | 11–12 January | Prime Minister Asō visited Seoul for bilateral talks with President Lee Myung-bak. The two leaders discussed Japan–South Korea relations, economic cooperation, cultural exchanges, and regional security issues, including North Korea's nuclear programme. |
| 2 | Switzerland | Davos | 31 January | Prime Minister Asō attended the World Economic Forum Annual Meeting in Davos, where he delivered a special address entitled "My Prescription for Revitalizing the World Economy", outlining Japan's proposals for addressing the global financial crisis and restoring economic growth. |
| 3 | Russia | Sakhalin | 18 February | Prime Minister Asō visited Sakhalin to attend the opening ceremony of the liquefied natural gas (LNG) plant constructed as part of the Sakhalin-II oil and natural gas development project, highlighting energy cooperation between Japan and Russia. |
| 4 | Thailand | Pattaya | 11 April | Prime Minister Asō travelled to Pattaya to attend ASEAN-related summit meetings. However, the meetings were cancelled following anti-government protests and the storming of the conference venue. During his visit, Japan announced its Growth Initiative towards Doubling the Size of Asia's Economy, intended to promote regional economic growth and cooperation. |
| 5 | China | Beijing | 29–30 April | Prime Minister Asō visited Beijing for bilateral summit meetings with Chinese President Hu Jintao and Premier Wen Jiabao. Discussions covered bilateral relations, economic cooperation, regional and international affairs, and the global financial crisis. |
| 6 | Czech Republic | Prague | 3–4 May | Prime Minister Asō visited Prague and held talks with Czech Prime Minister Mirek Topolánek. Discussions focused on Japan–Czech Republic relations, the global economic crisis, climate change, and international cooperation. |
| 7 | Germany | Berlin | 4–5 May | Prime Minister Asō visited Berlin and held talks with German Chancellor Angela Merkel. Discussions covered Japan–Germany relations, the global financial crisis, climate change, and international economic and political cooperation. |
| 8 | Italy | L'Aquila | 8–10 July | Prime Minister Asō visited L'Aquila to attend the 35th G8 summit. Discussions focused on the global financial crisis, economic recovery, climate change, food security, international development, and global security. The summit concluded with the adoption of the L'Aquila G8 Declaration. |
| 9 | United Kingdom | London | 1–2 April | Prime Minister Asō visited London to attend the 2009 G20 London summit. World leaders discussed international economic recovery, financial regulation, reform of international financial institutions, and measures to combat the global recession. The summit concluded with agreements to strengthen the international financial system and coordinate international efforts to restore economic growth. |

== Multilateral meetings ==
Prime Minister Asō attended the following summits during his prime ministership (2008–2009):

| Group | Year | |
| Group | 2008 | 2009 |
|---|---|---|
| UNGA | 25 September, (United States) New York City | |
| EAS (ASEAN+3) | None | Cancelled |
| ASEAN–Japan | None | Cancelled |
| G8 | | 8–10 July, (Italy) L'Aquila |
| G20 | 14–15 November, (United States) Washington, D.C. | 1–2 April, (United Kingdom) London |
