= List of international prime ministerial trips made by Fumio Kishida =

The following is a list of international prime ministerial trips made by Fumio Kishida during his tenure as Prime Minister of Japan.

== Summary ==
The number of visits per country where he has travelled are:

- One visit to: Australia, Canada, Egypt, Germany, Ghana, Kenya, Lithuania, Malaysia, Mozambique, Paraguay, the Philippines, Qatar, Saudi Arabia, Spain, Switzerland, Ukraine, Vatican City, and Vietnam
- Two visits to: Belgium, Brazil, Cambodia, France, Poland, Singapore, Thailand, and the United Arab Emirates
- Three visits to: Indonesia, India, Italy, South Korea, and the United Kingdom
- Eight visits to: the United States.
  World map highlighting countries visited by Fumio Kishida during his premiership. One visit Two visits Three visits Four or more visits Japan

== 2021 ==
No.	Country	Locations	Dates	Details	Image
1	United Kingdom	Glasgow	2 November	Kishida attended the 2021 United Nations Climate Change Conference.	

== 2022 ==
No.	Country	Locations	Dates	Details	Image
2	India	New Delhi	19–20 March	Kishida met with Prime Minister Narendra Modi and attended the India-Japan Economic Forum.	
2	Cambodia	Phnom Penh	20–21 March	Kishida met with Prime Minister Hun Sen.	
3	Belgium	Brussels	24 March	Kishida attended the extraordinary NATO summit to discuss the Russian invasion of Ukraine.	
4	Indonesia	Jakarta	29–30 April	Kishida met with President Joko Widodo.	
4	Vietnam	Hanoi	30 April – 1 May	Kishida met with Prime Minister Phạm Minh Chính, President Nguyễn Xuân Phúc, National Assembly chairman Vương Đình Huệ, and Communist Party General Secretary Nguyễn Phú Trọng.	
4	Thailand	Bangkok	1–2 May	Kishida met with Prime Minister Prayut Chan-o-cha.	
4	Italy	Rome	3–4 May	Kishida met with Prime Minister Mario Draghi.	
4	Vatican City	Apostolic Palace	4 May	Kishida met with Pope Francis, followed by a meeting with Vatican Secretary of State Pietro Parolin.	
4	United Kingdom	London	4–5 May	Kishida met with Prime Minister Boris Johnson.	
5	Singapore	Singapore	10–11 June	Kishida delivered the keynote address at the Shangri-La Dialogue and met with Prime Minister Lee Hsien Loong and President Halimah Yacob.	
6	Germany	Münich; Schloss Elmau	26–28 June	Kishida attended the G7 summit.	
6	Spain	Madrid	28–29 June	Kishida attended the NATO summit.	
7	United States	New York City	31 July – 1 August	Kishida delivered an address at the general debate of the Review Conference of the Treaty on the Non-Proliferation of Nuclear Weapons. He also met with UN Secretary-General António Guterres.	
8	United States	New York City	20–22 September	Kishida met with British Prime Minister Liz Truss and Turkish President Recep Tayyip Erdoğan, afterwards delivering a speech at the general debate of the seventy-seventh session of the United Nations General Assembly. On the following day, he attended the HeForShe summit, met with New Zealander Prime Minister Jacinda Ardern, attended the 10th Friends of the CTBT (Comprehensive Nuclear-Test-Ban Treaty) summit, and met with Finnish President Sauli Niinistö and South Korean President Yoon Suk Yeol. Later met with Philippine President Bongbong Marcos and Iranian President Ebrahim Raisi, attended the 7th Global Fund Replenishment Meeting, and met with German Chancellor Olaf Scholz and US President Joe Biden. On the following day, Kishida met with Ukrainian Prime Minister Denys Shmyhal, rang the closing bell at the New York Stock Exchange, and met with Pakistani Prime Minister Shehbaz Sharif.	
9	Australia	Perth	20–21 October	Kishida met with Prime Minister Anthony Albanese.	
10	Cambodia	Phnom Penh	12–13 November	Kishida attended the ASEAN-related summits, including the ASEAN+3 Summit, ASEAN–Japan Summit, East Asia Summit, and the Second ASEAN Global Dialogue.	
10	Indonesia	Bali	13–16 November	Kishida attended the G20 summit.	
10	Thailand	Bangkok	17–18 November	Kishida attended the APEC summit.	

== 2023 ==
No.	Country	Locations	Dates	Details	Image
11	France	Paris	9 January	Kishida met with President Emmanuel Macron. He also met with Constitutional Council President Laurent Fabius.	
11	Italy	Rome	10 January	Kishida met with Prime Minister Giorgia Meloni.	
11	United Kingdom	London	10–11 January	Kishida met with Prime Minister Rishi Sunak.	
11	Canada	Ottawa	11–12 January	Kishida met with Prime Minister Justin Trudeau.	
11	United States	Washington, D.C.	12–14 January	Kishida met with President Joe Biden and Vice President Kamala Harris. He also gave an address at the Paul H. Nitze School of Advanced International Studies.	
12	India	New Delhi	20 March	Kishida met with Prime Minister Narendra Modi and addressed the Indian Council of World Affairs.	
12	Poland	Rzeszów; Przemyśl; Warsaw	21–22 March	Flew to Rzeszow, then transferred to Przemysl and via train went to Kyiv, Ukraine. Met with President Andrzej Duda and Prime Minister Mateusz Morawiecki after returning to Poland.	
12	Ukraine	Kyiv; Bucha	21 March	Main article: 2023 visit by Fumio Kishida to Ukraine Unannounced visit. Met with President Volodymyr Zelenskyy and First Lady Olena Zelenska at the Mariinskyi Palace.	
13	Egypt	Cairo	29–30 April	Kishida met with President Abdel Fattah el-Sisi.	
13	Ghana	Accra	1 May	Kishida met with President Nana Akufo-Addo.	
13	Kenya	Nairobi	2–3 May	Kishida met with President William Ruto.	
13	Mozambique	Maputo	3–4 May	Kishida met with President Filipe Nyusi.	
13	Singapore	Singapore	5 May	Kishida met with Prime Minister Lee Hsien Loong.	
14	South Korea	Seoul	7–8 May	Kishida met with President Yoon Suk-yeol.	
15	Poland	Warsaw	11 July	Kishida met with Prime Minister Mateusz Morawiecki.	
15	Lithuania	Vilnius	11–12 July	Kishida attended 2023 Vilnius NATO summit.	
15	Belgium	Brussels	12–13 July	Kishida met with Prime Minister Alexander De Croo. He also met with European Council President Charles Michel and European Commission President Ursula von der Leyen.	
16	Saudi Arabia	Jeddah	16 July	Kishida met with King Salman and Crown Prince Mohammed bin Salman.	
16	United Arab Emirates	Abu Dhabi	17 July	Kishida met with President Mohamed bin Zayed Al Nahyan.	
16	Qatar	Doha	18 July	Kishida met with Emir Tamim bin Hamad Al Thani.	
17	United States	Camp David, Maryland	17–18 August	Kishida attended a trilateral meeting with US President Joe Biden and South Korean President Yoon Suk-yeol. The three leaders announced the American–Japanese–Korean trilateral pact.	
18	Indonesia	Jakarta	5–7 September	Kishida attended including the ASEAN+3 Summit, ASEAN–Japan Summit, East Asia Summit, and the Second ASEAN Global Dialogue.	
18	India	New Delhi	8–10 September	Kishida attended the G20 summit.	
19	United States	New York City	19–21 September	Kishida gave speeches at the Commemorative High-Level Event on a Fissile Material Cut-off Treaty and the 2023 SDG Summit, afterwards delivering a speech at the general debate of the seventy-eight session of the United Nations General Assembly. The following day, he delivered a speech at the Global Goalkeepers Award 2023 ceremony, met with Iranian President Ebrahim Raisi, and attended a UN Security Council High Level Open Debate. He later met with Mongolian President Ukhnaagiin Khürelsükh.	
20	Philippines	Manila; Quezon City	3–4 November	Kishida met with President Bongbong Marcos, followed by meetings with Senate President Migz Zubiri and House Speaker Martin Romualdez. He afterwards gave a speech at the joint session of the Congress of the Philippines, making him the first Japanese prime minister to do so. Kishida boarded the Japanese-built BRP Teresa Magbanua docked at the Port of Manila.	
20	Malaysia	Kuala Lumpur	4–5 November	Kishida met with Prime Minister Anwar Ibrahim.	
21	United States	San Francisco	15–17 November	Kishida attended the APEC summit.	
22	United Arab Emirates	Dubai	1–2 December	Kishida attended the 2023 United Nations Climate Change Conference.	

== 2024 ==
No.	Country	Locations	Dates	Details	Image
23	United States	Washington, D.C.; Greensboro; Raleigh	8–11 April	Kishida attended a state dinner hosted by President Joe Biden at the White House. Kishida delivered a joint session of the US Congress and participated in a tri-lateral meeting with President Biden and Filipino President Bongbong Marcos. Kishida visited the Toyota Battery Manufacturing facility in Greensboro, North Carolina. He was also hosted to a luncheon by North Carolina Governor Roy Cooper in Raleigh.	
24	France	Paris	2 May	Kishida met with President Emmanuel Macron and Prime Minister Gabriel Attal.	
24	Brazil	Brasília	3 May	Kishida met with President Luiz Inácio Lula da Silva.	
24	Paraguay	Asunción	3 May	Kishida met with President Santiago Peña.	
24	Brazil	São Paulo	4 May		
25	South Korea	Seoul	26–27 May	Kishida attended the China–Japan–South Korea trilateral summit.	
26	Italy	Apulia	13–15 June	Kishida attended the G7 summit.	
26	Switzerland	Lucerne	15 June	Kishida attended the Global peace summit.	
27	United States	Washington, D.C.	9–11 July	Kishida attended the NATO summit.	
28	South Korea	Seoul	6–7 September	Kishida met with President Yoon Suk-yeol.	
29	United States	Wilmington; New York City	21–23 September	Kishida attended the QUAD summit. On the following day, Kishida met with European Council President Charles Michel and Palauan President Surangel Whipps Jr., afterwards delivering a speech on the UN Summit of the Future. He later met with Mongolian President Ukhnaagiin Khürelsükh, Canadian Prime Minister Justin Trudeau, and UN Secretary General António Guterres. On the following day, Kishida met with Ukrainian President Volodymyr Zelenskyy and NATO Secretary General Jens Stoltenberg.	

== Multilateral meetings ==
Prime Minister Kishida attended the following summits during his prime ministership (2021–2024):

Group	Year			
Group	2021	2022	2023	2024
UNGA		20 September, (United States) New York City	19 September, (United States) New York City	26 September, (United States) New York City
ASEM	26 November, (virtual) (Cambodia) Phnom Penh	None	None	None
APEC	12 November, (virtual) (New Zealand) Auckland	18–19 November, (Thailand) Bangkok	15–17 November, (United States) San Francisco	
EAS (ASEAN+3)	26–27 October, (virtual) (Brunei) Bandar Seri Begawan	11–13 November, (Cambodia) Phnom Penh	5–7 September, (Indonesia) Jakarta	
ASEAN–Japan	27 October, (virtual) (Brunei) Bandar Seri Begawan	12 November, (Cambodia) Phnom Penh	6 September, (Indonesia) Jakarta	
G7		26–28 June, (Germany) Schloss Elmau	19–21 May, (Japan) Hiroshima	13–15 June, (Italy) Apulia
G20	30–31 October,^{[a]} (Italy) Rome	15–16 November, (Indonesia) Bali	9–10 September, (India) New Delhi	
NATO		24 March,^{[b]} (Belgium) Brussels	11–12 July,^{[b]} (Lithuania) Vilnius	9–11 July,^{[b]} (United States) Washington, D.C.
NATO		28–30 June,^{[b]} (Spain) Madrid	11–12 July,^{[b]} (Lithuania) Vilnius	9–11 July,^{[b]} (United States) Washington, D.C.
UNCCC	2 November, (United Kingdom) Glasgow	11 November, (Egypt) Sharm el-Sheikh	1–2 December, (United Arab Emirates) Dubai	
QUAD		24 May, (Japan) Tokyo	20 May, (Japan) Hiroshima	21 September, (United States) Wilmington
China–Japan–Korea	None	None	None	26–27 May, (South Korea) Seoul
Others	None	None	JAROKUS; 18 August, (United States) Camp David	Global Peace Summit; 15–16 June, (Switzerland) Lucerne
Others	None	None	ASEAN–Japan Friendship and Cooperation Commemorative Summit; 16–18 December, Tokyo	Global Peace Summit; 15–16 June, (Switzerland) Lucerne
██ = Future event ██ = Did not attend^aToshimitsu Motegi attended in the prime minister's place.^bJapan was not a full member.

== See also ==
- Foreign relations of Japan
- List of international trips made by prime ministers of Japan
