= List of international prime ministerial trips made by Sanae Takaichi =

This is the list of international prime ministerial trips made by Sanae Takaichi, who has served as Prime Minister of Japan since 21 October 2025. Sanae Takaichi has made 10 international trips to 11 countries during her premiership.

== Summary ==
The number of visits per country where she has travelled are:

- One visit to: Australia, China, France, India, Italy, Malaysia, the Philippines, South Africa, the United Kingdom, and Vietnam
- Two visits to: South Korea and the United States

World map highlighting countries visited by Sanae Takaichi during her premiership.(as of May 2026) One visit Two visits Japan

== 2025 ==
No.	Country	Locations	Dates	Details	Image
1	Malaysia	Kuala Lumpur	26–28 October	Takaichi attended the ASEAN-related summits, including the ASEAN+3 Summit, ASEAN–Japan Summit, East Asia Summit, and the Second ASEAN Global Dialogue.	
2	South Korea	Gyeongju	30 October – 1 November	Takaichi attended the APEC summit.	
3	South Africa	Johannesburg	22–23 November	Takaichi attended the G20 summit.	

== 2026 ==
No.	Country	Locations	Dates	Details	Image
4	United States	Washington, D.C.	18–20 March	Takaichi met with President Donald Trump.	
5	Vietnam	Hanoi	1–3 May	Takaichi met with General Secretary of the Communist Party and President To Lam and Prime Minister Lê Minh Hưng. They discussed strengthening the Japan-Vietnam “Comprehensive Strategic Partnership”.	
5	Australia	Canberra, Sydney	3–5 May	Takaichi met with Prime Minister Anthony Albanese. They held a Japan-Australia Summit Meeting. As this year marks the 50th Anniversary of the Signing of the Basic Treaty of Friendship and Cooperation between Japan and Australia, the two leaders discussed further strengthening cooperation in order to elevate the "Special Strategic Partnership" to new heights.	
6	South Korea	Andong	19–20 May	Takaichi met with President Lee Jae Myung as part of ongoing shuttle diplomacy between Japan and South Korea.	
7	United Kingdom	London	14 June	Takaichi met with Prime Minister Keir Starmer to discuss security issues, including the Global Combat Air Programme.	
7	Italy	Rome	15 June	Takaichi met with Prime Minister Giorgia Meloni to discuss security issues, including the Global Combat Air Programme.	
7	France	Évian-les-Bains	15–17 June	Takaichi attended the G7 summit.	
8	India	New Delhi	1–3 July	Takaichi met with Prime Minister Narendra Modi to discuss cooperation initiatives with India in economic security and other areas.	
9	United States	New York City	22 September	Takaichi attended the general debate of the eighty-first session of the United Nations General Assembly and then had a meeting with President Donald Trump.	
10	Philippines	Metro Manila	16–18 November	Takaichi attended the 21st East Asia Summit and the Japan–ASEAN Summit. She also met with President Bongbong Marcos and paid her respects at the Libingan ng mga Bayani.	
10	China	Shenzhen	18–19 November	Takaichi attended the 33rd APEC Economic Leaders' Meeting.	

== Future trips ==
The following international trips are scheduled to be made by Sanae Takaichi during 2026:

Country	Locations	Dates	Details
United States	Miami	14–15 December	Takaichi is scheduled to attend the G20 summit.
India	New Delhi	TBA	Takaichi is scheduled to attend the QUAD Summit.
Indonesia	Jakarta	TBA	Takaichi is scheduled to meet with President Prabowo Subianto.
Thailand	Bangkok	TBA	Takaichi is scheduled to meet with Prime Minister Anutin Charnvirakul.

== Multilateral meetings ==
Prime Minister Takaichi is scheduled to attend the following summits during her prime ministership:

Group	Year		
Group	2025	2026	2027
UNGA		22 September, (United States) New York City	September, (United States) New York City
ASEM	None	None	TBA
APEC	31 October – 1 November, (South Korea) Gyeongju	18–19 November, (China) Shenzhen	TBD, Vietnam
EAS (ASEAN+3)	26–28 October, (Malaysia) Kuala Lumpur	16–18 November, (Philippines) Pasay	TBA
ASEAN–Japan	26 October, (Malaysia) Kuala Lumpur	16 November, (Philippines) Pasay	TBA
G7		15–17 June, (France) Évian-les-Bains	TBD, United States
G20	22–23 November, (South Africa) Johannesburg	14–15 December, (United States) Miami	TBD, United Kingdom
QUAD	None	TBD, (India) New Delhi	TBA
China–Japan–Korea	None	TBA	TBA
██ = Future event ██ = Did not attend

== See also ==
- Foreign relations of Japan
- List of international trips made by prime ministers of Japan
