= List of international prime ministerial trips made by Yoshihide Suga =

The following is a list of international prime ministerial trips made by Yoshihide Suga during his tenure as Prime Minister of Japan.

== Summary ==
The number of visits per country where he has travelled are:

- One visit to: Indonesia, United Kingdom, Vietnam
- Two visit to: United States

== 2020 ==
No.	Country	Locations	Dates	Details	Image
1	Vietnam	Hanoi	19 October	Suga met with Prime Minister Nguyễn Xuân Phúc, President and Communist Party General Secretary Nguyễn Phú Trọng, and National Assembly chairwoman Nguyễn Thị Kim Ngân.	
1	Indonesia	Jakarta	20–21 October	Suga met with President Joko Widodo.	

== 2021 ==
No.	Country	Locations	Dates	Details	Image
2	United States	Washington, D.C.	16 April	Suga met with President Joe Biden. Suga was the first foreign leader to visit Biden at the White House.	
3	United Kingdom	Carbis Bay	10–13 June	Suga attended the G7 summit.	
4	United States	New York City; Washington, D.C.	24–27 September	Suga attended the General debate of the seventy-sixth session of the United Nations General Assembly and met with President Joe Biden, Indian Prime Minister Narendra Modi, and Australian Prime Minister Scott Morrison to discuss in QUAD summit about COVID-19 vaccination efforts, climate change, economic security, Indo-Pacific security.	

== Multilateral meetings ==
Prime Minister Suga attended the following summits during his prime ministership (2020–2021):

Group	Year	
Group	2020	2021
UNGA	25 September, (virtual) (United States) New York City	24 September, (United States) New York City
ASEM	None	
APEC	20 November, (virtual) (Malaysia) Kuala Lumpur	
EAS (ASEAN)	14 November, (virtual) (Vietnam) Hanoi	
G7		11–13 June, (United Kingdom) Carbis Bay
G20	21–22 November, (virtual) (Saudi Arabia) Riyadh	
QUAD		24 September (United States) Washington
██ = Virtual event

== See also ==
- Foreign relations of Japan
- List of international trips made by prime ministers of Japan
