= List of international prime ministerial trips made by Yoshihiko Noda =

The following is a list of international prime ministerial trips made by Yoshihiko Noda during his tenure as the Prime Minister of Japan.

== Summary ==
The number of visits per country where he has travelled are:

- One visit to: Cambodia, France, India, Indonesia, Laos, Mexico, Russia
- Two visits to: China, South Korea
- Five visits to: the United States

== 2011 ==
No.	Country	Locations	Dates	Details
1	United States	New York City	20–22 September	Prime Minister Noda made his first overseas visit since taking office to attend the 66th Session of the United Nations General Assembly. He delivered an address during the General Debate and attended a high-level meeting on nuclear safety and security. He also held bilateral meetings with United States President Barack Obama, South Korean President Lee Myung-bak, Indian Prime Minister Manmohan Singh, and other world leaders. During his visit, Noda expressed gratitude for the international assistance Japan had received following the 2011 Tōhoku earthquake and tsunami and discussed Japan's recovery and reconstruction efforts.
2	South Korea	Seoul	18–19 October	Prime Minister Noda made his first official bilateral overseas visit as Prime Minister to the Republic of Korea. He visited the Seoul National Cemetery and held a summit meeting with South Korean President Lee Myung-bak. The two leaders discussed bilateral relations, including historical issues, economic cooperation, and regional security. They also exchanged views on North Korea's nuclear and missile programmes and the importance of strengthening cooperation between Japan and South Korea.
3	France	Cannes	3–4 November	Prime Minister Noda attended the G20 Cannes Summit. He participated in discussions concerning the global economy, the European sovereign-debt crisis, international financial stability, and development. He also held bilateral meetings with several world leaders, including German Chancellor Angela Merkel, and met representatives of international organisations and business leaders. Japan's economic recovery following the Great East Japan Earthquake and the country's commitment to international economic cooperation were among the subjects discussed.
4	United States	Honolulu	11–13 November	Prime Minister Noda attended the APEC Economic Leaders' Meeting in Honolulu, Hawaii. He participated in discussions on regional economic integration, trade liberalisation, and the establishment of a Free Trade Area of the Asia-Pacific. He also attended meetings with other APEC leaders and held bilateral discussions with United States President Barack Obama. During his visit, Noda announced Japan's intention to begin consultations on joining the Trans-Pacific Partnership negotiations.
5	Indonesia	Bali	18–19 November	Prime Minister Noda attended the ASEAN-related summit meetings in Bali, including the 14th ASEAN–Japan Summit, the 14th ASEAN Plus Three Summit, and the Sixth East Asia Summit. He participated in discussions on regional economic integration, financial cooperation, disaster management, and regional security. He also held bilateral meetings with Indonesian President Susilo Bambang Yudhoyono, Thai Prime Minister Yingluck Shinawatra, and Myanmar President Thein Sein. During the meetings, Noda reaffirmed Japan's commitment to strengthening relations with Southeast Asian countries and supporting regional development and recovery from natural disasters.
6	China	Beijing	25–26 December	Prime Minister Noda made an official visit to China, where he held summit talks with Chinese President Hu Jintao and Premier Wen Jiabao. The discussions covered bilateral relations, regional security, economic cooperation, and the situation on the Korean Peninsula. Both countries also discussed strengthening economic ties, including cooperation in trade, investment, and environmental protection. Noda additionally met with Wu Bangguo, Chairman of the Standing Committee of the National People's Congress.
7	India	New Delhi	27–29 December	Prime Minister Noda made a state visit to India, where he met with Indian Prime Minister Manmohan Singh. He also visited Raj Ghat, the memorial to Mahatma Gandhi, delivered an address at the Indian Council of World Affairs, and attended meetings with Indian business representatives. During the summit meeting, the two leaders discussed strengthening bilateral relations in political, security, and economic fields. They also agreed to expand cooperation in maritime security, infrastructure development, and civil nuclear energy, and discussed the establishment of a comprehensive economic partnership between the two countries.

== 2012 ==
No.	Country	Locations	Dates	Details
8	South Korea	Seoul	27 March	Prime Minister Noda attended the 2012 Nuclear Security Summit in Seoul. He participated in the plenary session and working lunch, where he addressed the international community on nuclear security and the relationship between nuclear safety and security. He also discussed lessons learned from the Fukushima Daiichi nuclear disaster and the importance of international cooperation in preventing nuclear terrorism. The summit was attended by representatives of 53 countries and four international organisations.
9	United States	Washington, D.C.	29 April–1 May	Prime Minister Noda made an official visit to the United States and held a summit meeting with President Barack Obama at the White House. The two leaders discussed the Japan–United States alliance, regional security, economic cooperation, and the situation in the Asia-Pacific region. They issued a joint statement reaffirming the importance of the bilateral alliance and agreed to continue cooperation on security and economic matters, including the realignment of United States forces in Japan and the relocation of Marine Corps Air Station Futenma. They also discussed Japan's participation in regional economic negotiations.
10	China	Beijing	13–14 May	Prime Minister Noda attended the fifth China–Japan–South Korea trilateral summit in Beijing. He held talks with Chinese Premier Wen Jiabao and South Korean President Lee Myung-bak. The three leaders discussed regional economic cooperation, disaster management, environmental protection, and the promotion of a trilateral investment agreement. They also reaffirmed the importance of advancing negotiations towards a trilateral free trade agreement and strengthening cooperation in East Asia.
11	United States	Camp David	18–19 May	Prime Minister Noda attended the G8 Camp David Summit. He participated in discussions on the global economy, energy and climate change, food security, Afghanistan, and the political situation in the Middle East and North Africa. He also attended a Japan–EU summit meeting with European Council President Herman Van Rompuy and European Commission President José Manuel Barroso. Noda held a bilateral meeting with United States President Barack Obama and met with French President François Hollande.
12	Mexico	Los Cabos	17–19 June	Prime Minister Noda attended the G20 Los Cabos Summit. He participated in discussions on the global economy, financial stability, sustainable development, and international trade. He also held bilateral meetings with Russian President Vladimir Putin and Indonesian President Susilo Bambang Yudhoyono. During the summit, Noda stressed the importance of international cooperation in addressing the European debt crisis and supporting global economic growth.
13	Russia	Vladivostok	7–9 September	Prime Minister Noda attended the APEC Economic Leaders' Meeting in Vladivostok. He participated in discussions on trade and investment liberalisation, regional economic integration, food security, supply chains, and innovative growth. He also held a bilateral summit meeting with Russian President Vladimir Putin, during which the two leaders discussed Japan-Russia relations and the territorial dispute over the Northern Territories. Noda emphasised the importance of resolving the territorial issue through continued diplomatic dialogue.
14	United States	New York City	24–26 September	Prime Minister Noda attended the 67th Session of the United Nations General Assembly. He delivered an address during the General Debate and held meetings with United Nations Secretary-General Ban Ki-moon and several other world leaders. His address focused on international cooperation, nuclear disarmament and non-proliferation, and the importance of the rule of law in international relations. He also discussed Japan's recovery from the Great East Japan Earthquake and the country's efforts to strengthen international cooperation.
15	Laos	Vientiane	4–6 November	Prime Minister Noda visited Laos to attend the 9th Asia-Europe Meeting (ASEM9). He participated in discussions on the global economy, financial issues, regional cooperation, and international affairs. He also held a bilateral meeting with Lao Prime Minister Thongsing Thammavong, during which the two leaders discussed strengthening Japan-Laos relations, infrastructure development, and economic cooperation. Noda welcomed the opportunity to visit Laos and reaffirmed Japan's support for the country's development.
16	Cambodia	Phnom Penh	18–20 November	Prime Minister Noda attended the ASEAN-related summit meetings in Phnom Penh, including the 15th ASEAN Plus Three Summit, the 15th ASEAN–Japan Summit, and the Seventh East Asia Summit. He participated in discussions on regional economic integration, financial cooperation, maritime security, and the future development of East Asia. He also held bilateral meetings with leaders from Southeast Asian countries, reaffirming Japan's commitment to strengthening its diplomatic and economic relationships with the region. Noda emphasised Japan's continued support for ASEAN integration and regional stability.

== Multilateral meetings ==
Prime Minister Noda attended the following summits during his prime ministership (2011–2012):

Group	Year	
Group	2011	2012
UNGA	20–23 September, (United States) New York City	24–26 September, (United States) New York City
EAS (ASEAN+3)	18–19 November, (Indonesia) Bali	19–20 November, (Cambodia) Phnom Penh
ASEAN–Japan	18 November, (Indonesia) Bali	19 November, (Cambodia) Phnom Penh
G8		18–19 May, (United States) Camp David
G-20	3–4 November, (France) Cannes	18–19 June, (Mexico) Los Cabos
NSS		26–27 March, (South Korea) Seoul
APEC	12–13 November, (United States) Honolulu	8–9 September, (Russia) Vladivostok

== See also ==
- Foreign relations of Japan
- List of international trips made by prime ministers of Japan
