= List of international prime ministerial trips made by Naoto Kan =

The following is a list of international prime ministerial trips made by Naoto Kan during his tenure as the Prime Minister of Japan.

== Summary ==
The number of visits per country where he travelled are:

- Two visits to: Belgium
- One visit to: Canada, France, South Korea, Switzerland, the United States, Vietnam

== 2010 ==
No.	Country	Locations	Dates	Details
1	Canada	Huntsville, Toronto	25–27 June	Prime Minister Kan attended the G8 Muskoka Summit in Huntsville, where he held bilateral meetings with Canadian Prime Minister Stephen Harper and German Chancellor Angela Merkel. He participated in discussions on the global economy, development, and international security. He subsequently travelled to Toronto to attend the G20 Toronto Summit, where he participated in plenary sessions and bilateral meetings with several world leaders, including Chinese President Hu Jintao, Vietnamese Prime Minister Nguyễn Tấn Dũng, Indian Prime Minister Manmohan Singh, Indonesian President Susilo Bambang Yudhoyono, and United States President Barack Obama.
2	United States	New York City	22–24 September	Prime Minister Kan visited New York to attend the 65th Session of the United Nations General Assembly. He participated in the High-Level Meeting on Small Island Developing States, delivered an address during the General Debate, and held bilateral talks with Mongolian Prime Minister Sükhbaataryn Batbold and United Nations Secretary-General Ban Ki-moon. He also addressed international efforts towards nuclear disarmament and the goal of achieving a world without nuclear weapons.
3	Belgium	Brussels	3–4 October	Prime Minister Kan attended the Eighth Asia–Europe Meeting. Before the summit, he held bilateral meetings with Australian Prime Minister Julia Gillard, South Korean President Lee Myung-bak, and Vietnamese Prime Minister Nguyễn Tấn Dũng. He also met Belgian King Albert II at the Royal Palace of Brussels. During the summit, he participated in discussions concerning global economic governance and international cooperation between Asian and European countries.
4	Vietnam	Hanoi	29–31 October	Prime Minister Kan attended the ASEAN-related summit meetings in Hanoi, including the Japan–ASEAN Summit, ASEAN Plus Three, and the East Asia Summit. He announced Japan's support for strengthening ASEAN connectivity and discussed regional economic and financial cooperation. He subsequently held a bilateral summit meeting with Vietnamese Prime Minister Nguyễn Tấn Dũng, during which the two leaders signed a joint statement and held a joint press conference. Kan also paid tribute at the National Hero Memorial and the Ho Chi Minh Mausoleum and met with Communist Party General Secretary Nông Đức Mạnh.
5	South Korea	Seoul	11–12 November	Prime Minister Kan attended the G20 Seoul Summit. He participated in the G20 Business Summit and held discussions with world leaders on international economic cooperation. During the summit, he also met with European Council President Herman Van Rompuy and European Commission President José Manuel Barroso for a Japan–EU Summit meeting. Discussions included reform of International Monetary Fund governance, financial regulation, and strengthening Japan–EU relations in political, economic, and cultural fields.

== 2011 ==
No.	Country	Locations	Dates	Details
1	Switzerland	Davos	29 January	Prime Minister Kan attended the World Economic Forum's 2011 Annual Meeting in Davos. He exchanged views with international experts, delivered a special message entitled "Opening Japan and Reinventing KIZUNA," and addressed participants during the Japan Session. His speech focused on Japan's economic revitalization, international cooperation, and strengthening relationships with the international community.
2	France	Paris, Deauville	24–27 May	Prime Minister Kan visited France ahead of the G8 Deauville Summit. In Paris, he met with French Prime Minister François Fillon and President Nicolas Sarkozy, discussing bilateral relations, nuclear safety following the Fukushima Daiichi nuclear disaster, renewable energy, and economic cooperation. He subsequently attended the G8 Summit in Deauville, where he participated in discussions on international affairs, the global economy, and the situation in the Middle East and North Africa. He also addressed the consequences of the Great East Japan Earthquake and the importance of international solidarity and cooperation.
3	Belgium	Brussels	28 May	Prime Minister Kan visited Brussels to attend the Japan–EU Summit Meeting. He held talks with European Council President Herman Van Rompuy and European Commission President José Manuel Barroso, discussing the Japan–EU Economic Partnership Agreement (EPA) and strengthening bilateral cooperation. Following the meeting, he attended a working lunch and held a joint press conference with the European representatives.

== Multilateral meetings ==
Prime Minister Kan attended the following summits during his prime ministership (2010–2011):

Group	Year	
Group	2010	2011
UNGA	22–24 September, (United States) New York City	
EAS (ASEAN+3)	29–31 October, (Vietnam) Hanoi	
ASEAN–Japan	29 October, (Vietnam) Hanoi	
G8	25–26 June, (Canada) Huntsville	26–27 May, Deauville
G-20	26–27 June, (Canada) Toronto	
G-20	11–12 November, (South Korea) Seoul	
