= List of international prime ministerial trips made by Yasuo Fukuda =

The following is a list of international prime ministerial trips made by Yasuo Fukuda during his tenure as the prime minister of Japan.

== Summary ==
The number of visits per country where he has travelled are:

- Two visits to: China
- One visit to: Germany, Italy, Russia, Singapore, South Korea, Switzerland, the United Kingdom, the United States

== 2007 ==
No.	Country	Locations	Dates	Details
1	United States	Washington, D.C.	15–17 November	First overseas trip as prime minister. Met with U.S. President George W. Bush at the White House on 16 November, where the two leaders reaffirmed the Japan–U.S. alliance and discussed the North Korean nuclear issue and the abduction issue of Japanese people done by the North Korean Government. Fukuda pledged to work for passage of a bill to resume the Japan Maritime Self-Defense Force's refuelling mission in the Indian Ocean. He also laid a wreath at Arlington National Cemetery.
2	Singapore	Singapore	19–20 November	Attended the Third East Asia Summit and the Japan–ASEAN summit, where he welcomed the conclusion of negotiations on the ASEAN–Japan Comprehensive Economic Partnership Agreement. Fukuda signed the Singapore Declaration on Climate Change, Energy and the Environment with other leaders. He also held bilateral talks with Singaporean prime minister Lee Hsien Loong, Indian prime minister Manmohan Singh and Burmese prime minister Thein Sein, urging the latter to advance democratisation in Myanmar.
3	China	Beijing, Tianjin, Qufu	27–30 December	Official visit, his first to China as prime minister. In Beijing he held talks with Premier Wen Jiabao and met President Hu Jintao and Wu Bangguo, chairman of the Standing Committee of the National People's Congress. Fukuda delivered a speech at Peking University on 28 December, and the two sides agreed that Hu would visit Japan around the cherry blossom season in 2008. He later played catch with Wen, visited an elementary school in Beijing, toured an automobile factory in Tianjin, and visited the Temple of Confucius in Qufu, Shandong.

== 2008 ==
No.	Country	Locations	Dates	Details
1	Switzerland	Davos	26 January	Attended the World Economic Forum annual meeting and delivered a special speech on the world economy, climate change, and development in Africa. Fukuda announced the "Cool Earth Promotion Programme", including a proposed global target of a 30 percent improvement in energy efficiency by 2020 and a new financial mechanism of about US$10 billion for developing countries. He also met Tony Blair and Swiss president Pascal Couchepin.
2	South Korea	Seoul	24–25 February	Attended the inauguration of Lee Myung-bak as president of South Korea and held the first Japan–South Korea summit with him afterwards. The two leaders agreed to pursue "shuttle diplomacy", to cooperate on North Korean denuclearisation, and to resume stalled talks on an economic partnership agreement. Fukuda also visited the Cheonggyecheon stream.
3	Russia	Moscow	25–27 April	Official visit. Met with Russian President Vladimir Putin and President-elect Dmitry Medvedev on 26 April. The discussions focused on strengthening Japan–Russia relations, economic and energy cooperation, environmental protection, preparations for the upcoming 34th G8 summit, and the longstanding dispute over the Northern Territories. The two leaders agreed to accelerate negotiations toward resolving the territorial dispute and to expand bilateral cooperation, including a joint natural gas exploration project in Eastern Siberia.
3	Germany	Berlin	1 June	First stop of a three-nation European tour. Met Chancellor Angela Merkel at the Federal Chancellery and agreed to coordinate ahead of the 34th G8 summit in Tōyako, Hokkaido, in July. Fukuda also said Japan would host a breakfast with leaders of five emerging economies at the summit, continuing the Heiligendamm Process.
4	United Kingdom	London	2 June	Met Prime Minister Gordon Brown. The two leaders agreed that the international community should jointly address rising oil and commodity prices and food issues, and that the G8 summit should send a strong message on climate change. They also discussed United Nations Security Council reform and the results of the Tokyo International Conference on African Development.
5	Italy	Rome	3–4 June	Attended the Food and Agriculture Organization's High-Level Conference on World Food Security, where he announced US$100 million in emergency food aid. On the sidelines he met French president Nicolas Sarkozy, Italian prime minister Silvio Berlusconi and FAO director-general Jacques Diouf, and on 4 June held talks with UN secretary-general Ban Ki-moon and Egyptian president Hosni Mubarak.
8	China	Beijing	8 August	Attended the opening ceremony of the 2008 Summer Olympics in Beijing. Fukuda met Chinese President Hu Jintao at the Great Hall of the People, where they discussed bilateral relations and China's preparations for the Olympic Games. Fukuda also met Premier Wen Jiabao during his visit and expressed support for the successful hosting of the Olympics.

== Multilateral meetings ==
Prime Minister Fukuda attended the following summits during his prime ministership (2007–2008):

Group	Year	
Group	2007	2008
EAS (ASEAN+3)	21 November, Singapore	None
ASEAN–Japan	21 November, Singapore	None
G8		7–9 July, (Japan) Tōyako
