= Sixty-third session of the United Nations General Assembly =

63rd session of the United Nations General Assembly
- 16 September 2008 – 14 September 2009 63rd session 63rd general debate
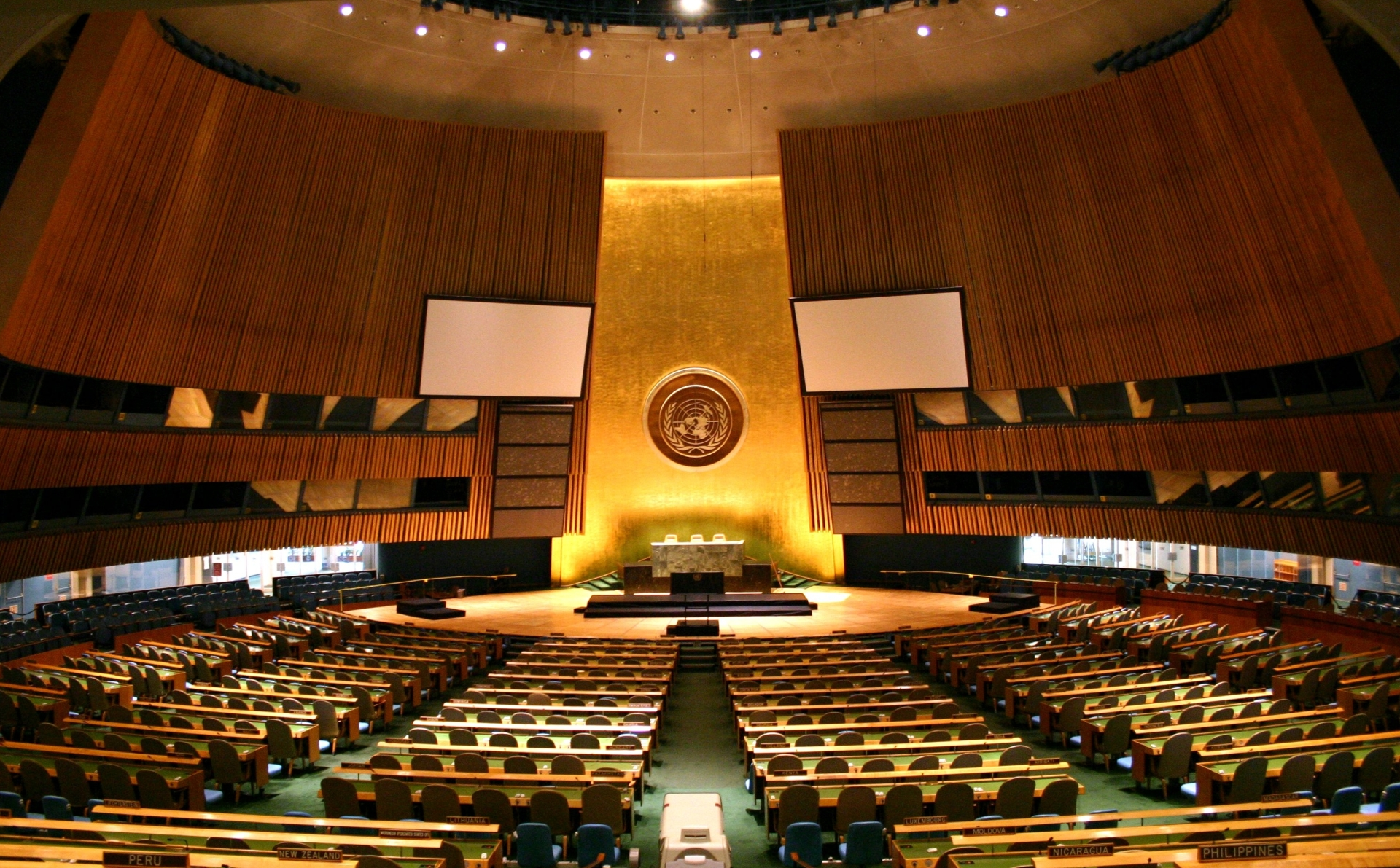
- General Assembly Hall at United Nations Headquarters, New York City
- Host country: United Nations
- Cities: New York City, United States
- Venues: General Assembly Hall at the United Nations Headquarters
- Participants: United Nations Member States
- President: Miguel d'Escoto Brockmann
- Secretary-General: Ban Ki-moon
- Website: www.un.org/en/ga/63/

The 63rd session of the United Nations General Assembly was the session of the United Nations General Assembly that ran from 16 September 2008 to 14 September 2009.

The theme for the 63rd Session was "The impact of the global food crisis on poverty and hunger in the world as well as the need to democratize the United Nations."

== Organisation ==
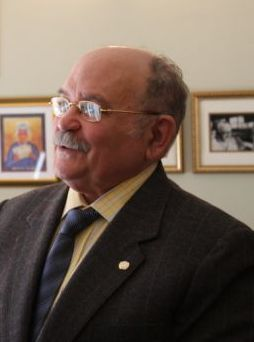
President of the 63rd Session, Miguel d'Escoto Brockmann

=== President ===
Nicaraguan diplomat and politician Miguel d'Escoto Brockmann was elected by acclimation to the position of President of the General Assembly on 4 June 2008. At the time of his election, d'Escoto Brockmann was serving as Senior Adviser on Foreign Affairs to President Daniel Ortega of Nicaragua.

In his first speech as President-elect of the General Assembly, d'Escoto Brockmann laid out some of his priorities for the session. He primarily called for unity within the United Nations, as well as between its Member States. He called for unity to combat hunger and poverty, as well as in the struggle to preserve the world's indispensable biodiversity and cultural diversity. Other priorities for d'Escoto Brockmann in the 63rd Session included:

- The Democratisation of the United Nations
- Climate change, as well as the energy crisis
- The fight against terrorism in all its forms
- Preserving human rights, especially the rights of women and children
- Disarmament and nuclear control

=== Vice-Presidents ===
The following were appointed to be the Session's vice-presidents on 4 June 2008:

The five permanent members of the Security Council:

- China
- France
- Russia
- United Kingdom of Great Britain and Northern Ireland
- United States of America

As well as the following nations:

- Afghanistan
- Bolivia (Plurinational State of)
- Cameroon
- Egypt
- Jamaica
- Kyrgyzstan
- Mongolia
- Myanmar
- Namibia
- Niger
- Republic of Moldova
- Portugal
- Rwanda
- Solomon Islands
- Spain
- Togo

=== Committees ===
First Committee (Disarmament and International Security)
Name	Country	Position
H.E. Marco Antonio Suazo	Honduras	Chairperson
Martin Zvachula	Federated States of Micronesia	Vice-Chair
Ivan Mutavdžić	Croatia	Vice-Chair
Miguel Graça	Portugal	Vice-Chair
Coly Seck	Senegal	Rapporteur

Second Committee (Economic and Financial)
Name	Country	Position
H.E. Uche Joy Ogwu	Nigeria	Chairperson
Andrei Metelitsa	Belarus	Vice-Chair
Troy Torrington	Guyana	Vice-Chair
Martin Hoppe	Germany	Vice-Chair
Awsan Al-Aud	Yemen	Rapporteur

Third Committee (Social, Humanitarian and Cultural)
Name	Country	Position
H.E. Frank Majoor	Netherlands	Chairperson
Divina Adjoa Seanedzu	Ghana	Vice-Chair
Ara Margarian	Armenia	Vice-Chair
Julio Peralta	Paraguay	Vice-Chair
Khalid Alwafi	Saudi Arabia	Rapporteur

Fourth Committee (Special Political and Decolonization)
Name	Country	Position
H.E. Jorge Arguello	Argentina	Chairperson
Emr Elsherbini	Egypt	Vice-Chair
Alexandru Cujba	Republic of Moldova	Vice-Chair
Elmer Cato	Philippines	Vice-Chair
Paulá Parviainen	Finland	Rapporteur

Fifth Committee (Administrative and Budgetary)
Name	Country	Position
H.E. Gabor Brodi	Hungary	Chairperson
Olivio Fermín	Dominican Republic	Vice-Chair
Mohamed Yousif Ibrahim Abdelmannan	Sudan	Vice-Chair
Henric Rasbrant	Sweden	Vice-Chair
Patrick Chuasoto	Philippines	Rapporteur

Sixth Committee (Legal)
Name	Country	Position
H.E. Hamid Al Bayati	Iraq	Chairperson
El-Hadj Lamine	Algeria	Vice-Chair
Ana Cristina Rodríguez-Pineda	Guatemala	Vice-Chair
Scott Sheeran	New Zealand	Vice-Chair
Marko Rakovec	Slovenia	Rapporteur

=== Seat allocation ===
As is tradition, before each session of the General Assembly, the Secretary-General draws lots to determine which Member State will occupy the first seat in the General Assembly Hall for the Session, with other Member States following according to the English translation of their name. For the 65th Session, Barbados was chosen to take the first seat of the General Assembly Chamber.

=== General debate ===
The General Debate of the 63rd Session was held between 23 & 29 September 2008, with the exception of the intervening Sunday. At the General debate, Member States have the opportunity to lay out the issues that are most concerning to them, as well as their hopes as to what the General Assembly will do during the Session.

The order of speakers is given first to Member States, then Observer States and supranational bodies. Speakers are put on a speaking list in the order of their request, with special consideration for ministers and other government officials of similar or higher rank. According to the rules in place for the General Debate, the statements should be in one of the United Nations official languages of Arabic, Chinese, English, French, Russian or Spanish, and will be translated by the United Nations translators.

== Elections ==
=== Security Council ===
On 17 October 2008, the General Assembly elected 5 non-permanent members to the Security Council for two-year terms beginning on 1 January 2009. The five elected members were: Austria, Japan, Mexico, Turkey and Uganda. They filled the seats that were vacated by Belgium, Indonesia, Italy, Panama and South Africa.

=== Economic and Social Council ===
On 22 October 2008, the General Assembly elected 18 members to the Economic and Social Council to serve three-year terms beginning 1 January 2009. The elected members were: Côte d’Ivoire, Guatemala, Guinea-Bissau, Estonia, France, Germany, Greece, India, Japan, Liechtenstein, Mauritius, Morocco, Namibia, Peru, Portugal, Saint Kitts and Nevis, Saudi Arabia and Venezuela.

The 18 outgoing members were: Angola, Austria, Benin, Cuba, Czech Republic, France, Greece, Guinea-Bissau, Guyana, Haiti, Japan, Liechtenstein, Madagascar, Mauritania, Paraguay, Portugal, Saudi Arabia and Sri Lanka.

Prior to the election, the General Assembly approved a request from Iceland to relinquish its WEOG Council seat on 31 December 2008. Norway was then elected to fill the seat for a one-year term beginning 1 January 2009.

=== International Court of Justice ===
On 6 November 2008, the General Assembly elected five judges to sit on the International Court of Justice for nine-year terms beginning 6 February 2009. The five elected judges were:

- Ronny Abraham of France
- Awn Shawkat Al-Khasawneh of Jordan
- Antônio Augusto Cançado Trindade of Brazil
- Christopher John Greenwood of the United Kingdom of Great Britain and Northern Ireland
- Abdulqawi Ahmed Yusuf of Somalia

Judges Abraham and Al-Khasawneh were both re-elected, while Cançado Trindade, Greenwood and Yusuf were elected to the court for the first time.

=== Human Rights Council ===
On 12 May 2009, the General Assembly elected 18 members to sit on the Human Rights Council for three-year terms starting 19 June 2009. Five of these were elected to sit on the council for the first time: Belgium, Hungary, Kyrgyzstan, Norway and the United States of America, while the other 13 members were all re-elected: Bangladesh, Cameroon, China, Cuba, Djibouti, Jordan, Mauritius, Mexico, Nigeria, Russian Federation, Saudi Arabia, Senegal and Uruguay.

== See also ==
- List of UN General Assembly sessions
- List of General debates of the United Nations General Assembly
