= General debate of the sixty-third session of the United Nations General Assembly =

United Nations General assembly debate

- 23 – 29 September 2008 63rd session 63rd general debate

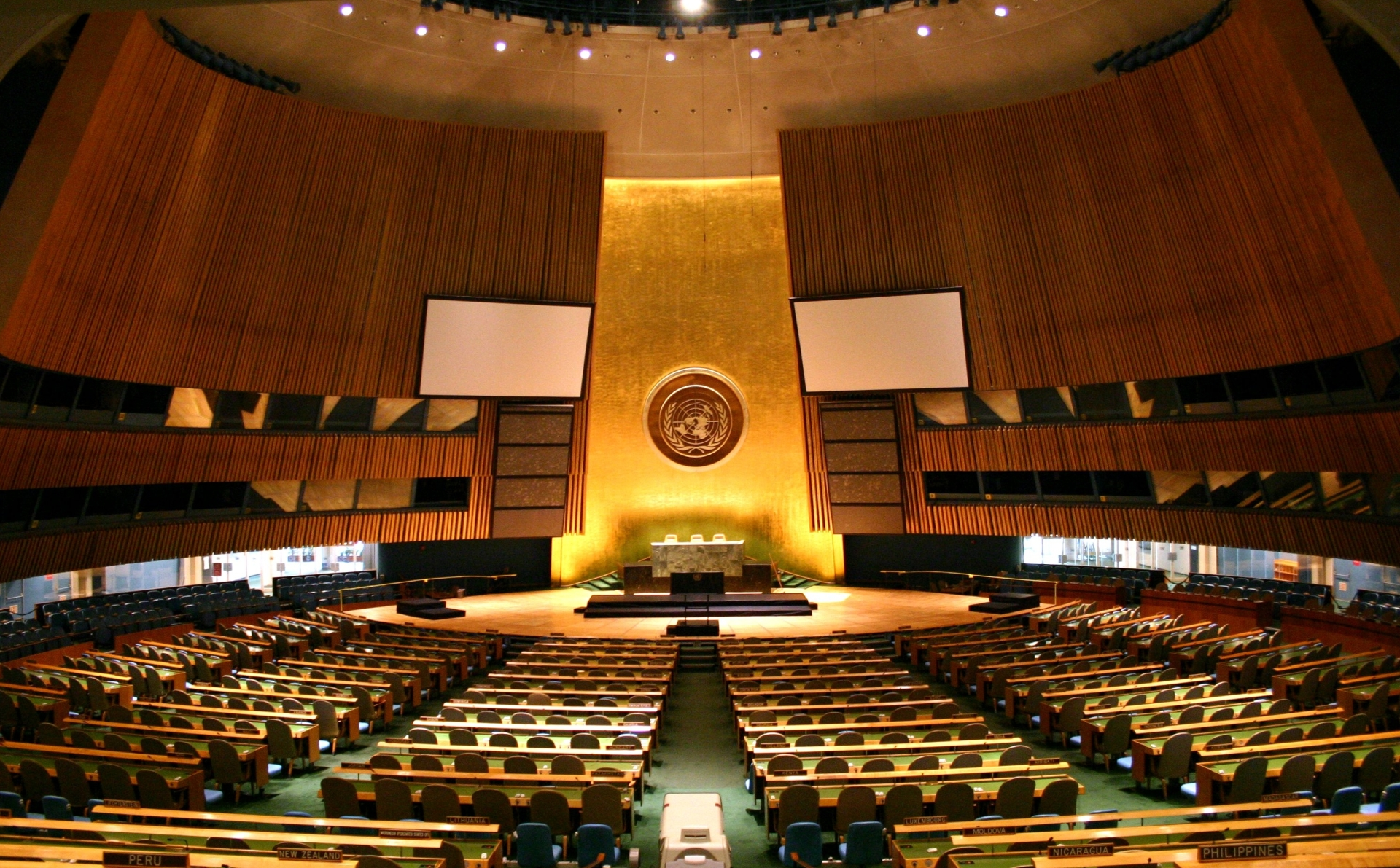
- General Assembly Hall at United Nations Headquarters, New York City
- Host country: United Nations
- Cities: New York City, United States
- Venues: General Assembly Hall at the United Nations Headquarters
- Participants: United Nations Member States
- President: Miguel d'Escoto Brockmann
- Secretary-General: Ban Ki-moon
- Website: gadebate.un.org/en/sessions-archive/65

The general debate of the sixty-third session of the United Nations General Assembly was the first debate of the 63rd session of the United Nations General Assembly that ran from 23 – 29 September 2008. Leaders from a number of member states addressed the General Assembly.

== Organisation ==
The speaking order of the general debate is different from the speaking order of other General Assembly debates. For the general debate, the Secretary-General speaks first delivering their "Report of the Secretary-General on the work of the Organization, " they are then followed by: the President of the General Assembly who opens the general debate, the delegate from Brazil and the delegate from the United States of America. After this, the order is first given to Member States, then Observer States and supranational bodies. For all other Member States, speaking order is based on their level of representation at the general debate, order preference and other criteria such as geographic balance.

According to the rules in place for the general debate, statements should be made in one of the United Nations' official languages of Arabic, Chinese, English, French, Russian or Spanish, and are translated by United Nations translators. Additionally, speakers are usually limited to a 15-minute time limit in order to comply with the schedule set up by the General Committee. Member States are also advised to provide 350 paper copies of their statements in order for them to be distributed to other Member States, as well as to translation services.

The theme for the 64th Session was chosen by President Miguel d'Escoto Brockmann as: "The impact of the global food crisis on poverty and hunger in the world as well as the need to democratize the United Nations."

== Speaking schedule ==
=== 23 September 2008 ===
Morning Session

- United Nations – Secretary-General Ban Ki-moon (Report of the Secretary-General on the work of the Organization)
- United Nations – President of the 63rd Session of the General Assembly Miguel d'Escoto Brockmann (Opening)
- Brazil – President Luiz Inácio Lula da Silva
- United States of America – President George W. Bush
- France – President Nicolas Sarkozy
- Philippines – President Gloria Macapagal Arroyo
- Qatar – Amir Hamad bin Khalifa Al Thani
- Liberia – President Ellen Johnson-Sirleaf
- Turkey – President Abdullah Gül
- Argentina – President Cristina Fernández de Kirchner
- Madagascar – President Marc Ravalomanana
- Serbia – President Boris Tadić
- United Republic of Tanzania – President Jakaya Mrisho Kikwete (On behalf of the African Union)
- Gabon – Vice-President Didjob Divungi Di Ndinge

Afternoon Session

- Finland – President Tarja Halonen
- Bosnia and Herzegovina – Chairman of the Presidency Haris Silajdžić
- Rwanda – President Paul Kagame
- Lithuania – President Valdas Adamkus
- Iran (Islamic Republic of) – President Mahmoud Ahmadinejad
- Lebanon – President Michel Sleiman
- Kenya – President Mwai Kibaki
- Panama – President Martín Torrijos
- Uganda – President Yoweri Kaguta Museveni
- Guyana – President Bharrat Jagdeo
- Georgia – President Mikheil Saakashvili
- Bolivia – President Evo Morales
- Namibia – President Hifikepunye Pohamba
- Benin – President Thomas Boni Yayi

=== 24 September 2008 ===
Morning Session

- Sri Lanka – President Mahinda Rajapaksa
- Ukraine – President Victor Yushchenko
- Paraguay – President Fernando Lugo Méndez
- Portugal – President Aníbal Cavaco Silva
- Ghana – President John Agyekum Kufuor
- Chile – President Michelle Bachelet Jeria
- Slovenia – President Danilo Türk
- Dominican Republic – President Leonel Fernández Reyna
- Mexico – President Felipe Calderón Hinojosa
- Senegal – President Abdoulaye Wade
- Afghanistan – President Hamid Karzai
- Burkina Faso – President Blaise Compaoré
- Israel – President Shimon Peres
- China – Premier Wen Jiabao
- Cuba – Vice-President José Ramón Machado Ventura

Afternoon Session

- Honduras – President José Manuel Zelaya Rosales
- Mozambique – President Armando Emílio Guebuza
- Estonia – President Toomas Hendrik Ilves
- Malawi – President Bingu Wa Mutharika
- Cyprus – President Dimitris Christofias
- Colombia – President Álvaro Uribe Vélez
- Latvia – President Valdis Zatlers
- Nauru – President Marcus Stephen
- El Salvador – President Elías Antonio Saca González
- Suriname – President Ronald Venetiaan
- Guatemala – President Álvaro Colom Caballeros
- Poland – President Lech Kaczyński
- Central African Republic – President François Bozizé
- Cape Verde – President Pedro Verona Rodrigues Pires
- Albania – President Bamir Topi
- Costa Rica – President Óscar Arias Sánchez
- Mongolia – Prime Minister Sanjaa Bayar

=== 25 September 2008 ===
Morning Session

- Tajikistan – President Emomali Rahmon
- Macedonia – President Branko Crvenkovski
- Seychelles – President James Alix Michel
- Armenia – President Serzh Sargsyan
- Marshall Islands – President Litokwa Tomeing
- Comoros – President Ahmed Abdallah Sambi
- Equatorial Guinea – President Teodoro Obiang Nguema Mbasogo
- Kiribati – President Anote Tong
- Sao Tome and Principe – President Fradique Bandeira Melo de Menezes
- Sierra Leone – President Ernest Bai Koroma
- Iraq – President Jalal Talabani
- Palau – Vice-President Elias Camsek Chin
- Antigua and Barbuda – Prime Minister Winston Baldwin Spencer

Afternoon Session

- Micronesia (Federated States of) – President Emanuel Mori
- Guinea Bissau – President João Bernardo Vieira
- Swaziland – King Mswati III
- Timor-Leste – President José Ramos-Horta
- Zimbabwe – President Robert Mugabe
- Cameroon – President Paul Biya
- Pakistan – President Asif Ali Zardari
- Sudan – Vice-President Ali Osman Mohamed Taha
- Spain – President José Luis Rodríguez Zapatero
- Japan – Prime Minister Taro Aso
- Kuwait – Prime Minister Sheikh Nasser Al-Mohammad Al-Ahmad Al Jaber Al-Sabah
- Republic of Korea - Prime Minister Han Seung-soo
- Brunei Darussalam – Crown Prince Al-Muhtadee Billah
- Australia – Prime Minister Kevin Rudd
- Andorra – Chief of Government Albert Pintat
- San Marino – Head of Government Fiorenzo Stolfi
- Norway – Prime Minister Jens Stoltenberg
- Saint Kitts and Nevis – Prime Minister Denzil Douglas
- Netherlands – Prime Minister Jan Peter Balkenende

=== 26 September 2008 ===
Morning Session

- Montenegro – President Filip Vujanović
- Haiti – President René Garcia Préval
- Vanuatu – President Kalkot Mataskelekele
- Burundi – Vice-President Gabriel Ntisezerana
- Bangladesh – Chief Advisor of the Caretaker Government Fakhruddin Ahmed
- Nepal – Prime Minister Pushpa Kamal Dahal
- United Kingdom of Great Britain and Northern Ireland – Prime Minister Gordon Brown
- Jamaica – Prime Minister Bruce Golding
- Bhutan – Prime Minister Jigmi Yoezer Thinley
- Bulgaria – Prime Minister Sergei Stanishev
- Samoa – Prime Minister Tuilaepa Aiono Sailele Malielegaoi
- Bahamas – Prime Minister Hubert Alexander Ingraham
- Saint Vincent and the Grenadines – Prime Minister Ralph Gonsalves
- Palestine – President Mahmoud Abbas
- Austria – Minister for European and International Affairs Ursula Plassnik
- Nicaragua – Minister for Foreign Affairs Samuel Santos López

Afternoon Session

- Malta – Prime Minister Lawrence Gonzi
- Solomon Islands – Prime Minister Derek Sikua
- India – Prime Minister Manmohan Singh
- Croatia – Prime Minister Ivo Sanader
- Tuvalu – Prime Minister Apisai Ielemia
- Morocco – Prime Minister Abbas El Fassi
- Barbados – Prime Minister David Thompson
- Iceland – Prime Minister Geir H. Haarde
- Fiji – Prime Minister Josaia V. Bainimarama
- Dominica – Prime Minister Roosevelt Skerrit
- Tonga – Prime Minister Feleti Vakaʻuta Sevele
- Saint Lucia – Prime Minister Stephenson King
- Guinea – Prime Minister Ahmed Tidiane Souaré
- Luxembourg – Deputy Prime Minister Jean Asselborn
- Grenada – Prime Minister Tillman Thomas
- Germany – Minister for Foreign Affairs Frank-Walter Steinmeier
- Italy – Minister for Foreign Affairs Franco Frattini
- Slovakia – Minister for Foreign Affairs Ján Kubis
- Somalia – Minister for Foreign Affairs Ali Ahmed Jama Jengeli
- Angola – Minister of External Relations Joao Bernardo de Miranda

=== 27 September 2008 ===
Morning Session

- Viet Nam – Prime Minister Pham Gia Khiem
- Papua New Guinea – Deputy Prime Minister Puka Temu
- Peru – Minister for Foreign Affairs José Antonio García Belaúnde
- Egypt – Minister for Foreign Affairs Ahmed Aboul Gheit
- Mali – Minister for Foreign Affairs Moctar Ouane
- Azerbaijan – Minister for Foreign Affairs Elmar Mammadyarov
- Belgium – Minister for Foreign Affairs Karel De Gucht
- Syrian Arab Republic – Minister for Foreign Affairs Walid Al-Moualem
- Oman – Secretary-General of the Ministry of Foreign Affairs Badr bin Hamad Al Busaidi
- Kazakhstan – Minister for Foreign Affairs Marat Tazhin
- Algeria – Minister for Foreign Affairs Mourad Medelci
- Bahrain – Minister for Foreign Affairs Sheikh Khalid bin Ahmed Al Khalifa
- Gambia (Republic of The) – Minister for Foreign Affairs Omar Touray
- United Arab Emirates – Minister for Foreign Affairs Sheikh Abdullah Bin Zayed Al Nahyan
- Romania – Minister for Foreign Affairs Lazăr Comănescu
- Niger – Minister for Foreign Affairs Aïchatou Mindaoudou

Afternoon Session

- Russian Federation – Minister for Foreign Affairs Sergey Lavrov
- Tunisia – Minister for Foreign Affairs Abdelwahab Abdallah
- Hungary – Minister for Foreign Affairs Kinga Göncz
- Zambia – Minister for Foreign Affairs Kabinga Pande
- Lesotho – Minister for Foreign Affairs Mohlabi Tsekoa
- Indonesia – Minister for Foreign Affairs Hassan Wirajuda
- Monaco – Government Councilor for External Relations Franck Biancheri
- Uzbekistan – Minister for Foreign Affairs Vladimir Norov
- Greece – Minister for Foreign Affairs Dora Bakoyannis
- Togo – Minister for Foreign Affairs Kofi Esaw
- Trinidad and Tobago – Minister for Foreign Affairs Paula Gopee-Scoon
- Uruguay – Minister for Foreign Affairs Gonzalo Fernández
- Czech Republic – Minister for Foreign Affairs Karel Schwarzenberg
- Malaysia – Minister for Foreign Affairs Rais Yatim
- Democratic People’s Republic of Korea – Vice-Minister for Foreign Affairs Pak Kil-yon

==== Rights of Reply ====
Islamic Republic of Iran
The Islamic Republic of Iran used its Right of Reply to respond to statements made by the United Arab Emirates in their general debate speech before the Assembly. The United Arab Emirates, in its speech, stated that Iran's occupation of Abu Musa and the Greater and Lesser Tunbs was a central concern of the Emirates. It continued by stating that the Emirates consider all actions taken on the islands by Iran as null and void, while also calling for their full restoration to the Emirates, including their territorial waters, airspace, continental shelf and exclusive economic zones. Finally, the Emirates called on the international community to pressure Iran to respond to appeals by itself, the Gulf Cooperation Council and the League of Arab States to agree to solve the issue through serious negotiation, or by referral to the International Court of Justice.

Iran responded by rejecting the United Arab Emirate's claims as unacceptable, futile and unfounded. It continued by stating that the three islands were, and will always be, eternal parts of Iran, and consequently fell under Iranian sovereignty. It further stated that all actions on the islands had been taken in exercise of the sovereign rights of Iran, and were in accordance with arrangements emanating from the Memorandum of Understanding agreed to in 1971 between the Emirate of Sharjah and Iran.

Japan
Japan used its Right of Reply to respond to statements made by the Democratic People's Republic of Korea (DPRK) in their general debate speech before the Assembly. The DPRK, in its speech, brought up its relationship with Japan and stated that one of the reasons that these relations were unresolved lie in Japan's failure to acknowledge its past, which is stained, according to the DPRK, with large-scale crimes. It continued by claiming that Japan was whitewashing its history of aggression and massacre of millions of Koreans, while also attempting to steal the Tok Islet from its rightful owner. It finished by stating that Japan should never be allowed to become a permanent member of the Security Council.

Japan responded to these allegations by claiming that it had been attempting to face up to its past sincerely, while officially expressing remorse and apologizing for its actions in the Second World War. It continued by stating that since the end of the War, Japan had consistently dedicated itself to promoting international peace and respect for democracy and human rights. In regards to the Security Council, it stated that Japan had already served as a non-permanent member nine times and had made positive contributions to international stability by discharging their role as a member of the council. Finally, in regards to normalizing relations, it stated that under the Pyongyang Declaration, Japan would work to normalize its relations with the DPRK through settlement of its past, as well as by comprehensive resolution of outstanding conflicts.

United Arab Emirates
The United Arab Emirates used its Right of Reply to respond to the Right of Reply of the Islamic Republic of Iran. Specifically, it claimed that Iran's sovereignty over Abu Musa and the greater and lesser Tunbs is unjust and illegal. Furthermore, it stated that the Emirates would never, and will never, relinquish its legal, historical and political rights to the islands, which it claims as an integral part of its sovereign territory and exclusive economic zone. Finally, it appealed to the international community to urge Iran to agree to enter into unconditional bilateral negotiations, or to take the matter to the International Court of Justice.

Democratic People's Republic of Korea
The Democratic People's Republic of Korea used its Right of Reply to respond to the Right of Reply of Japan. It claimed that Japan's remarks were divorced from reality, and that Japan was not doing enough to redress its past crimes. In regards to the Pyongyang Declaration, the DPRK claimed that it had lived up to its obligations sincerely by opening investigations into the issue of 13 missing Japanese nationals, and by returning five of these surviving nationals, and all their children, to Japan.

The DPRK then claimed that Japan had not shown any tangible evidence that it intended to comply with the Declaration or properly redress its past crimes. It claimed that Japan had refused to admit to its crimes against humanity committed during the illegal military occupation of Korea, such as the massacre of 1 million Korean people, the forced labour of 8.4 million Koreans and the sexual slavery of 200,000 Korean women. Finally, it stated that if Japan were to settle its criminal past, it would be to win the trust of the international community.

Japan
Japan used its Right of Reply to respond to the Right of Reply of the Democratic People's Republic of Korea. It responded by reminding the DPRK of working level consultations held in June and August 2008 in which both sides agreed to the approach that a comprehensive investigation into the issue of the missing Japanese nationals by the DPRK nationals would follow. Japan then claimed that the DPRK later rescinded its responsibilities under the consultations due to a government change in Japan.

Regarding comments made about the topic of Japan's past, it restated that it had been facing up to its past with sincerity and consistency, but that the numbers the DPRK cited were totally groundless. Finally, in regards to comfort women, the delegation stated that the Government of Japan continued to adhere to the position expressed by Chief Cabinet Secretary Yohei Kono in his 4 August 1993 statement, in which the Government of Japan extended its "Sincere apologies and remorse."

Democratic People's Republic of Korea
The Democratic People's Republic of Korea used its Right of Reply to respond to the Right of Reply of Japan. It stated that, as Japan had refused to reveal the figures it held in its archives, the numbers it mentioned in its Right of Reply were what the DPRK had received at that point. These numbers were: 7,784,839 Koreans that were drafted for forced labor and 200,000 Korean teenagers, girls and women that were forced to serve the Japanese as comfort women. Finally, the DPRK claimed that as it took half a century for Japan to even admit its crimes in Korea, it did not know how long it would take for it to liquidate these crimes.

=== 29 September 2008 ===
Morning Session

- Lao People’s Democratic Republic – Deputy Prime Minister Thongloun Sisoulith
- Turkmenistan – Deputy Prime Minister Rashid Meredov
- Republic of Moldova – Deputy Prime Minister Andrei Stratan
- Liechtenstein – Minister for Foreign Affairs Rita Kieber-Beck
- Singapore – Minister for Foreign Affairs George Yeo
- Yemen – Minister for Foreign Affairs Abu Bakr al-Qirbi
- Jordan – Minister for Foreign Affairs Salah Bashir
- Myanmar – Minister for Foreign Affairs Nyan Win
- Botswana – Minister for Foreign Affairs Phandu Phandu Skelemani
- Chad – Minister for Foreign Affairs Moussa Faki
- Congo – Minister for Foreign Affairs Basile Ikouebe
- Côte d'Ivoire – Minister for Foreign Affairs Youssouf Bakayoko
- Kyrgyzstan – State Secretary Nur Uulu Dosbol
- Libyan Arab Jamahiriya – Chairperson of the Delegation Giadalla Ettalhi
- Ecuador – Chairperson of the Delegation María Fernanda Espinosa
- Denmark – Chairperson of the Delegation Carsten Staur

Afternoon Session

- Ireland – Minister for Foreign Affairs Micheál Martin
- Ethiopia – Minister for Foreign Affairs Seyoum Mesfin
- Belize – Minister for Foreign Affairs Wilfred Elrington
- Nigeria – Minister for Foreign Affairs Ojo Maduekwe
- South Africa – Minister for Foreign Affairs Nkosazana Dlamini-Zuma
- Eritrea – Minister for Foreign Affairs Osman Saleh Mohammed
- Canada – Deputy Foreign Minister Leonard Edwards
- Cambodia – Secretary of State Ouch Borith
- Venezuela (Bolivarian Republic of) – Chairperson of the Delegation Roy Chaderton Matos
- New Zealand – Chairperson of the Delegation Rosemary Banks
- Thailand – Chairperson of the Delegation Don Pramudwinai
- Belarus – Chairperson of the Delegation Andrei Dapkiunas
- Switzerland – Chairperson of the Delegation Peter Maurer
- Mauritius – Chairperson of the Delegation Somduth Soborun
- Maldives – Chairperson of the Delegation Ahmed Khaleel
- Mauritania – Chairperson of the Delegation Abderrahim Ould Hadrami
- Democratic Republic of the Congo – Chairperson of the Delegation Christian Atoki Ileka
- Sweden – Chairperson of the Delegation Anders Lidén
- Holy See – Chairperson of the Delegation Archbishop Celestino Migliore
- United Nations – President of the 63rd Session of the General Assembly Miguel d'Escoto Brockmann (Closing)

==== Rights of Reply ====
Ethiopia
Ethiopia used its Right of Reply to respond to statements made by Eritrea in their general debate speech before the Assembly. Eritrea, in its speech, mentioned that, in regards to the Eritrean–Ethiopian border conflict, both parties had agreed to resolve the dispute through binding arbitration according to the principles of international law as enshrined in the United Nations Charter, the Constitutive Act of the African Union and the Algiers Peace Agreement. It further mentioned that the Eritrea-Ethiopia Boundary Commission, as set up by the Algiers Agreement, had announced its unanimous final decision on 13 April 2002. However, it claimed that, since November 2007 Ethiopia was in violation of this decision by continuing its military presence in sovereign Eritrean territories.

Eritrea also raised the topic of Ethiopia's involvement in the Somali Civil War. It claimed that Ethiopia, with aid from the United States of America, had destabilized Somalia with its aggression, ultimately leading to the deaths of thousands of Somalis, as well as the displacement of close to half a million. Finally, Eritrea claimed that the Somalis could have been given the chance to sort out their internal problems through the reconciliation processes that they had already begun, but were stopped through a pre-emptive invasion by Ethiopia, which created the largest humanitarian crisis that Africa had ever seen.

Ethiopia responded by completely rejecting Eritrea's claim that it was occupying Eritrean sovereign territory, calling Eritrea a country ruled by an absolute dictatorship, devoid of any semblance of political institutions. It continued by stating that it was Eritrea, and not Ethiopia, that was guilty of aggression against Yemen, Sudan and Djibouti. In regards to Somalia, Ethiopia stated that it was not an invading force, but was involved at the invitation of the Transitional Federal Government.

It further claimed that Eritrea was hosting regional and international terrorists and was directly supporting and collaborating with terrorists in Somalia. Finally, it claimed that Eritrea's troubles with its neighbors lay not in any legitimate disagreement over boundary, but rather from the troublesome character of its own Government. It finished by urging the international community to note that the conduct of the regime in Eritrea was unacceptable to the civilized world.

Eritrea
Eritrea used its Right of Reply to respond the Right of Reply of Ethiopia. Eritrea accused Ethiopia of making false and unsubstantiated allegations against it, as well as attempting to escape its obligations under the Algiers Agreement. It also stated that had Ethiopia not reneged on its acceptance of the Eritrea-Ethiopia Boundary Commission's award when it was announced in 2002, and had it cooperated fully with the Commission in its implementation, the issues between Eritrea and Ethiopia could have already been resolved. Finally, Eritrea accused Ethiopia and its allies of attempting to frustrate and undermine the authority and the decisions of the Eritrea-Ethiopia Boundary Commission.

In regards to Somalia, Eritrea accused Ethiopia of invading Somalia in contravention of various Security Council resolutions. Further stating that any attempts to portray as legitimate the illegal occupation of Somalia by Ethiopia, as well as the interferences in its affairs, was a mockery to international law. Finally, Eritrea asserted that, if left to their own devices, the Somali people and government would have a solution to the problems they were facing.

== See also ==
- List of UN General Assembly sessions
- List of General debates of the United Nations General Assembly
