= List of international prime ministerial trips made by Yukio Hatoyama =

The following is a list of international prime ministerial trips made by Yukio Hatoyama during his tenure as the Prime Minister of Japan from September 2009 to June 2010.

== Summary ==
The number of visits per country where he has travelled are:

- One visit to: China, Denmark, India, Indonesia, Singapore, Thailand
- Two visits to: South Korea, the United States

== 2009 ==
No.	Country	Locations	Dates	Details
1	United States	Washington, D.C., New York City, Pittsburgh	21–26 September	Hatoyama visited the United States to attend the 64th session of the United Nations General Assembly in New York City and the 2009 G20 Pittsburgh summit. During his visit, he delivered an address at the United Nations General Assembly, held bilateral meetings with foreign leaders, and participated in the G20 summit in Pittsburgh. He also attended a baseball-related event at PNC Park.
2	South Korea	Seoul	9 October	Hatoyama made his first official bilateral visit to South Korea as Prime Minister. He visited the Seoul National Cemetery, where he offered a wreath, and held a summit meeting with President Lee Myung-bak at Cheong Wa Dae. The two leaders discussed bilateral economic cooperation, cultural exchanges, and the North Korean nuclear and missile issues.
3	China	Beijing	10 October	Hatoyama attended the second China–Japan–South Korea trilateral meeting in Beijing alongside Chinese Premier Wen Jiabao and South Korean President Lee Myung-bak. The three leaders discussed regional cooperation, economic relations, and issues concerning East Asian security. Hatoyama also held discussions with the Chinese and South Korean leaders on strengthening trilateral cooperation.
4	Thailand	Hua Hin, Cha-am	24–25 October	Hatoyama visited Thailand to participate in the Fourth East Asia Summit and related ASEAN meetings. He attended the Japan-ASEAN Summit Meeting, the ASEAN Plus Three Summit, and the East Asia Summit. He also held a bilateral meeting with Indonesian President Susilo Bambang Yudhoyono, during which he discussed Japanese development assistance and cooperation on climate change.
5	Singapore	Singapore	14–15 November	Hatoyama attended the Asia-Pacific Economic Cooperation (APEC) Economic Leaders' Meeting. He participated in discussions on regional economic integration, international trade, and climate change. He also held a bilateral summit meeting with Russian President Dmitry Medvedev and delivered an address outlining Japan's policy toward Asia.
6	Indonesia	Bali	10 December	Hatoyama attended the Bali Democracy Forum II, where he served as co-chair alongside Indonesian President Susilo Bambang Yudhoyono. He delivered an address at the opening ceremony, emphasizing democracy, human rights, and regional cooperation. He also held a Japan-Indonesia summit meeting and discussed bilateral relations and climate change cooperation.
7	Denmark	Copenhagen	17–18 December	Hatoyama visited Denmark to attend an informal high-level event at the 15th Conference of the Parties (COP15). He held a bilateral summit meeting with Danish Prime Minister Lars Løkke Rasmussen and a separate meeting with Chinese Premier Wen Jiabao. Discussions focused on climate change, international cooperation, and Japan's relations with Denmark and China.
8	India	Mumbai, New Delhi	27–29 December	Hatoyama visited India at the invitation of Prime Minister Manmohan Singh. In Mumbai, he met with prominent Indian business leaders, including Mukesh Ambani and Ratan Tata. He subsequently travelled to New Delhi, where he met with Sonia Gandhi and held the annual Japan-India summit meeting with Prime Minister Singh on 29 December. The two leaders discussed bilateral relations, economic cooperation, regional security, and the development of their Strategic and Global Partnership.

== 2010 ==
No.	Country	Locations	Dates	Details
1	United States	Washington, D.C.	12–14 April	Hatoyama visited Washington, D.C., to attend the 2010 Nuclear Security Summit. He participated in discussions concerning international nuclear security and efforts to prevent nuclear terrorism. During the summit, he held separate bilateral meetings with Russian President Dmitry Medvedev and French President Nicolas Sarkozy.
2	South Korea	Daejeon, Jeju Island	29–30 May	Hatoyama visited South Korea to attend the third China–Japan–South Korea trilateral summit. On the first day, he visited the Daejeon National Cemetery and paid his respects to the victims of the sinking of the South Korean naval vessel ROKS Cheonan. He also held a bilateral summit meeting with President Lee Myung-bak before attending the trilateral summit with Chinese Premier Wen Jiabao. On the second day, the three leaders discussed regional cooperation and signed a memorandum establishing the Trilateral Cooperation Secretariat. Hatoyama also participated in a joint press conference and related ceremonies.

== Multilateral meetings ==
Prime Minister Hatoyama attended the following international summits and multilateral meetings during his prime ministership (2009–2010):

Group	Year	
Group	2009	2010
UNGA	21–25 September, (United States) New York City	
EAS	25 October, (Thailand) Hua Hin	
ASEAN Plus Three	24 October, (Thailand) Hua Hin	
ASEAN–Japan Summit	24 October, (Thailand) Hua Hin	
APEC	14–15 November, Singapore	
G8		
G20	24–25 September, (United States) Pittsburgh	
NSS		12–13 April, (United States) Washington, D.C.
COP15	17–18 December, (Denmark) Copenhagen	
Japan-China-ROK Trilateral Summit	10 October, (China) Beijing	29–30 May, (South Korea) Jeju Island
