= Asia–Europe Meeting =

Asian–European political dialogue forum

Asia–Europe Meeting (ASEM)
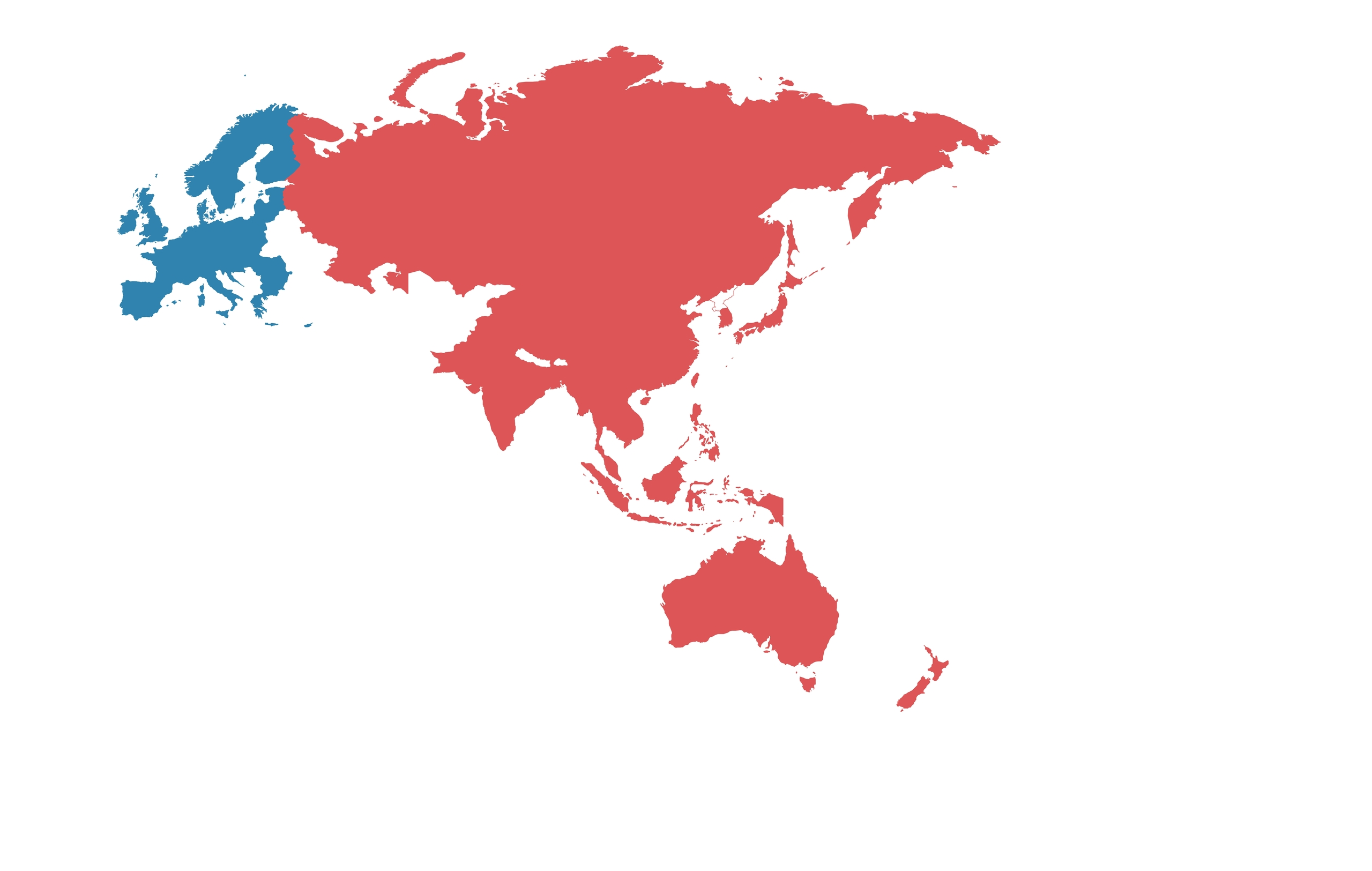
- Type: Political Dialogue Forum
- Partnership: 53 ASEM Partners 51 countries: Australia; Austria; Bangladesh; Belgium; Brunei Darussalam; Bulgaria; Cambodia; China; Croatia; Cyprus; Czech Republic; Denmark; Estonia; Finland; France; Germany; Greece; Hungary; India; Indonesia; Ireland; Italy; Japan; Kazakhstan; Laos; Latvia; Lithuania; Luxembourg; Malaysia; Malta; Mongolia; Myanmar; Netherlands; New Zealand; Norway; Pakistan; Philippines; Poland; Portugal; Romania; Russia; Singapore; Slovakia; Slovenia; South Korea; Spain; Sweden; Switzerland; Thailand; United Kingdom; Vietnam; 2 organizations: Association of Southeast Asian Nations; European Union
- Establishment: 1996
- Website www.ASEMInfoBoard.org

The Asia–Europe Meeting (ASEM) is an Asian–European political dialogue forum to enhance relations and various forms of cooperation between its partners. It was officially established on 1 March 1996 at the 1st ASEM Summit (ASEM1) in Bangkok, Thailand, by the then 15 Member States of the European Union (EU) and the European Commission, the then 7 Member States of the Association of Southeast Asian Nations (ASEAN), and the individual countries of China, Japan, and South Korea. A series of enlargements saw additional EU Member States join as well as India, Mongolia, Pakistan and the ASEAN Secretariat in 2008, Australia, New Zealand and Russia in 2010, Bangladesh, Norway, and Switzerland in 2012, as well as Croatia, and Kazakhstan in 2014.

The main components of the ASEM Process rest on the following 3 pillars:

- Political Pillar
- Economic & Financial Pillar
- Social, Cultural & Educational Pillar

In general, the ASEM Process is considered by the Partners involved to be a way of deepening the relations between Asia and Europe at all levels, which is deemed necessary to achieve a more balanced political and economic world order. The process is enhanced by the biennial meetings of Heads of State and Government, alternately in Asia and Europe, and biennial meetings of Foreign Ministers as well as other Ministerial Meetings, and other political, economic, and socio-cultural events at various levels.

== Partners ==
The ASEM Partnership currently has 53 Partners: 51 countries and 2 regional organisations. The countries are Australia, Austria, Bangladesh, Belgium, Brunei, Bulgaria, Cambodia, China, Croatia, Cyprus, the Czech Republic, Denmark, Estonia, Finland, France, Germany, Greece, Hungary, India, Indonesia, Ireland, Italy, Japan, Kazakhstan, Laos, Latvia, Lithuania, Luxembourg, Malaysia, Malta, Mongolia, Myanmar, the Netherlands, New Zealand, Norway, Pakistan, the Philippines, Poland, Portugal, Romania, Russia, Singapore, Slovakia, Slovenia, South Korea, Spain, Sweden, Switzerland, Thailand, the United Kingdom and Vietnam while the European Union and the ASEAN Secretariat are the regional organisations involved.

== Meetings ==
=== ASEM Summits ===
Biennial Summits are held alternating between Asia and Europe, attended by the Heads of State and Government of the respective partner countries and organisations:

- ASEM13: 25–26 November 2021, Phnom Penh, Cambodia
- ASEM12: 18–19 October 2018, Brussels, Belgium
- ASEM11: 15–16 July 2016, Ulaanbaatar, Mongolia
- ASEM10: 16–17 October 2014, Milan, Italy
- ASEM9: 05–6 November 2012, Vientiane, Laos
- ASEM8: 04–5 October 2010, Brussels, Belgium
- ASEM7: 24–25 October 2008, Beijing, China
- ASEM6: 10–11 September 2006, Helsinki, Finland
- ASEM5: 08–9 October 2004, Hanoi, Vietnam
- ASEM4 : 22–24 September 2002, Copenhagen, Denmark
- ASEM3: 20–21 October 2000, Seoul, South Korea
- ASEM2: 03–4 April 1998, London, United Kingdom
- ASEM1: 1–2 March 1996, Bangkok, Thailand

=== ASEM Ministerial Meetings ===
Aside from Summits, regular Ministerial Meetings are held on foreign affairs, financial, cultural, economic, educational, labour and employment, transport, or environmental issues, attended by the relevant ministers:

==== ASEM Foreign Ministers' Meetings (ASEMFMM) ====
- ASEMFMM14 : 15–16 December 2019, Madrid, Spain
- ASEMFMM13: 20–21 November 2017, Naypyidaw, Myanmar
- ASEMFMM12: 05–6 November 2015, Luxembourg, Luxembourg
- ASEMFMM11 : 11–12 November 2013, New Delhi, India
- ASEMFMM10 : 06–7 June 2011, Gödöllő, Hungary
- ASEMFMM9 : 25–26 May 2009, Hanoi, Vietnam
- ASEMFMM8 : 28–29 May 2007, Hamburg, Germany
- ASEMFMM7 : 06–7 May 2005, Kyoto, Japan
- ASEMFMM6 : 17–18 April 2004, Kildare, Ireland
- ASEMFMM5 : 23–24 July 2003, Bali, Indonesia
- ASEMFMM4 : 06–7 June 2002, Madrid, Spain
- ASEMFMM3 : 24–25 May 2001, Beijing, China
- ASEMFMM2 : 29 March 1999, Berlin, Germany
- ASEMFMM1 : 15 February 1997, Singapore

==== ASEM Finance Ministers' Meetings (ASEMFinMM) ====
- ASEMFinMM14: 2020, Dhaka, Bangladesh
- ASEMFinMM13 : 26 April 2018, Sofia, Bulgaria
- ASEMFinMM12 : 09–10 June 2016, Ulaanbaatar, Mongolia
- ASEMFinMM11 : 11–12 September 2014, Milan, Italy
- ASEMFinMM10 : 15 October 2012, Bangkok, Thailand
- ASEMFinMM9 : 17–18 April 2010, Madrid, Spain
- ASEMFinMM8 : 16 June 2008, Jeju, South Korea
- ASEMFinMM7 : 08–9 April 2006, Vienna, Austria
- ASEMFinMM6 : 25–26 June 2005, Tianjin, China
- ASEMFinMM5 : 05–6 July 2003, Bali, Indonesia
- ASEMFinMM4 : 05–6 July 2002, Copenhagen, Denmark
- ASEMFinMM3 : 13–14 January 2001, Kobe, Japan
- ASEMFinMM2 : 15–16 September 1999, Frankfurt, Germany
- ASEMFinMM1 : 19 September 1997, Bangkok, Thailand

==== ASEM Culture Ministers' Meetings (ASEMCMM) ====
- ASEMCMM9: 2020, Asia
- ASEMCMM8: 01-2 March 2018, Sofia, Bulgaria
- ASEMCMM7 : 22–24 June 2016, Gwangju, South Korea
- ASEMCMM6 : 20–21 October 2014, Rotterdam, Netherlands
- ASEMCMM5: 18–19 September 2012, Yogyakarta, Indonesia
- ASEMCMM4: 08–10 September 2010, Poznań, Poland
- ASEMCMM3: 21–24 April 2008, Kuala Lumpur, Malaysia
- ASEMCMM2: 06–7 June 2005, Paris, France
- ASEMCMM1: 3 December 2003, Beijing, China

==== ASEM Economic Ministers' Meetings (ASEMEMM) ====
- ASEMEMM7: 21–22 September 2017, Seoul, South Korea
- High-level Meeting: 16–17 September 2005, Rotterdam, Netherlands
- ASEMEMM5: 23–24 July 2003, Dalian, China
- ASEMEMM4: 18–19 September 2002, Copenhagen, Denmark
- ASEMEMM3: 10–11 September 2001, Hanoi, Vietnam
- ASEMEMM2: 09–10 October 1999, Berlin, Germany
- ASEMEMM1: 27–28 September 1997, Makuhari, Japan

==== ASEM Education Ministers' Meetings (ASEMME) ====
- ASEMME9: 25–26 January 2024, Valletta, Malta
- ASEMME8: 15 December 2021, Bangkok (online), Thailand
- ASEMME7 : 15–16 May 2019, Bucharest, Romania
- ASEMME6: 21–22 November 2017, Seoul, South Korea
- ASEMME5: 27–28 April 2015, Riga, Latvia
- ASEMME4: 12–14 May 2013, Kuala Lumpur, Malaysia
- ASEMME3: 09–10 May 2011, Copenhagen, Denmark
- ASEMME2: 14–15 May 2009, Hanoi, Vietnam
- ASEMME1: 05–6 May 2008, Berlin, Germany

==== ASEM Labour and Employment Ministers' Conferences (ASEMLEMC) ====
- ASEMLEMC5 : 03–4 December 2015, Sofia, Bulgaria
- ASEMLEMC4: 24–26 October 2012, Hanoi, Vietnam
- ASEMLEMC3: 12–14 December 2010, Leiden, Netherlands
- ASEMLEMC2: 13–15 October 2008, Bali, Indonesia
- ASEMLEMC1: 3 September 2006, Potsdam, Germany

==== ASEM Transport Ministers' Meetings (ASEMTMM) ====
- ASEMTMM5 : 11–12 December 2019, Budapest, Hungary
- ASEMTMM4 : 26–28 September 2017, Bali, Indonesia
- ASEMTMM3 : 29–30 April 2015, Riga, Latvia
- ASEMTMM2: 24–25 October 2011, Chengdu, China
- ASEMTMM1 : 19–20 October 2009, Vilnius, Lithuania

==== ASEM Environment Ministers' Meetings (ASEMEnvMM) ====
- ASEMEnvMM4 : 22–23 May 2012, Ulaanbaatar, Mongolia
- ASEMEnvMM3 : 23–26 April 2007, Copenhagen, Denmark
- ASEMEnvMM2 : 12–13 October 2003, Lecce, Italy
- ASEMEnvMM1 : 17 January 2002, Beijing, China

==== ASEM Ministerial Conference on Energy Security (ASEMESMC) ====
- ASEMESMC1: 17–18 June 2009, Brussels, Belgium

== See also ==
- ASEM Education Process
- Asia-Europe Foundation (ASEF), the only permanently established institution under the ASEM framework
- European Union, Latin America and the Caribbean Summit
