= List of United States presidential visits to Southeast Asia =

Mainland and Maritime Southeast Asia (both highlighted dark green)

There have been twenty-five United States presidential visits to Southeast Asia by ten U.S. presidents. Dwight D. Eisenhower became the first incumbent president to visit a Southeast Asian country when he visited the Philippines in 1960. Since then, every president, except John F. Kennedy and Jimmy Carter, has travelled to the region. The Philippines, a former U.S. colony (1902–1946) and a close U.S. ally, is the most visited Southeast Asian country with eleven visits, followed by Indonesia with nine, and Vietnam with eight. Of the eleven sovereign states in the region, all but Timor-Leste have been visited by a sitting American president.

== Table of visits ==
President	Dates	Countries	Locations	Key details
Dwight D. Eisenhower	June 14–16, 1960	Philippines	Manila	State visit. Met with President Carlos P. Garcia.
Lyndon B. Johnson	October 24–26, 1966	Philippines	Manila, Los Baños, Corregidor	Attended the Manila Summit Conference on the Vietnam War.
Lyndon B. Johnson	October 26, 1966	South Vietnam	Cam Ranh Bay	Visited U.S. military personnel.
Lyndon B. Johnson	October 27–30, 1966	Thailand	Bangkok	State visit. Met with King Bhumibol Adulyadej.
Lyndon B. Johnson	October 30–31, 1966	Malaysia	Kuala Lumpur	State visit. Met with Prime Minister Tunku Abdul Rahman.
Lyndon B. Johnson	December 23, 1967	Thailand	Khorat	Visited US. military personnel.
Lyndon B. Johnson	December 23, 1967	South Vietnam	Cam Ranh Bay	Visited U.S. military personnel.
Richard Nixon	July 26–27, 1969	Philippines	Manila	State visit. Met with President Ferdinand Marcos.
Richard Nixon	July 27–28, 1969	Indonesia	Jakarta	State visit. Met with President Suharto.
Richard Nixon	July 28–30, 1969	Thailand	Bangkok	State visit. Met with King Bhumibol Adulyadej.
Richard Nixon	July 30, 1969	South Vietnam	Saigon, Dĩ An	Met with President Nguyễn Văn Thiệu. Visited U.S. military personnel.
Gerald Ford	December 4–5, 1975	Indonesia	Jakarta	Official visit. Met with President Suharto.
Gerald Ford	December 6–7, 1975	Philippines	Manila	Official visit. Met with President Ferdinand Marcos.
Ronald Reagan	April 29 – May 2, 1986	Indonesia	Bali	Attended the ASEAN Ministerial Meeting. Met with President Suharto and Philippine Vice President Salvador Laurel.
George H. W. Bush	January 3–5, 1992	Singapore	Singapore	Met with President Wee Kim Wee and Prime Minister Goh Chok Tong. Attended an ASEAN Business Council meeting.
Bill Clinton	November 12–13, 1994	Philippines	Manila, Corregidor	State visit. Met with President Fidel V. Ramos. Visited Corregidor Island.
Bill Clinton	November 13–16, 1994	Indonesia	Jakarta, Bogor	State visit. Attended the APEC Economic Leaders' Meeting in Bogor.
Bill Clinton	November 24–25, 1996	Philippines	Manila, Subic Bay	Attended the APEC Economic Leaders' Meeting. Met with Chinese President & CCP General Secretary Jiang Zemin, Japanese Prime Minister Ryutaro Hashimoto, and South Korean President Kim Young-sam.
Bill Clinton	November 25–26, 1996	Thailand	Bangkok	State visit. Met with Prime Minister Banharn Silpa-archa. Received an honorary degree and delivered a speech at Chulalongkorn University.
Bill Clinton	November 14–16, 2000	Brunei	Bandar Seri Begawan	Attended the APEC Economic Leaders' Meeting.
Bill Clinton	November 16–19, 2000	Vietnam	Hanoi, Tien Chau, Ho Chi Minh City	Met with Communist Party General Secretary Lê Khả Phiêu, President Trần Đức Lương and Prime Minister Phan Văn Khải. Visited the Temple of Literature and the Tien Chau village in Hanoi. Viewed a cultural performance at the Hanoi Opera House. Delivered speeches at the Vietnam National University and Saigon Port.
George W. Bush	October 18–19, 2003	Philippines	Manila	State visit. Addressed a joint session of the Congress of the Philippines. Met with President Gloria Macapagal Arroyo.
George W. Bush	October 19–21, 2003	Thailand	Bangkok	Attended the APEC Economic Leaders' Meeting.
George W. Bush	October 21–22, 2003	Singapore	Singapore	Official visit. Met with President S. R. Nathan and Prime Minister Goh Chok Tong.
George W. Bush	October 22, 2003	Indonesia	Bali	Met with President Megawati Sukarnoputri and Islamic religious leaders. Paid respects to the victims of the 2002 Bali bombings and the 2003 Marriott Hotel bombing.
George W. Bush	November 16–17, 2006	Singapore	Singapore	Official visit. Met with Acting President J. Y. Pillay and Prime Minister Lee Hsien Loong. Delivered a speech at the National University of Singapore.
George W. Bush	November 17–20, 2006	Vietnam	Hanoi, Ho Chi Minh City	Official visit. Met with Communist Party General Secretary Nông Đức Mạnh, President Nguyễn Minh Triết and Prime Minister Nguyễn Tấn Dũng. Attended the APEC Economic Leaders' Meeting. Visited the Cửa Bắc Church, the Museum of Vietnamese History, Institut Pasteur, and the Ho Chi Minh City Stock Exchange.
George W. Bush	November 20, 2006	Indonesia	Jakarta, Bogor	Met with President Susilo Bambang Yudhoyono at the Bogor Palace.
George W. Bush	August 6–7, 2008	Thailand	Bangkok	Met with Prime Minister Samak Sundaravej and King Bhumibol Adulyadej. Dined with Burmese activists involved in the 8888 Uprising.
Barack Obama	November 14–15, 2009	Singapore	Singapore	Attended the APEC Economic Leaders' Meeting. Met with Prime Minister Lee Hsien Loong, Russian President Vladimir Putin, and Indonesian President Susilo Bambang Yudhoyono.
Barack Obama	November 9–10, 2010	Indonesia	Jakarta	Met with President Susilo Bambang Yudhoyono. Delivered a speech at the University of Indonesia. Visited the Istiqlal Mosque.
Barack Obama	November 17–20, 2011	Indonesia	Bali	Attended the Sixth East Asia Summit. Met with Indian Prime Minister Manmohan Singh, Philippine President Benigno Aquino III, and Malaysian Prime Minister Najib Razak.
Barack Obama	November 18–19, 2012	Thailand	Bangkok	Met with King Bhumibol Adulyadej at Siriraj Hospital and Prime Minister Yingluck Shinawatra at the Government House of Thailand. Toured Wat Pho.
Barack Obama	November 19, 2012	Myanmar (Burma)	Yangon	Met with President Thein Sein, National League for Democracy leader Aung San Suu Kyi, and members of Burmese civil society organizations. Delivered a speech at the University of Yangon.
Barack Obama	November 19–20, 2012	Cambodia	Phnom Penh	Met with Prime Minister Hun Sen. Attended the Seventh East Asia Summit, a U.S.-ASEAN Leaders' meeting, and a meeting with Trans-Pacific Partnership leaders.
Barack Obama	April 26–28, 2014	Malaysia	Kuala Lumpur	Met with the Yang di-Pertuan Agong, Sultan Abdul Halim, and Prime Minister Najib Razak. Participated in a town hall meeting with young Southeast Asian leaders at the University of Malaya.
Barack Obama	April 28–29, 2014	Philippines	Manila, Taguig	State visit. Met with President Benigno Aquino III. Conferred the Order of Sikatuna. Met with U.S. and Philippine troops and delivered remarks at Fort Bonifacio. Laid a wreath and toured the Manila American Cemetery and Memorial.
Barack Obama	November 12–14, 2014	Myanmar (Burma)	Naypyidaw, Yangon	Attended the Ninth East Asia Summit and the U.S.-ASEAN summit meeting in Naypyidaw. Met with President Thein Sein, National League for Democracy leader Aung San Suu Kyi, members of the Assembly of the Union, House of Representatives Speaker Shwe Mann, House of Nationalities Speaker Khin Aung Myint, and Vietnamese Prime Minister Nguyễn Tấn Dũng. Participated in a town hall meeting with young Southeast Asian leaders at the University of Yangon. Toured the Ministers' Building. Also participated in a round table discussion with Burmese civil society organizations.
Barack Obama	November 17–20, 2015	Philippines	Manila	Attended the APEC Economic Leaders' Meeting. Met with President Benigno Aquino III, Australian Prime Minister Malcolm Turnbull, Canadian Prime Minister Justin Trudeau, and Japanese Prime Minister Shinzō Abe. Also met with Trans-Pacific Partnership and Pacific Alliance leaders. Toured the BRP Gregorio del Pilar (PF-15) and announced the U.S. government's donation of the research vessel RV Melville and the USCGC Boutwell (WHEC-719) to the Philippine Navy. Participated in the APEC 2015 CEO Summit with Alibaba founder Jack Ma and SALt lamp inventor Aisa Mijeno.
Barack Obama	November 20–22, 2015	Malaysia	Kuala Lumpur	Attended the Tenth East Asia Summit and the U.S.-ASEAN summit meeting. Visited refugees (mostly Rohingya refugees) at the Dignity for Children Foundation refugee center. Participated in a town hall meeting with young Southeast Asian leaders at Taylor's University. Also participated in a round table meeting with Malaysian civil society groups at the Ritz-Carlton Kuala Lumpur. Met with Lao Prime Minister Thongsing Thammavong and Singaporean Prime Minister Lee Hsien Loong.
Barack Obama	May 22–25, 2016	Vietnam	Hanoi, Ho Chi Minh City	Met with Communist Party General Secretary Nguyễn Phú Trọng, President Trần Đại Quang and Prime Minister Nguyễn Xuân Phúc. Visited the Jade Emperor Pagoda.
Barack Obama	September 6–8, 2016	Laos	Vientiane	Met with General Secretary and President Bounnhang Vorachith. Attended the Eleventh East Asia Summit and the U.S.–ASEAN summit meeting.
Donald Trump	November 10–12, 2017	Vietnam	Da Nang, Hanoi	State visit. Attended the APEC Vietnam 2017 in Da Nang. Met with Communist Party General Secretary Nguyễn Phú Trọng, President Trần Đại Quang and Prime Minister Nguyễn Xuân Phúc.
Donald Trump	November 12–14, 2017	Philippines	Manila, Pasay	Attended the 31st ASEAN Summit. Met with President Rodrigo Duterte.
Donald Trump	June 10–12, 2018	Singapore	Central Area, Sentosa Island	Attended the first North Korea–United States summit with North Korean chairman Kim Jong-un. Also met with Prime Minister Lee Hsien Loong.
Donald Trump	February 26–28, 2019	Vietnam	Hanoi	Attended the second North Korea–United States summit with North Korean supreme leader Kim Jong Un. Also met with General Secretary & President Nguyễn Phú Trọng and Prime Minister Nguyễn Xuân Phúc.
Joe Biden	November 12–13, 2022	Cambodia	Phnom Penh	Attended the U.S.–ASEAN Summit and the Seventeenth East Asia Summit at Sokha Hotel. Met with Prime Minister Hun Sen, Japanese Prime Minister Fumio Kishida and South Korean President Yoon Suk-yeol.
Joe Biden	November 13–16, 2022	Indonesia	Bali	Attended the 2022 G20 summit. Met with President Joko Widodo, Chinese President & CCP General Secretary Xi Jinping, European Commission President Ursula von der Leyen, Italian Prime Minister Giorgia Meloni and British Prime Minister Rishi Sunak.
Joe Biden	September 10–11, 2023	Vietnam	Hanoi	Met with General Secretary Nguyễn Phú Trọng, President Võ Văn Thưởng and Prime Minister Phạm Minh Chính.
Donald Trump	October 26–27, 2025	Malaysia	Kuala Lumpur	Attended the 47th ASEAN Summit. Also attended the signing ceremony of a Kuala Lumpur Peace Accord with Cambodian prime minister Hun Manet and Thai prime minister Anutin Charnvirakul at the Kuala Lumpur Convention Centre. Met with Prime Minister Anwar Ibrahim, Vietnamese prime minister Phạm Minh Chính, and Brazilian president Luiz Inácio Lula da Silva.
Donald Trump	November 17–18, 2026	Philippines	Manila, Parañaque	State visit. Attended the 49th ASEAN Summit and a Quadrilateral Security Dialogue (Quad) leaders' meeting, and signed a trade deal with Thailand, at Solaire Resort. Met with President Bongbong Marcos and First Lady Liza Araneta Marcos at Malacañang Palace.

== See also ==
- Foreign policy of the United States
- Foreign relations of the United States
