= Eighth East Asia Summit =

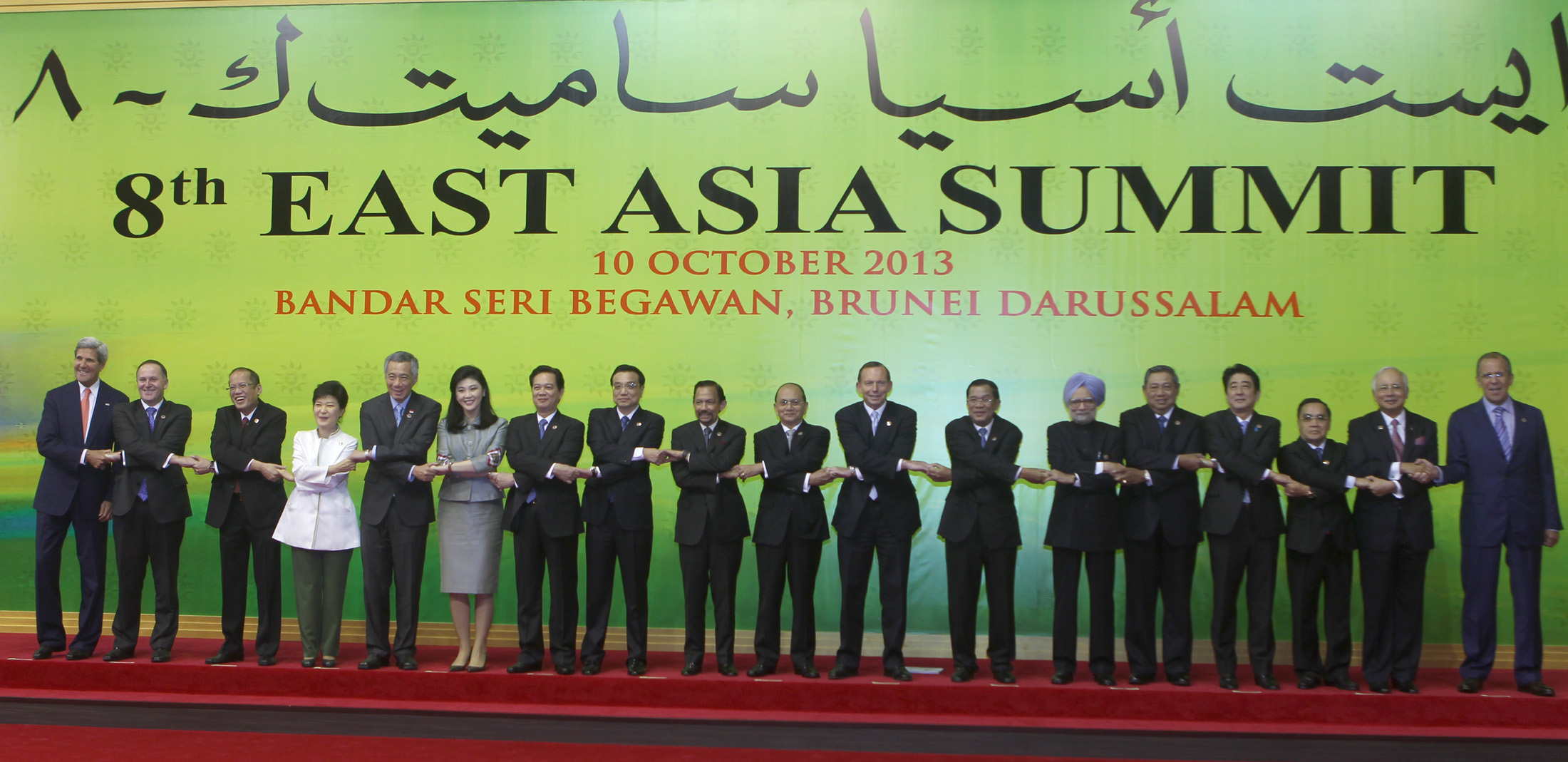
- Leaders at the summit.
- Host country: Brunei
- Date: October 9–10, 2013
- Cities: Bandar Seri Begawan
- Participants: EAS members
- Follows: Seventh East Asia Summit
- Precedes: Ninth East Asia Summit

The Eighth East Asia Summit was held in Bandar Seri Begawan, Brunei on October 9–10, 2013. The East Asia Summit is an annual meeting of national leaders from the East Asian region and adjoining countries.

== Attending delegations ==
The heads of state and heads of government of eighteen countries took part in the summit.

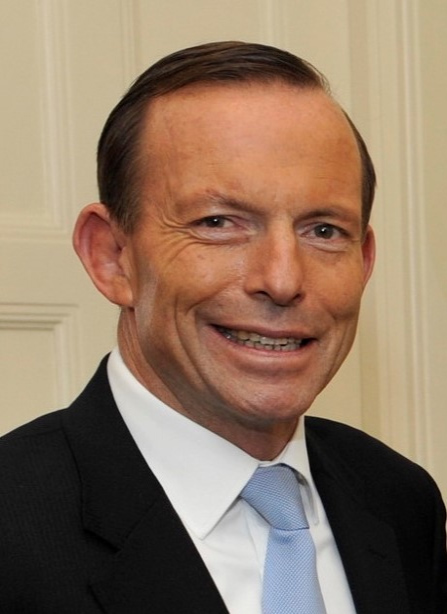
(Australia) Australia
Tony Abbott
Prime Minister

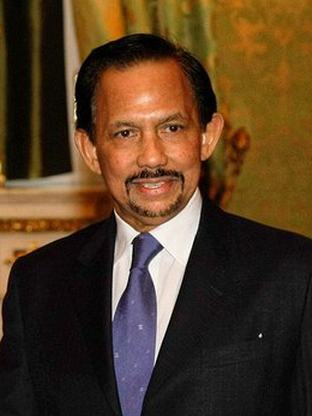
(Brunei) Brunei
Hassanal Bolkiah
Sultan & Prime Minister
(chairperson)

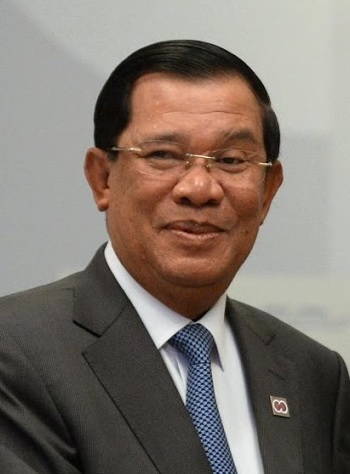
Cambodia
Hun Sen
Prime Minister

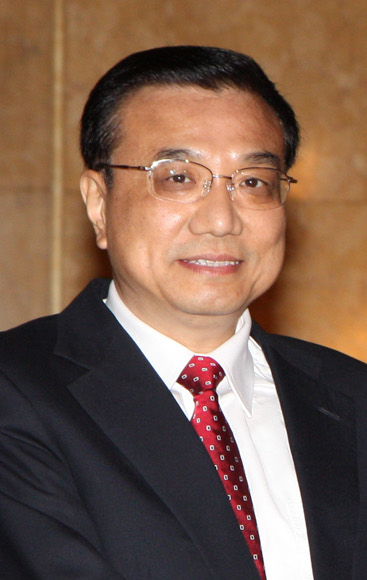
(China) China
Li Keqiang
Premier

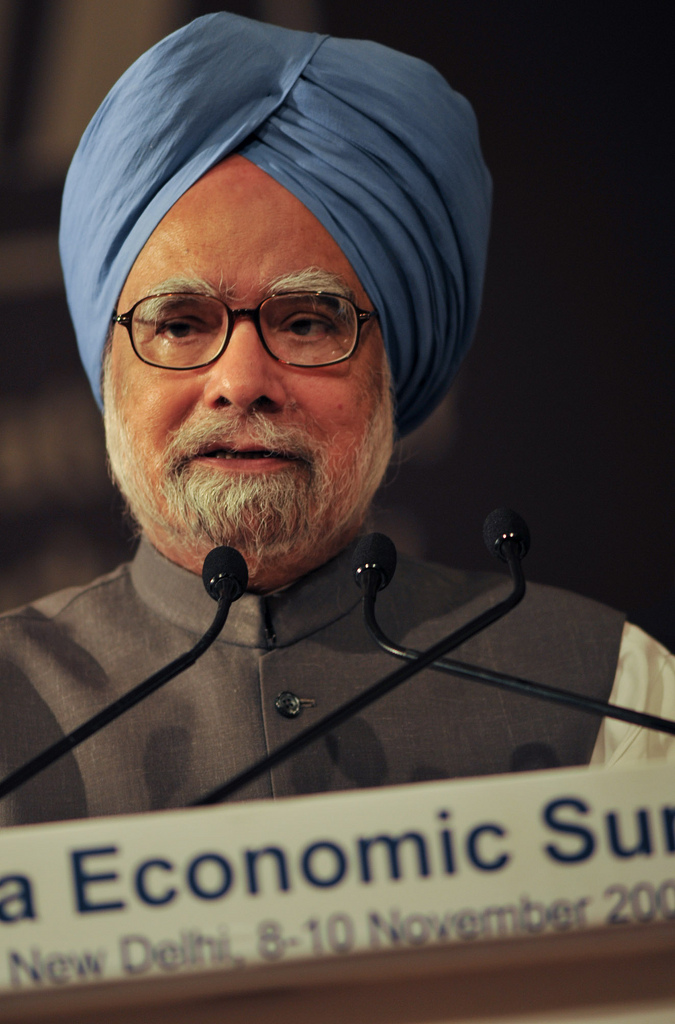
(India) India
Manmohan Singh
Prime Minister

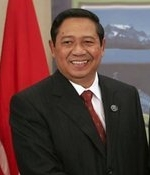
(Indonesia) Indonesia
Susilo Bambang Yudhoyono
President

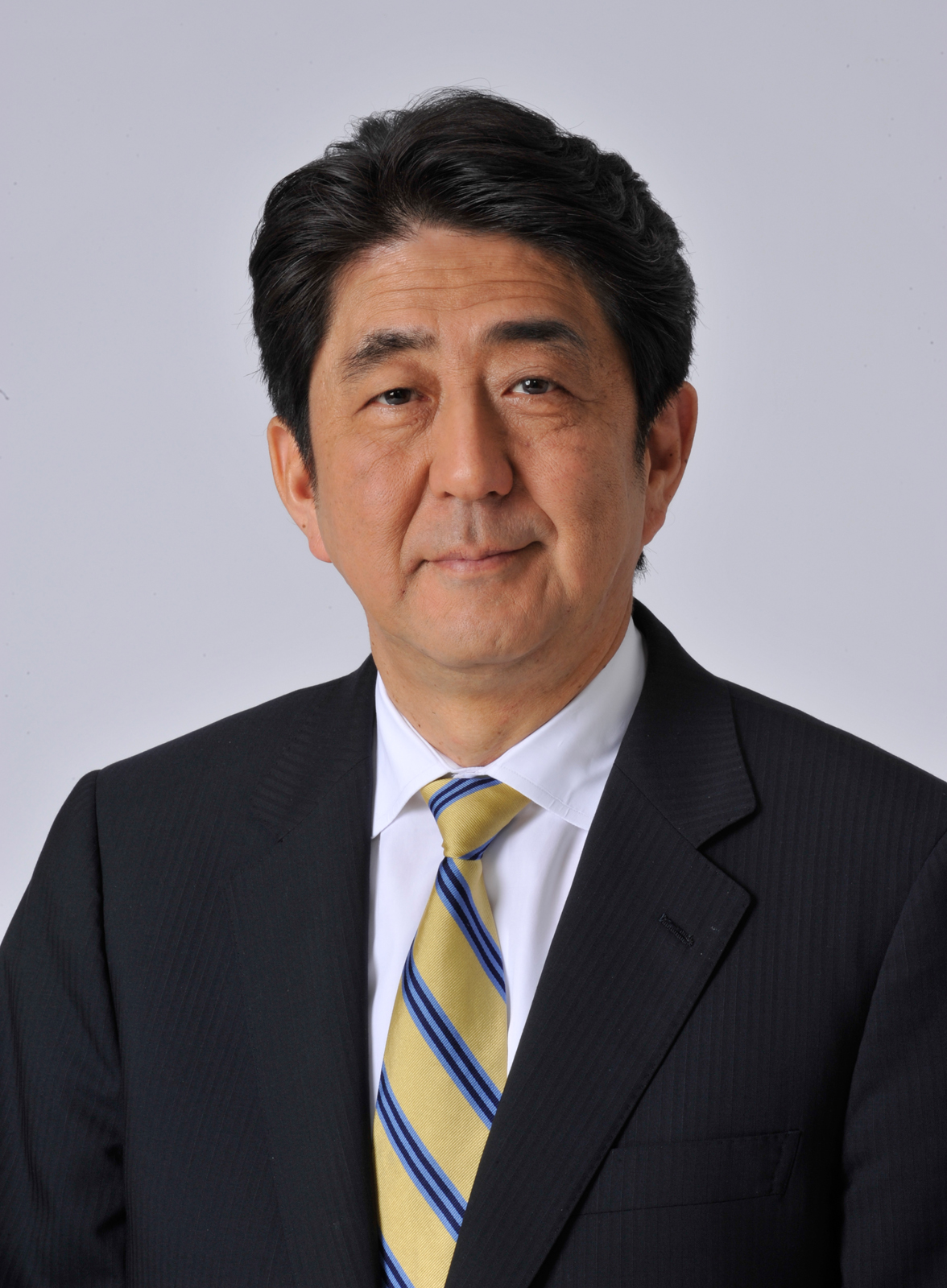
(Japan) Japan
Shinzō Abe
Prime Minister

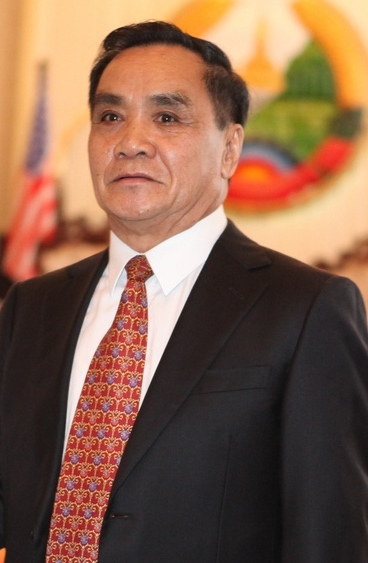
(Laos) Laos
Thongsing Thammavong
Prime Minister

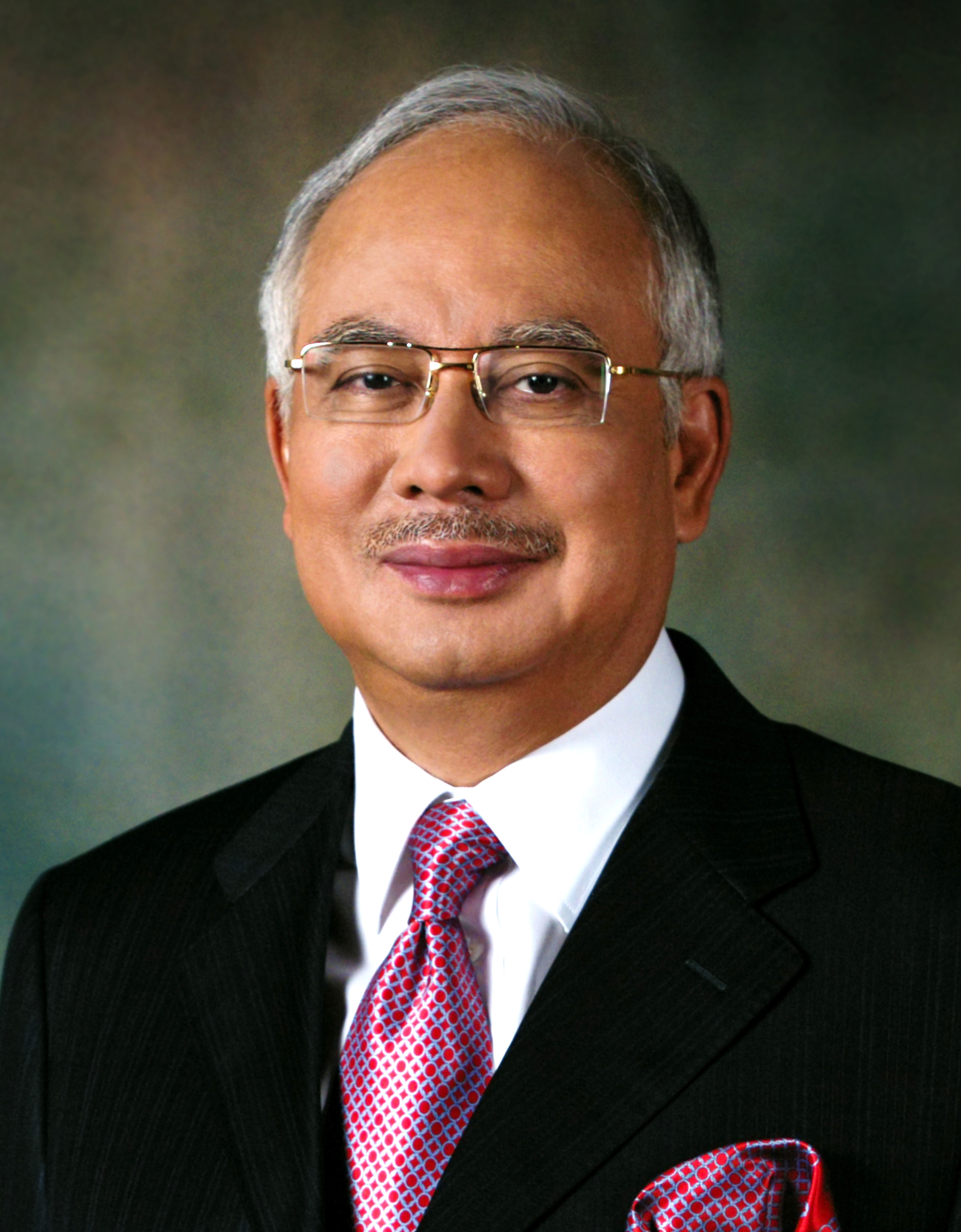
(Malaysia) Malaysia
Najib Razak
Prime Minister

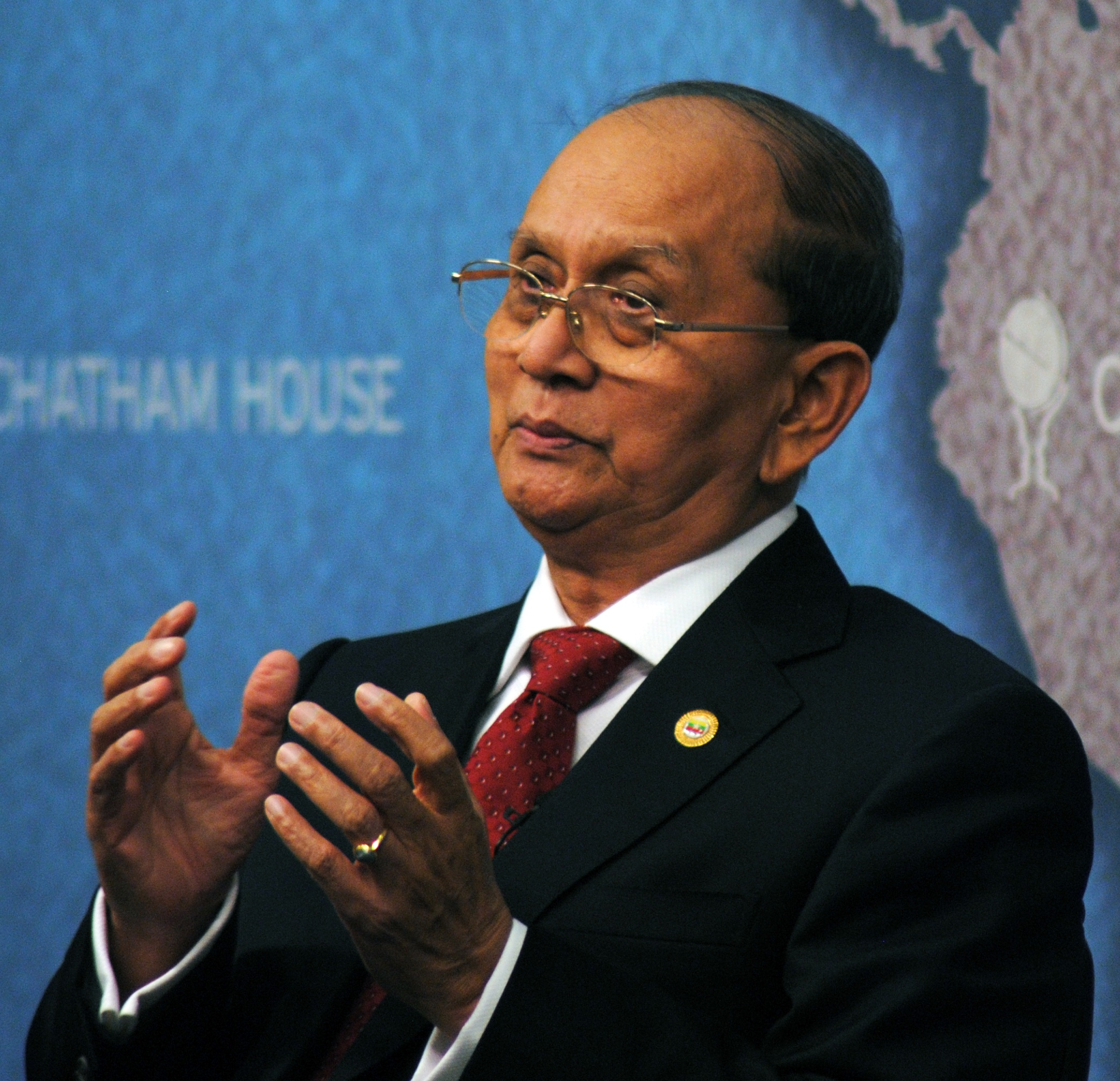
Myanmar
Thein Sein
President

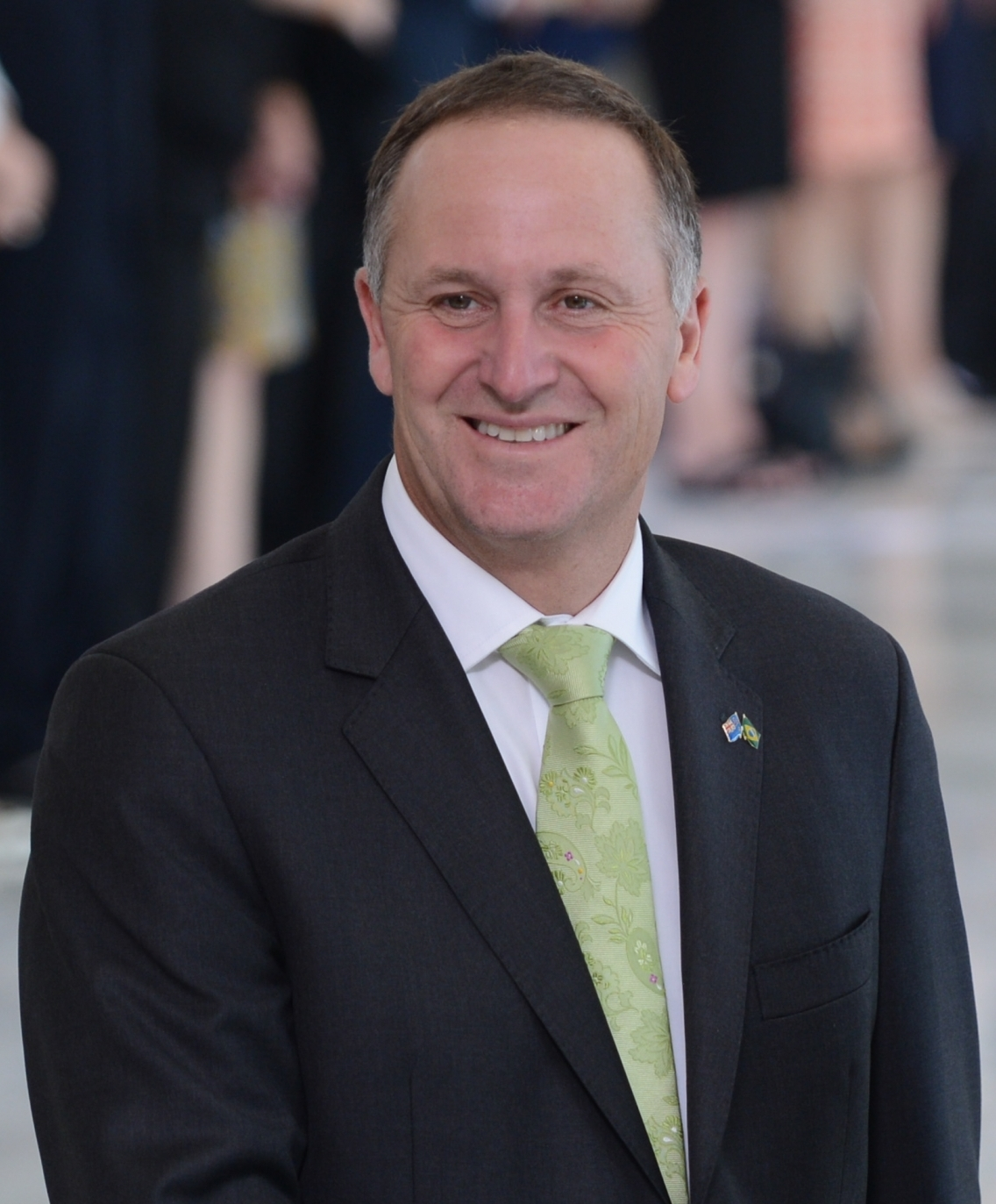
(New Zealand) New Zealand
John Key
Prime Minister

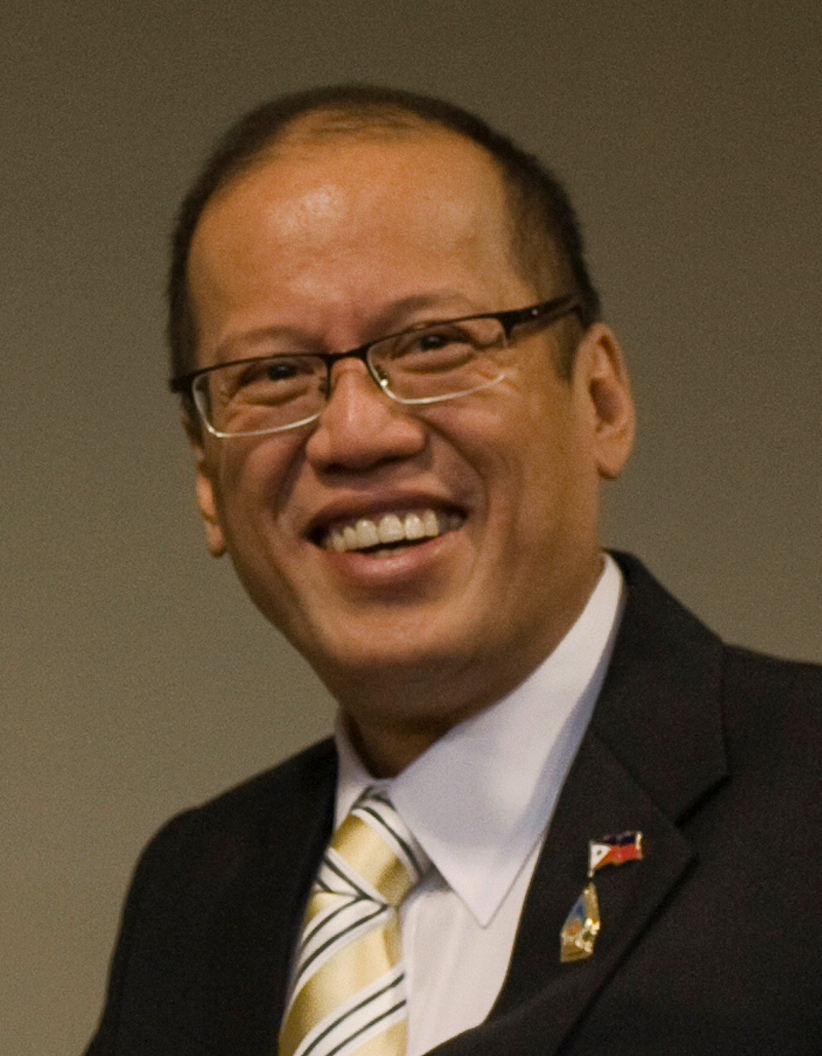
(Philippines) Philippines
Benigno Aquino III
President

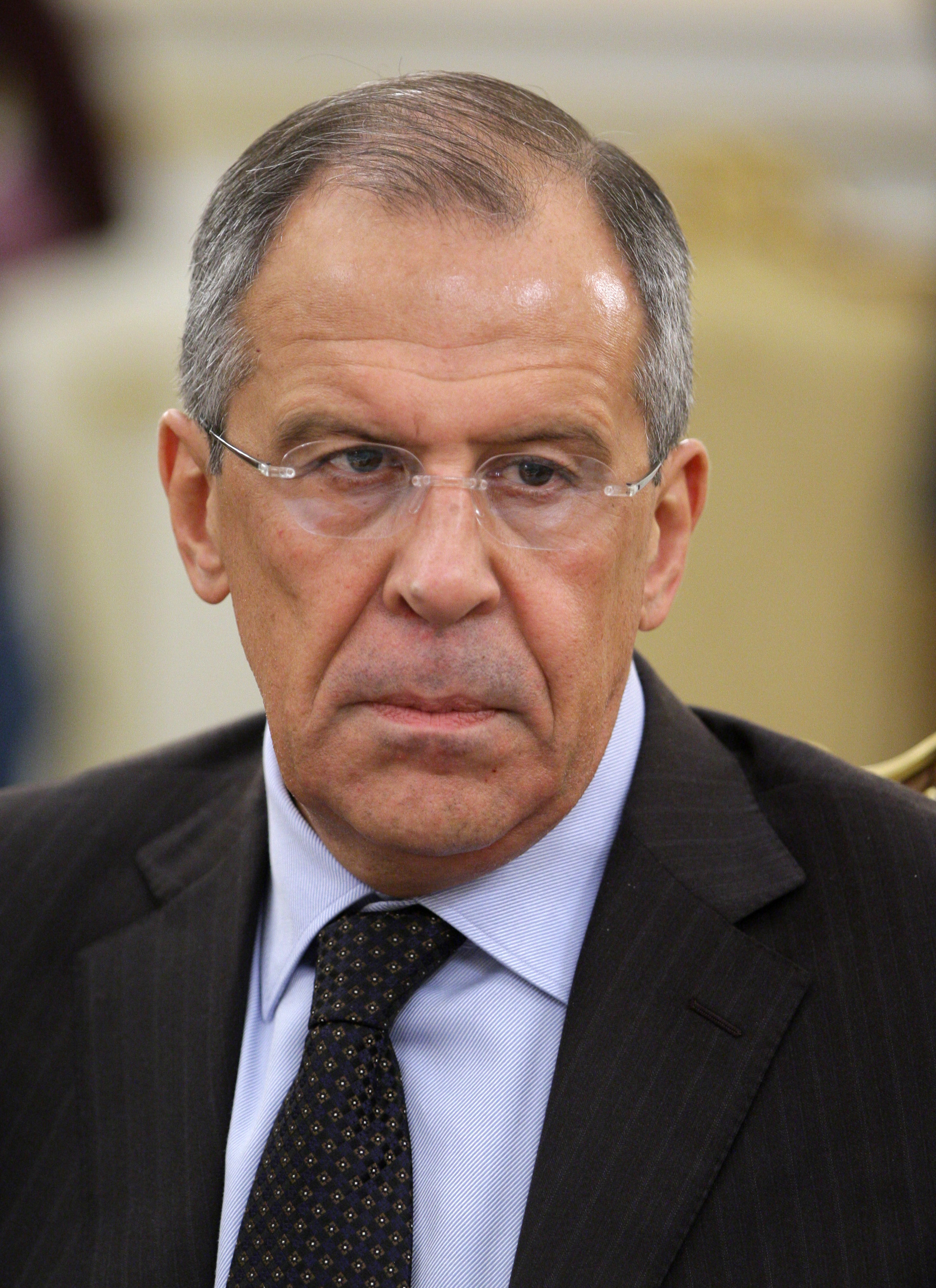
Russia
Sergey Lavrov
Foreign Minister

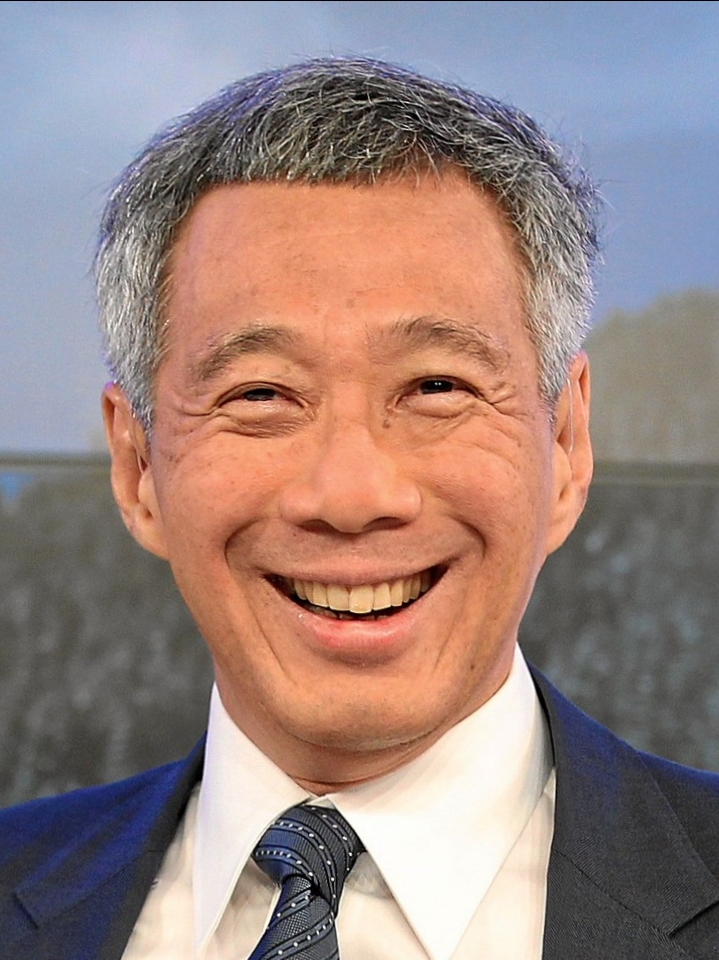
(Singapore) Singapore
Lee Hsien Loong
Prime Minister

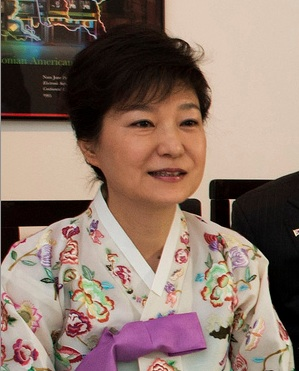
South Korea
Park Geun-hye
President

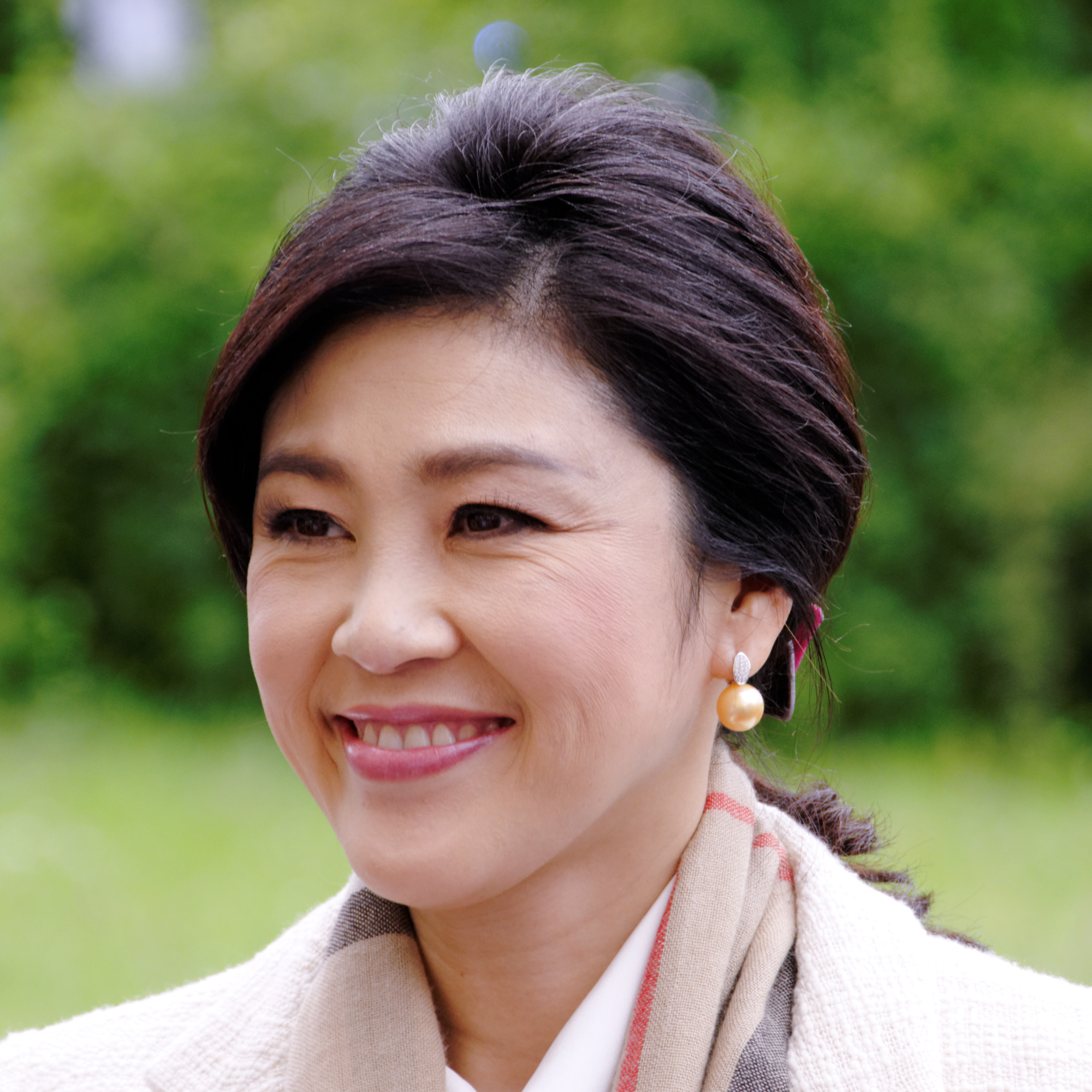
(Thailand) Thailand
Yingluck Shinawatra
Prime Minister

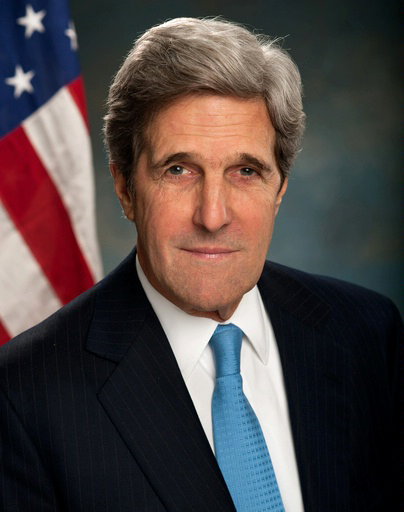
(United States) United States
John Kerry
Secretary of State

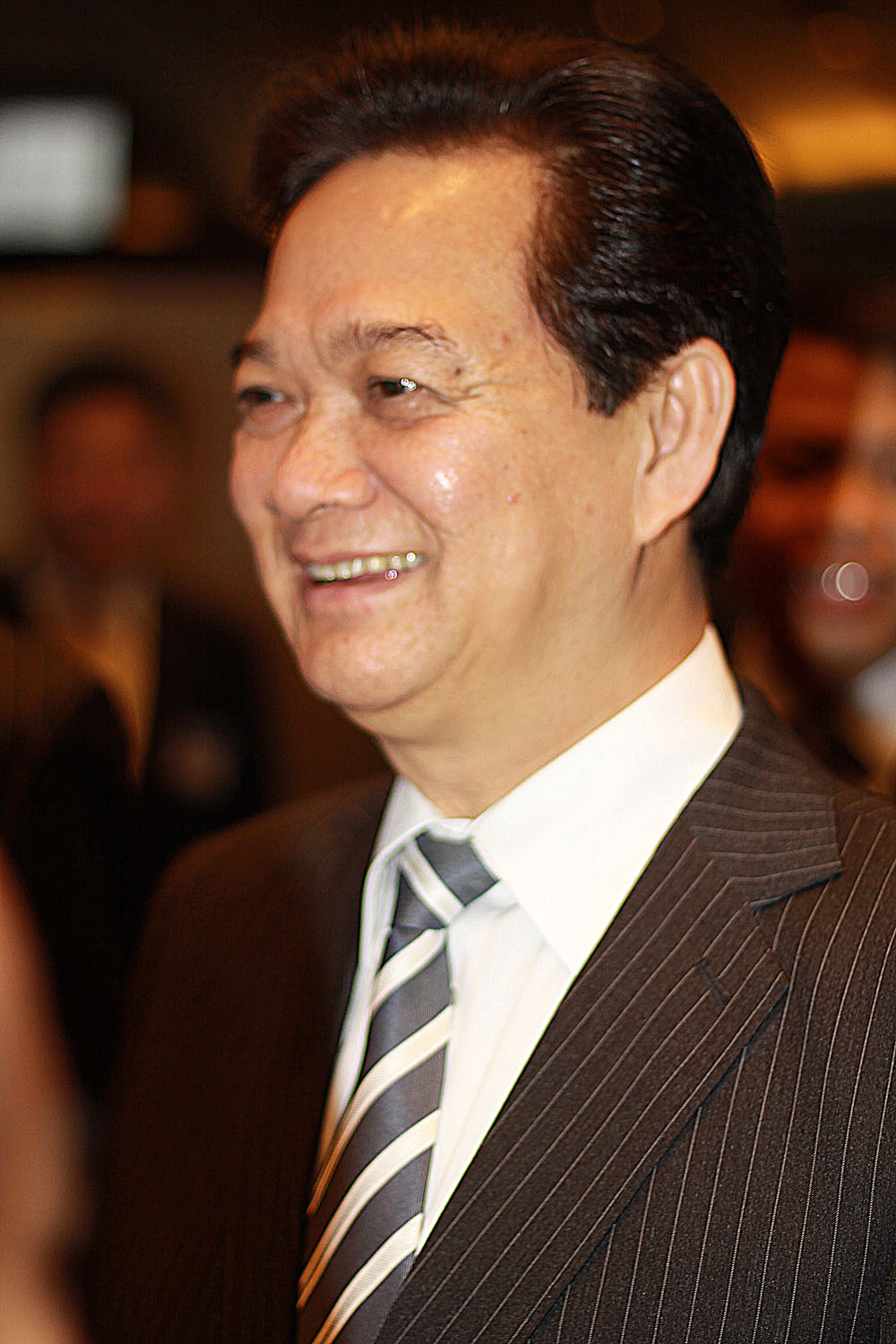
Vietnam
Nguyễn Tấn Dũng
Prime Minister

== Outcomes ==
Russian President Vladimir Putin did not attend and was represented by Foreign Minister Sergei Lavrov. US President Barack Obama did not attend due to the United States federal government shutdown of 2013 and was represented by Secretary of State John Kerry. The other members' leaders attended.
