= Ninth East Asia Summit =

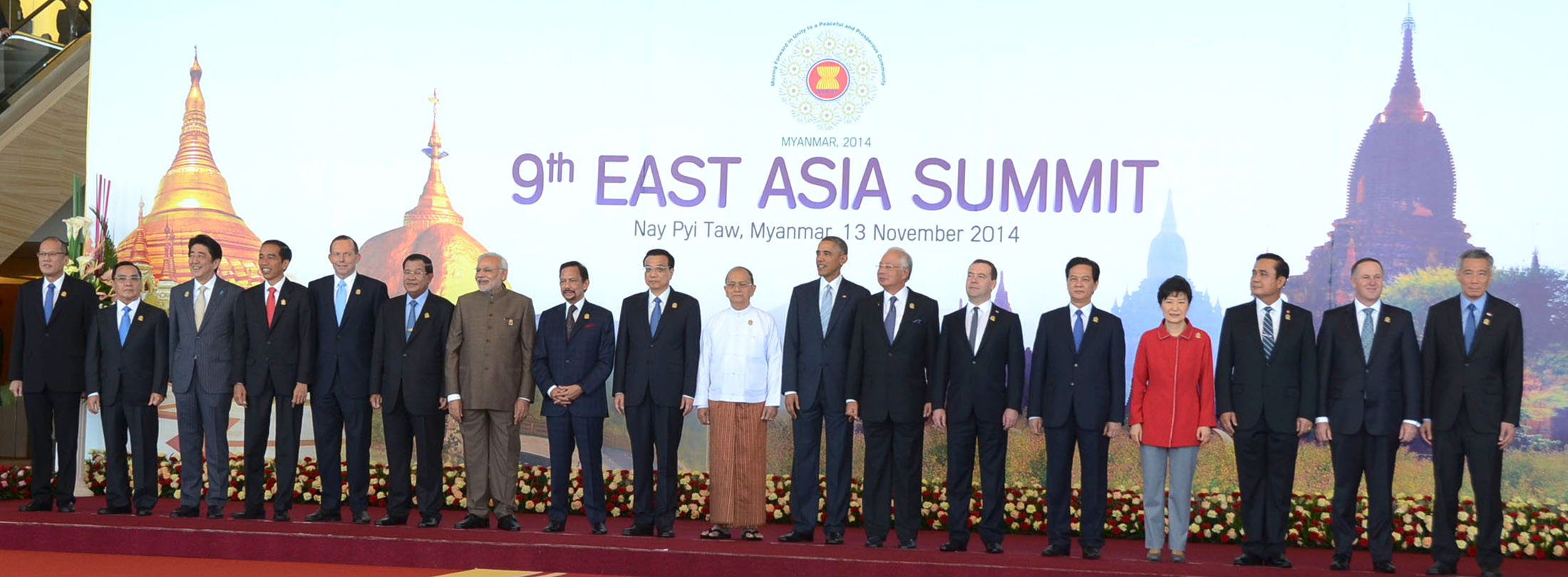
- Leaders at the summit.
- Host country: Myanmar (Burma)
- Date: November 12–14, 2014
- Cities: Nay Pyi Taw
- Participants: EAS members
- Follows: Eighth East Asia Summit
- Precedes: Tenth East Asia Summit

The Ninth East Asia Summit was held in Nay Pyi Taw, Myanmar (Burma) on November 12–14, 2014. The East Asia Summit is an annual meeting of national leaders from the East Asian region and adjoining countries.

== Attending delegations ==
The heads of state and heads of government of the eighteen countries were participated in the summit.

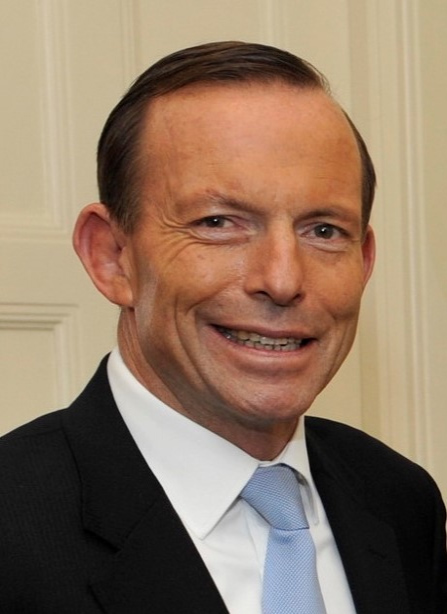
(Australia) Australia
Tony Abbott
Prime Minister

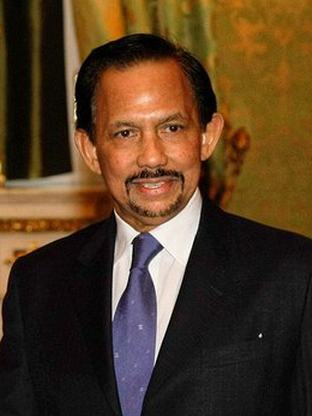
(Brunei) Brunei
Hassanal Bolkiah
Sultan & Prime Minister

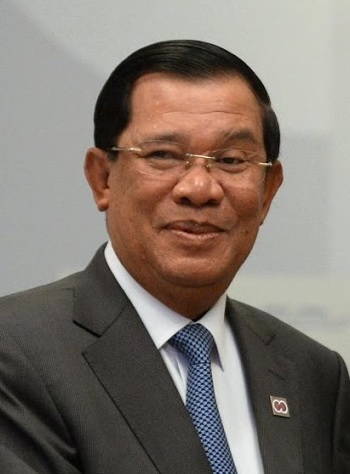
Cambodia
Hun Sen
Prime Minister

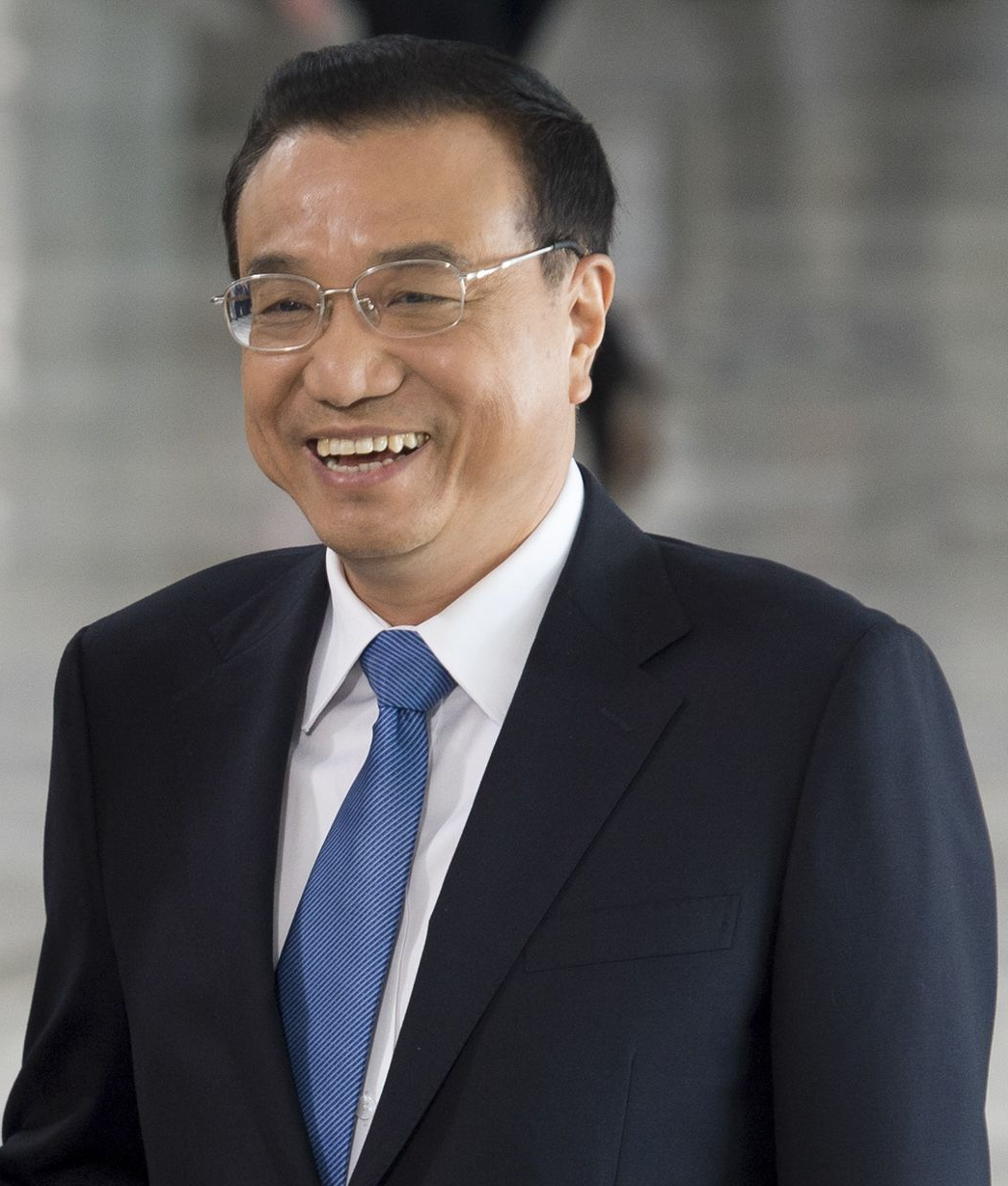
(China) China
Li Keqiang
Premier

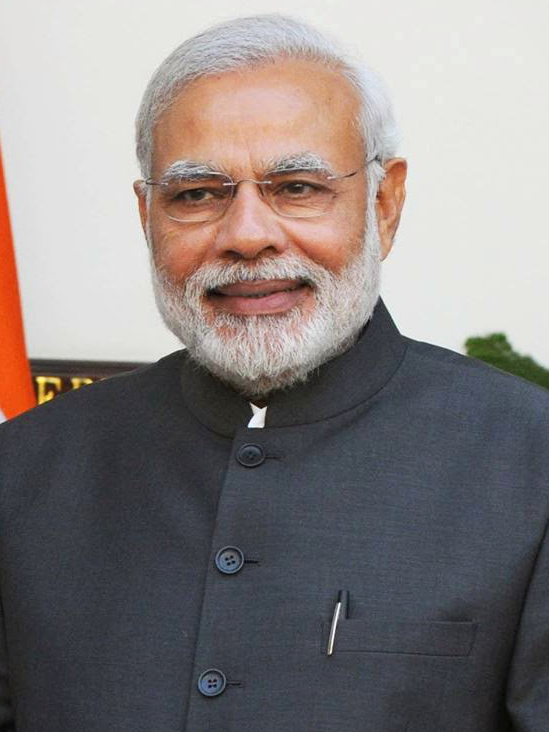
(India) India
Narendra Modi
Prime Minister

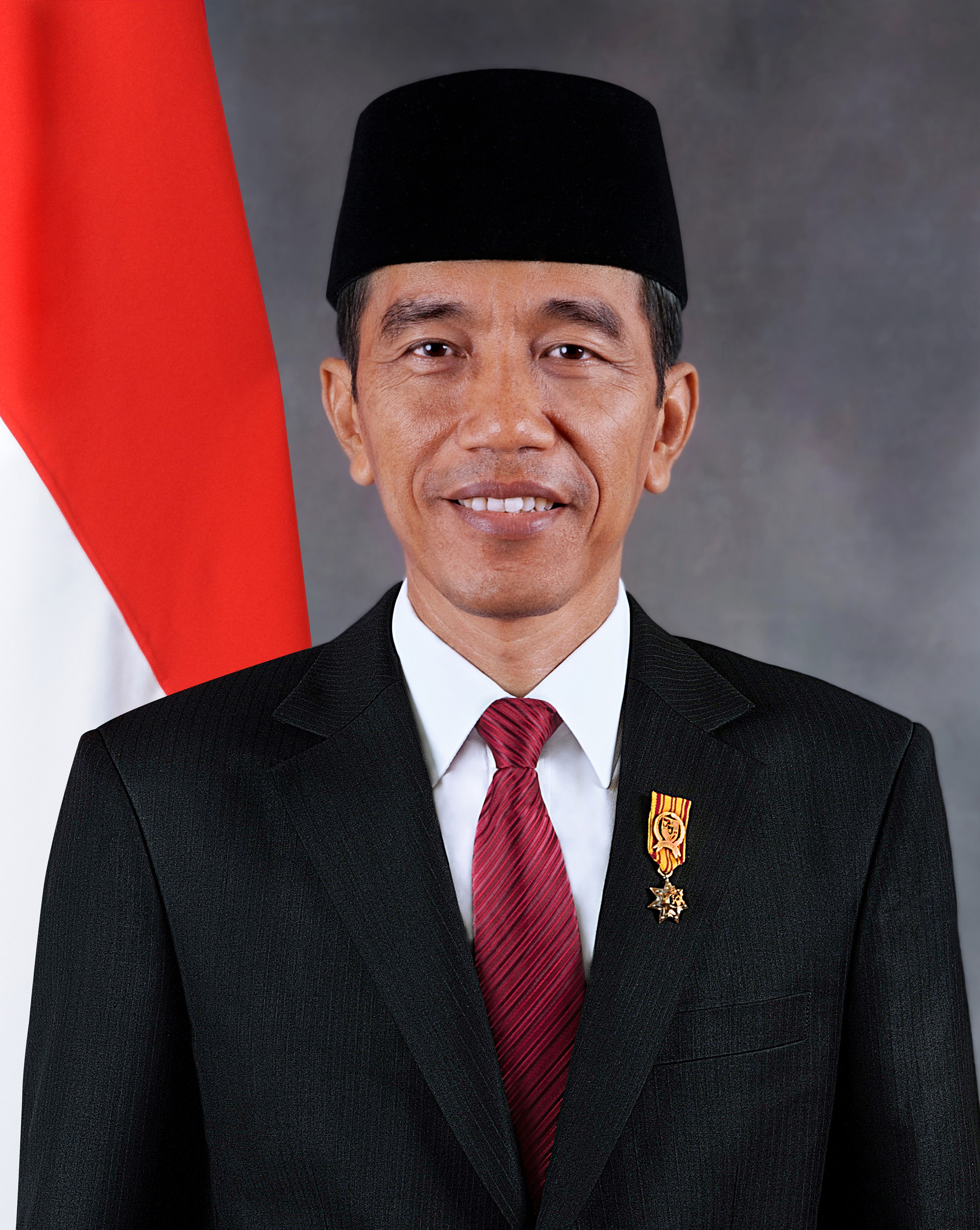
(Indonesia) Indonesia
Joko Widodo
President

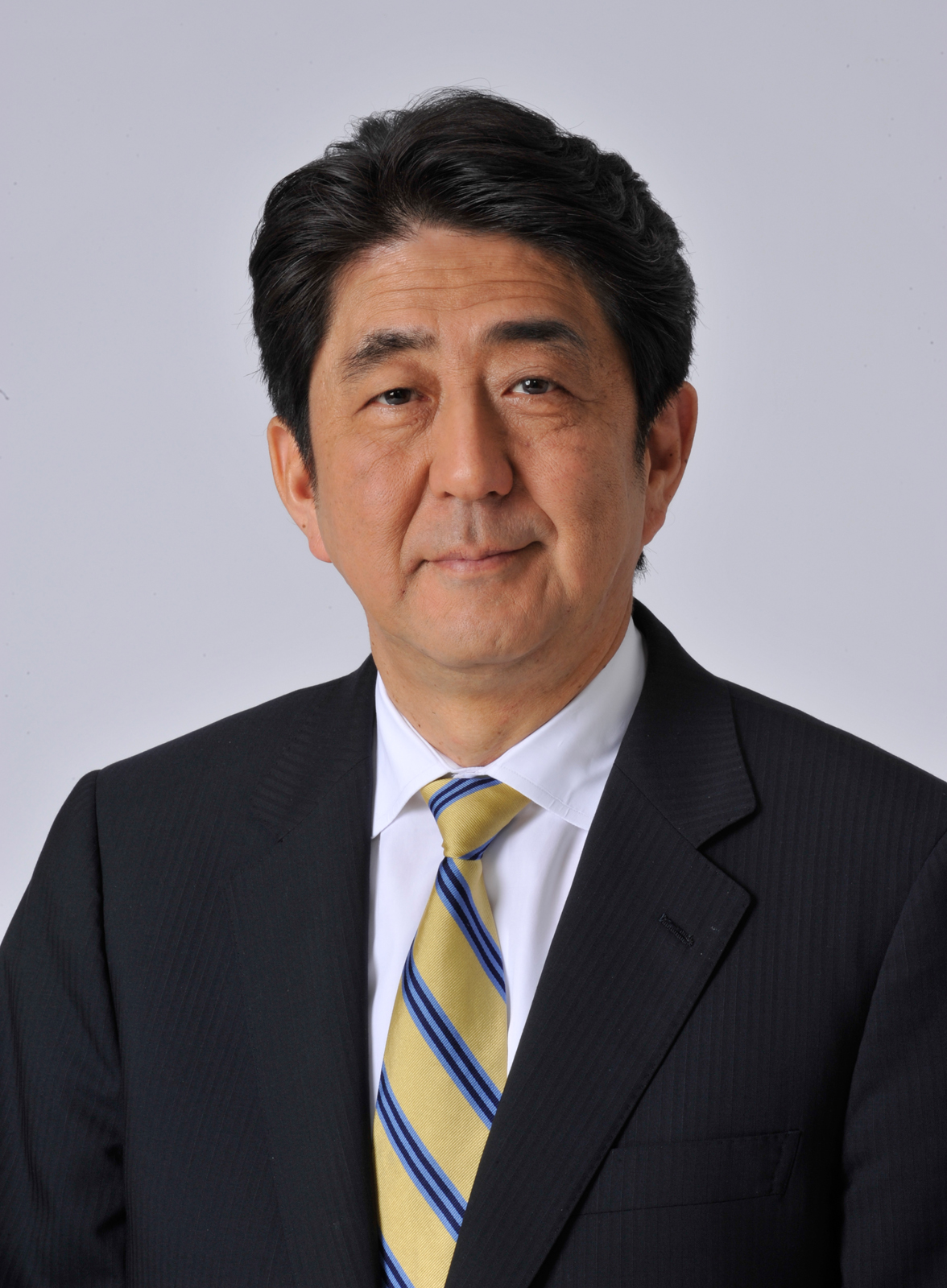
(Japan) Japan
Shinzō Abe
Prime Minister

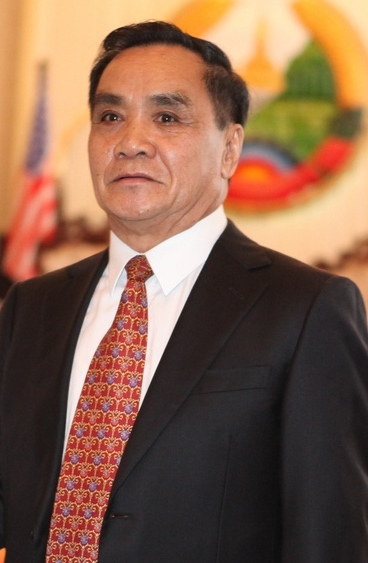
(Laos) Laos
Thongsing Thammavong
Prime Minister

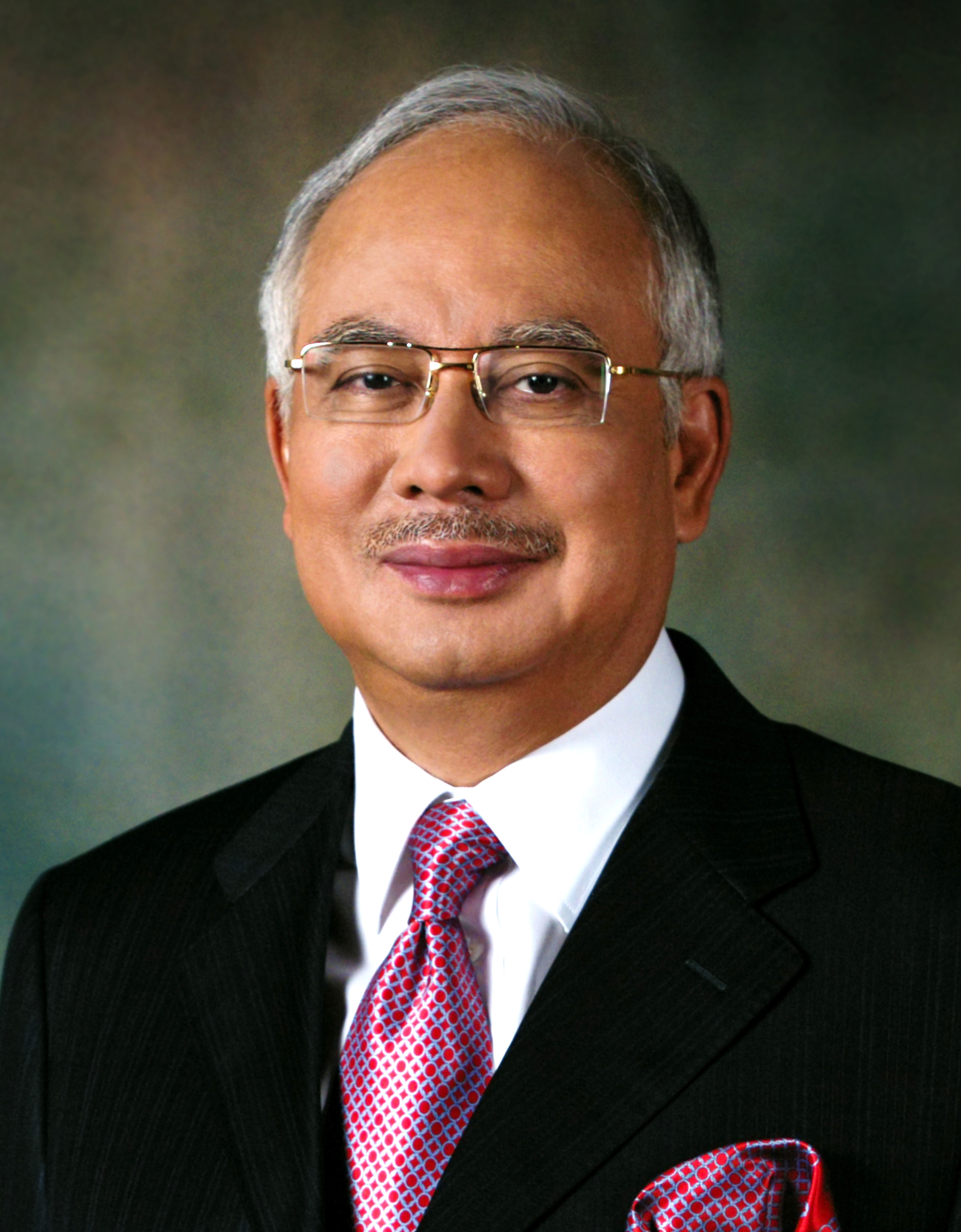
(Malaysia) Malaysia
Najib Razak
Prime Minister

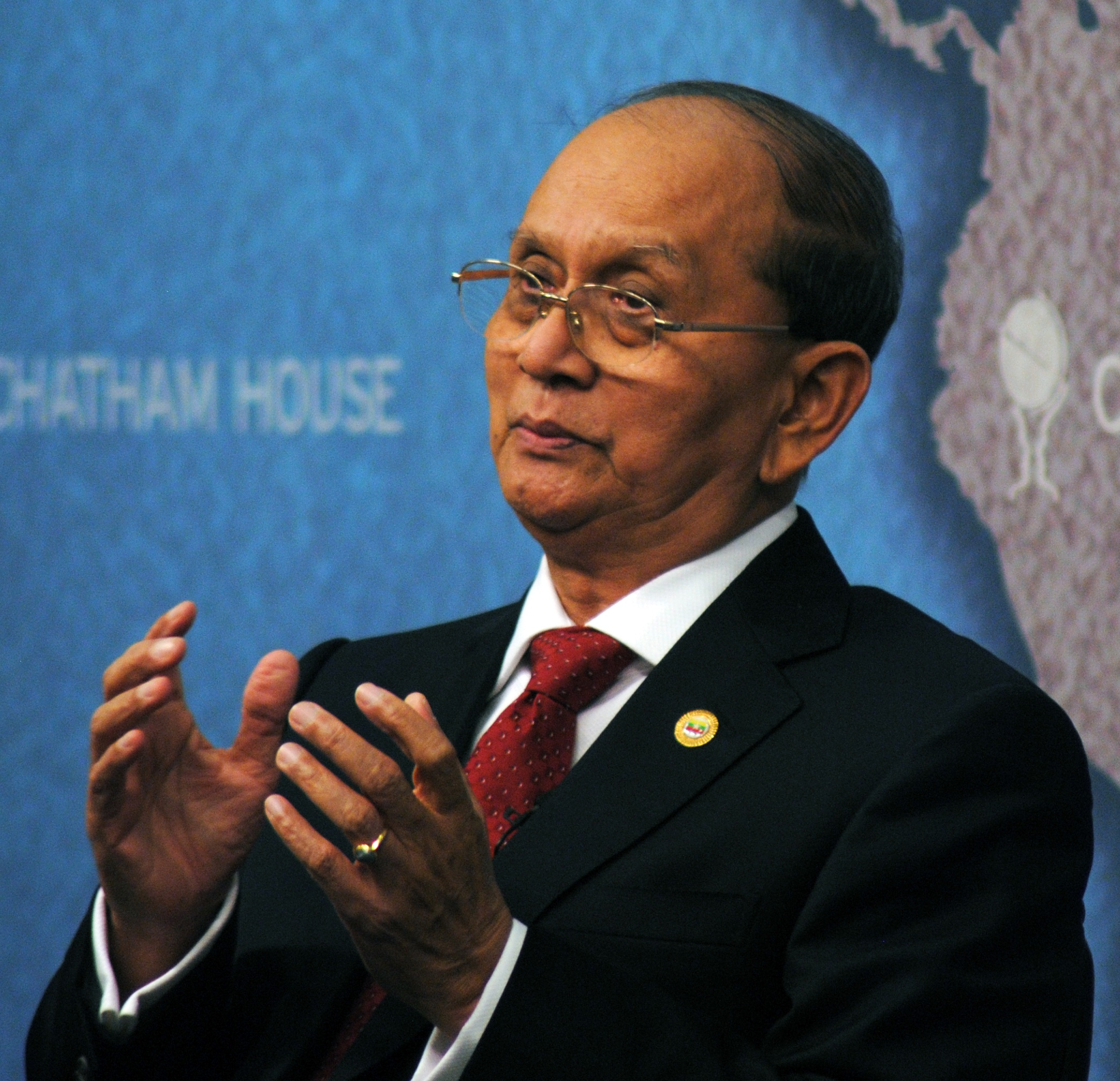
Myanmar
Thein Sein
President
(Chairperson)

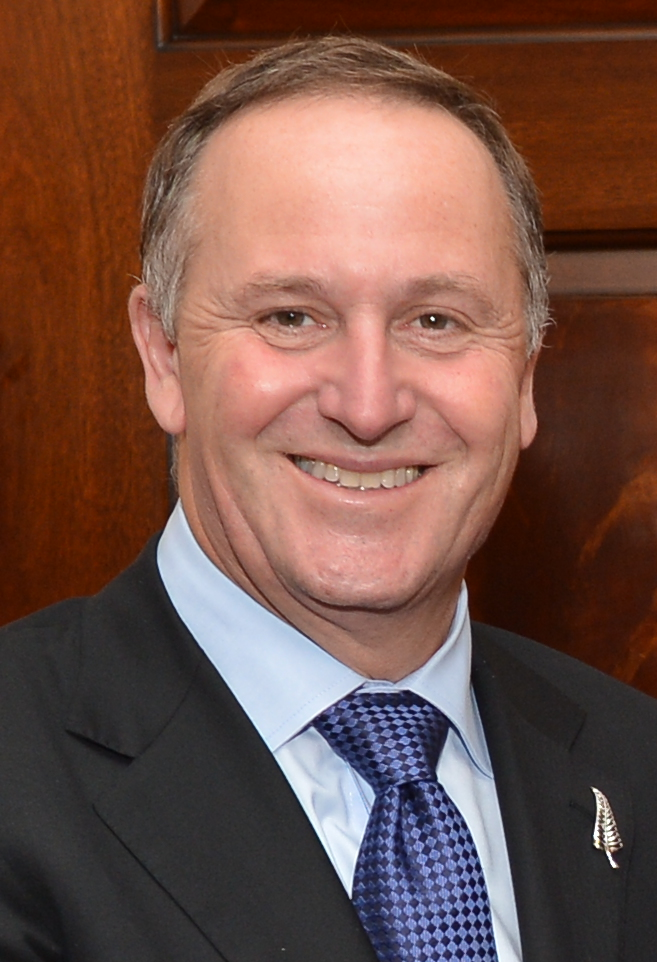
(New Zealand) New Zealand
John Key
Prime Minister

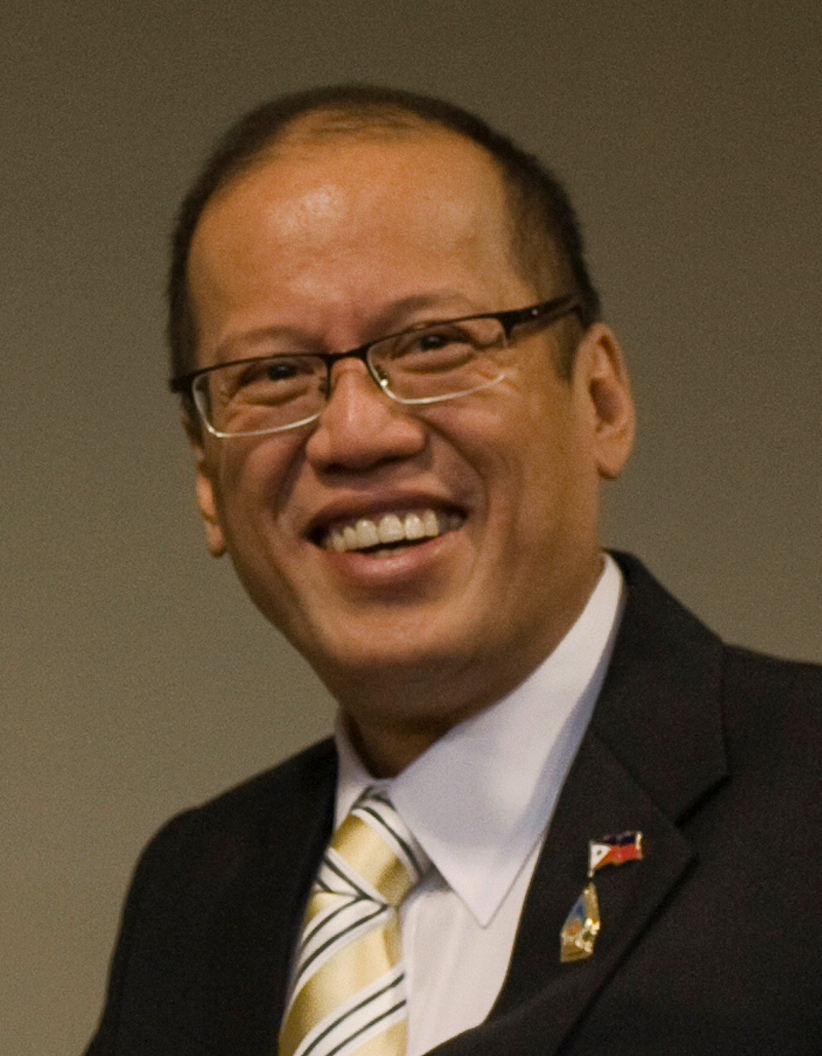
(Philippines) Philippines
Benigno Aquino III
President

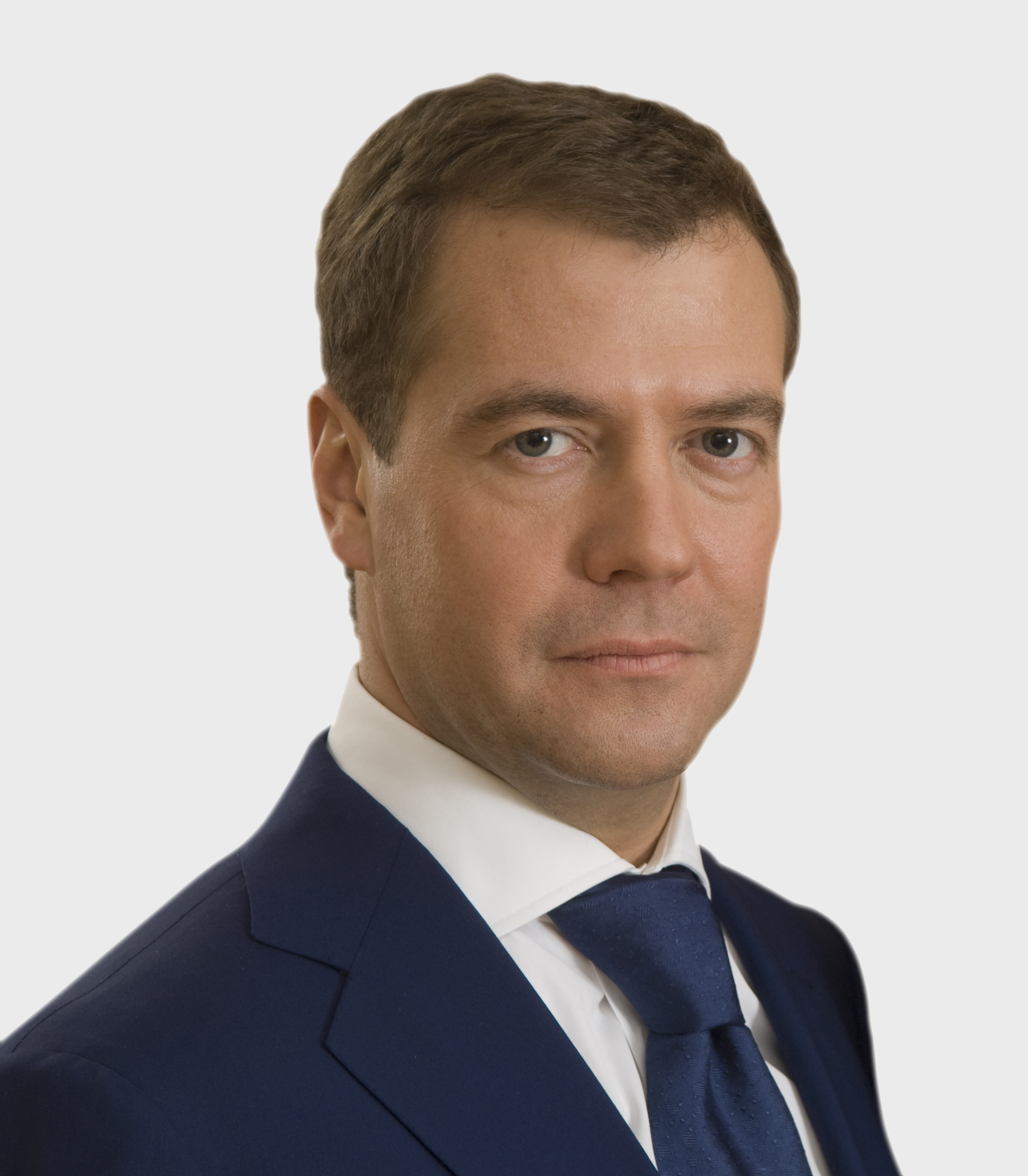
(Russia) Russia
Dmitry Medvedev
Prime Minister

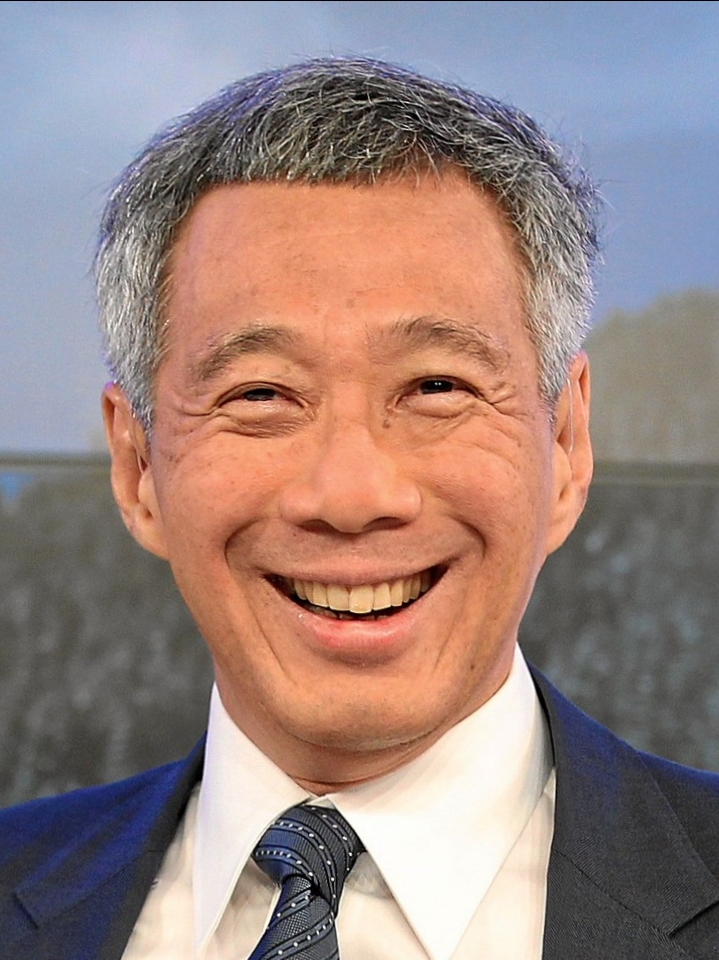
(Singapore) Singapore
Lee Hsien Loong
Prime Minister

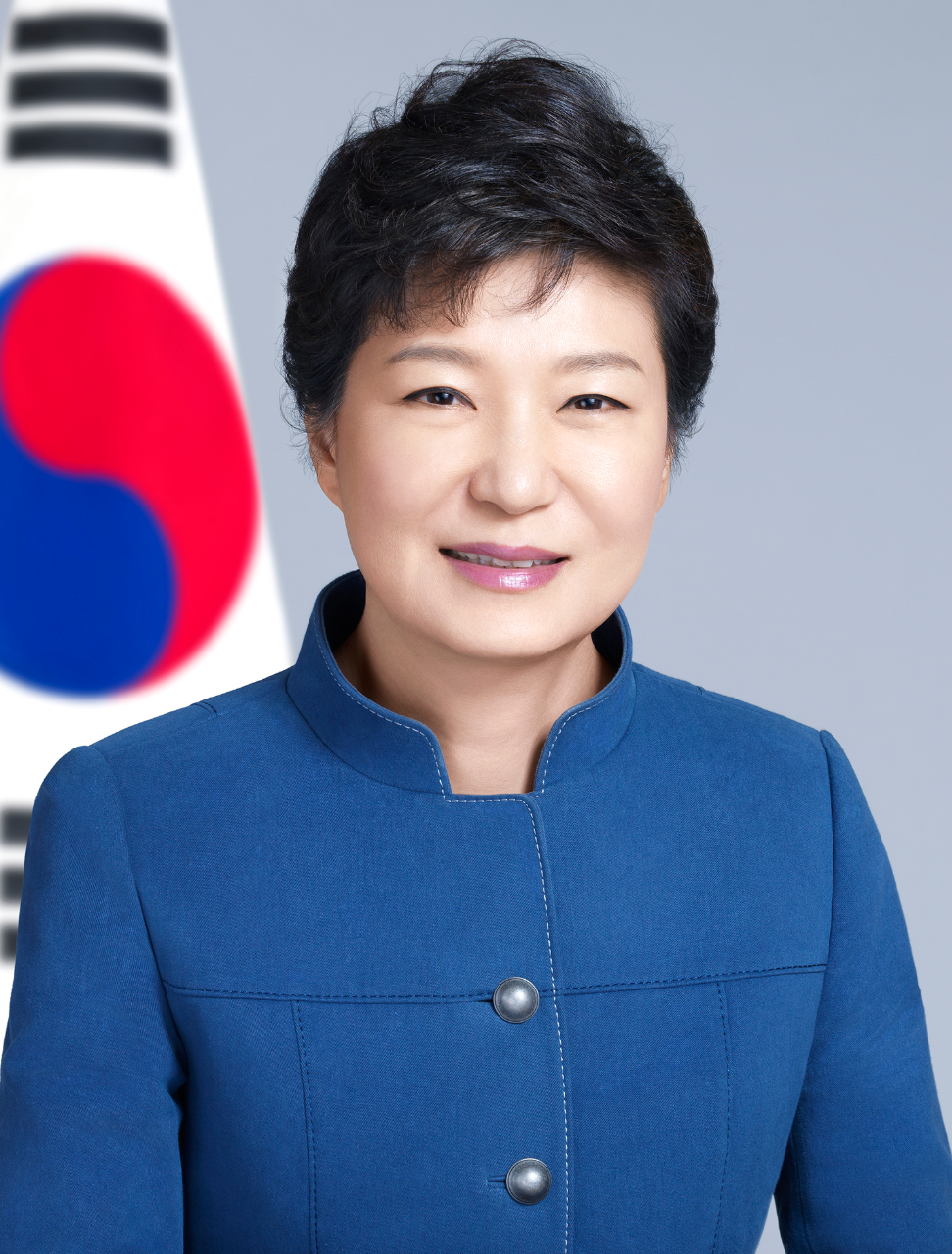
South Korea
Park Geun-hye
President

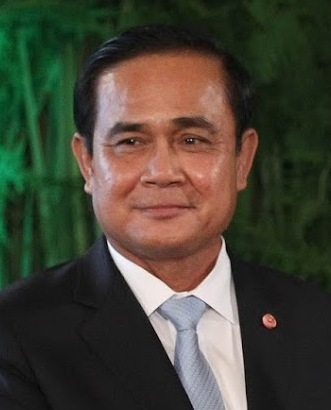
(Thailand) Thailand
Prayuth Chan-ocha
Prime Minister

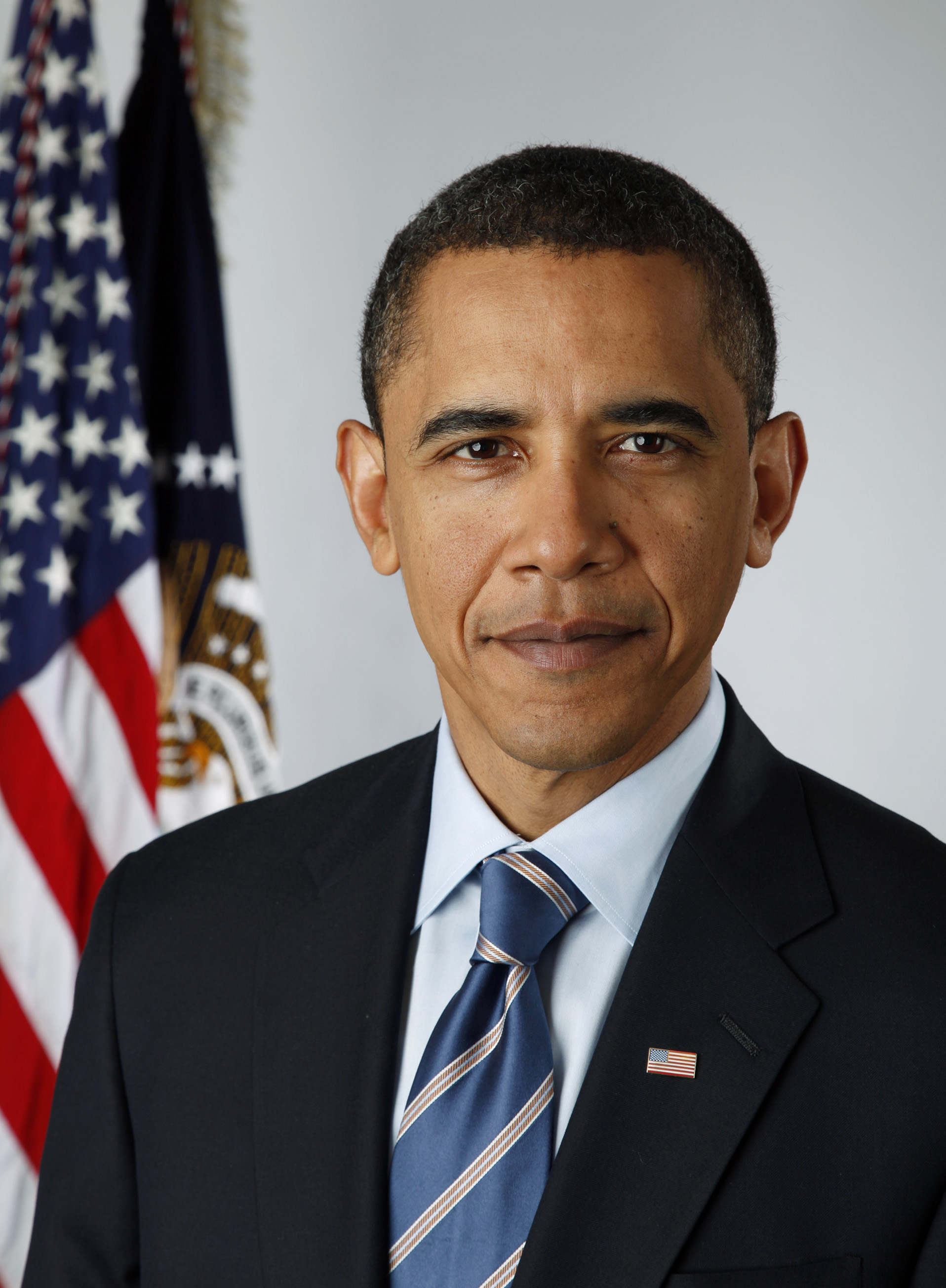
(United States) United States
Barack Obama
President

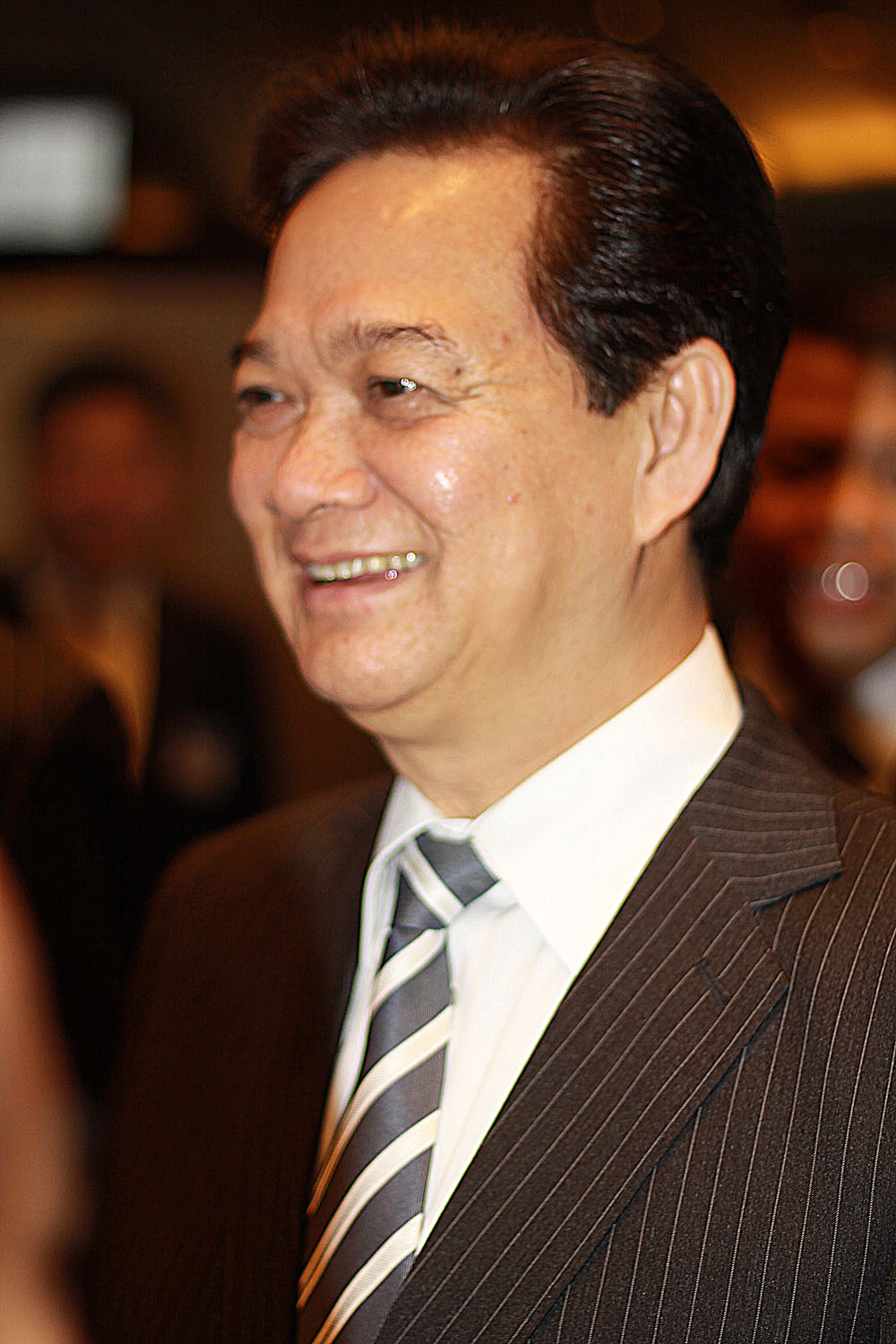
Vietnam
Nguyễn Tấn Dũng
Prime Minister

== Agenda ==
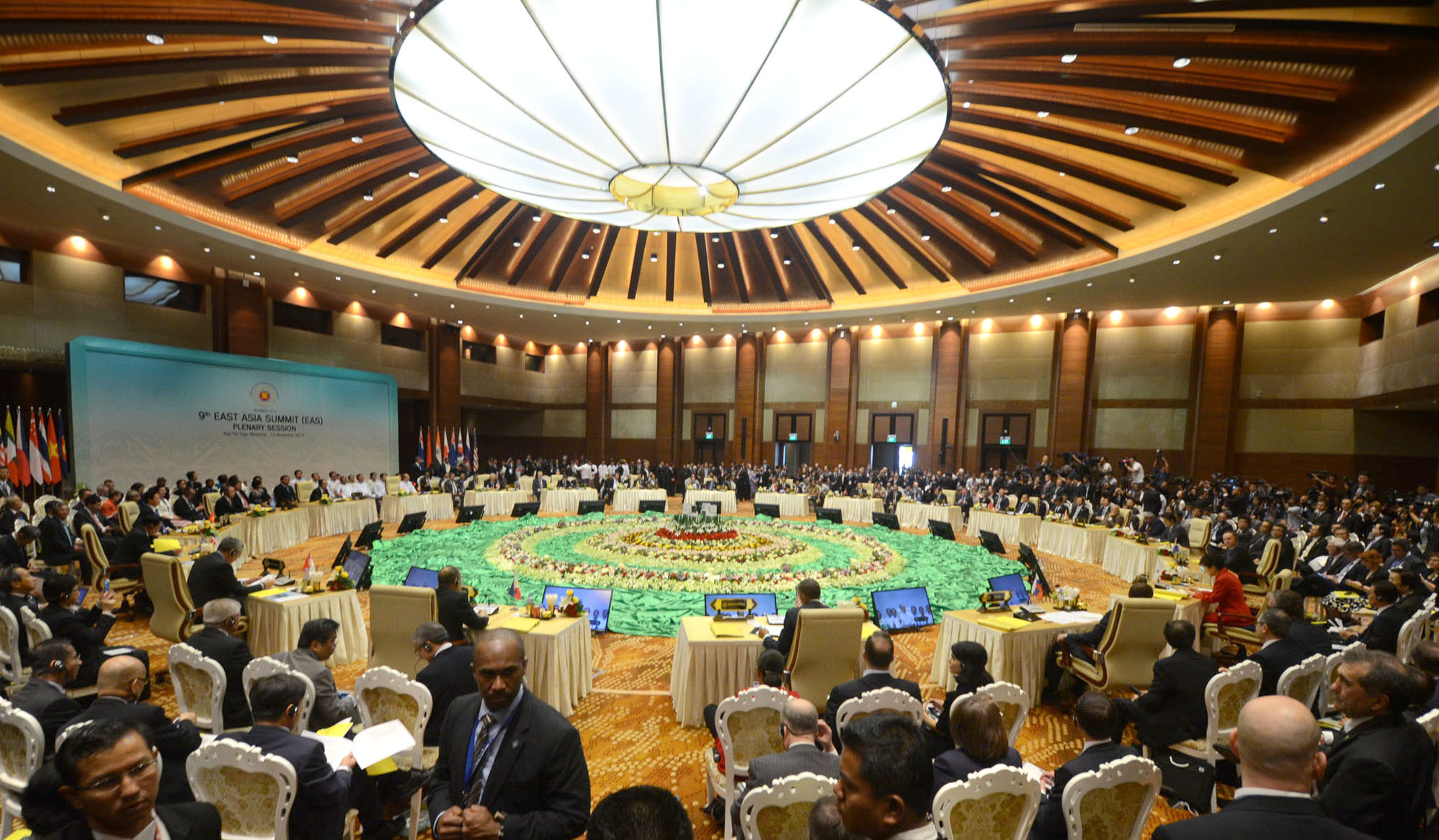
East Asia Summit Session

All the countries supported the East Asia summit declaration on Islamic State (terror group). And also asserted that an international partnership is required for a comprehensive response against terrorism. The summit also rejected any linkage between religion and terrorism. They have also said that it should be ensured that cyberspace and space remain a source of connectivity and prosperity and not new threats of conflicts.
