= Seventh East Asia Summit =

- Host country: Cambodia
- Date: November 19–20, 2012
- Cities: Phnom Penh
- Participants: EAS members
- Follows: Sixth East Asia Summit
- Precedes: Eighth East Asia Summit

The Seventh East Asia Summit was held in Phnom Penh, Cambodia on November 19–20, 2012. The East Asia Summit is an annual meeting of national leaders from the East Asian region and adjoining countries.

== Attending delegations ==
The heads of state and heads of government of the eighteen countries participated in the summit.

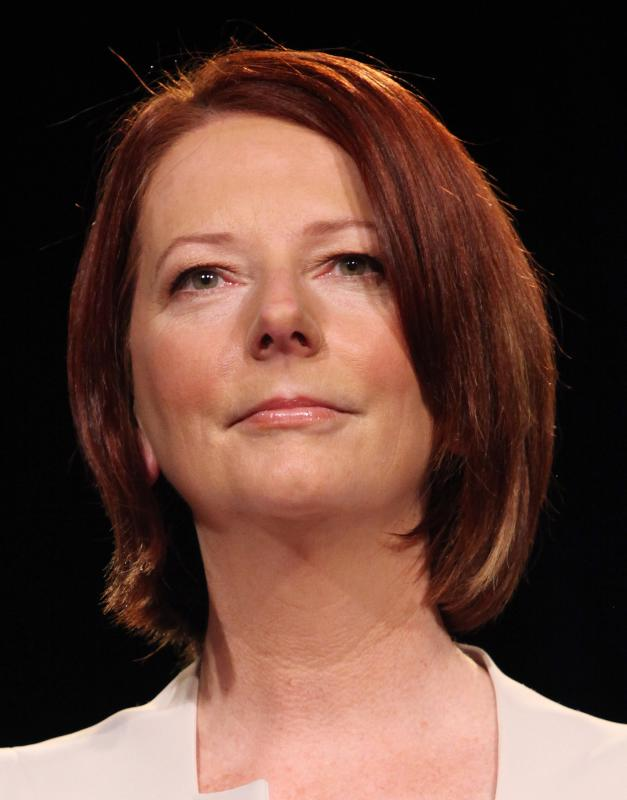
(Australia) Julia Gillard
Prime Minister

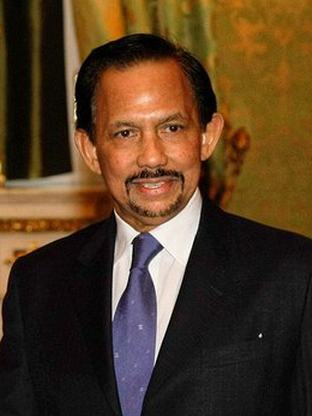
(Brunei) Hassanal Bolkiah
Sultan & Prime Minister

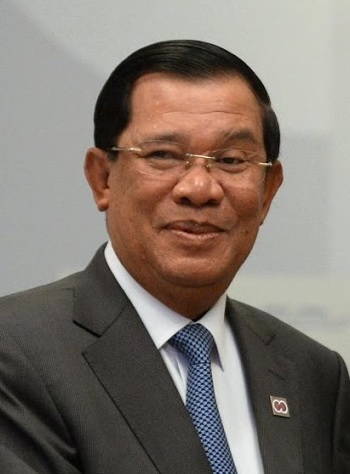
(Cambodia) Hun Sen
Prime Minister
(Chairperson)

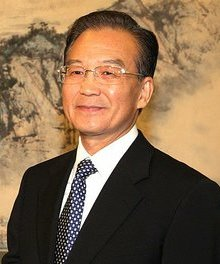
(China) Wen Jiabao
Premier

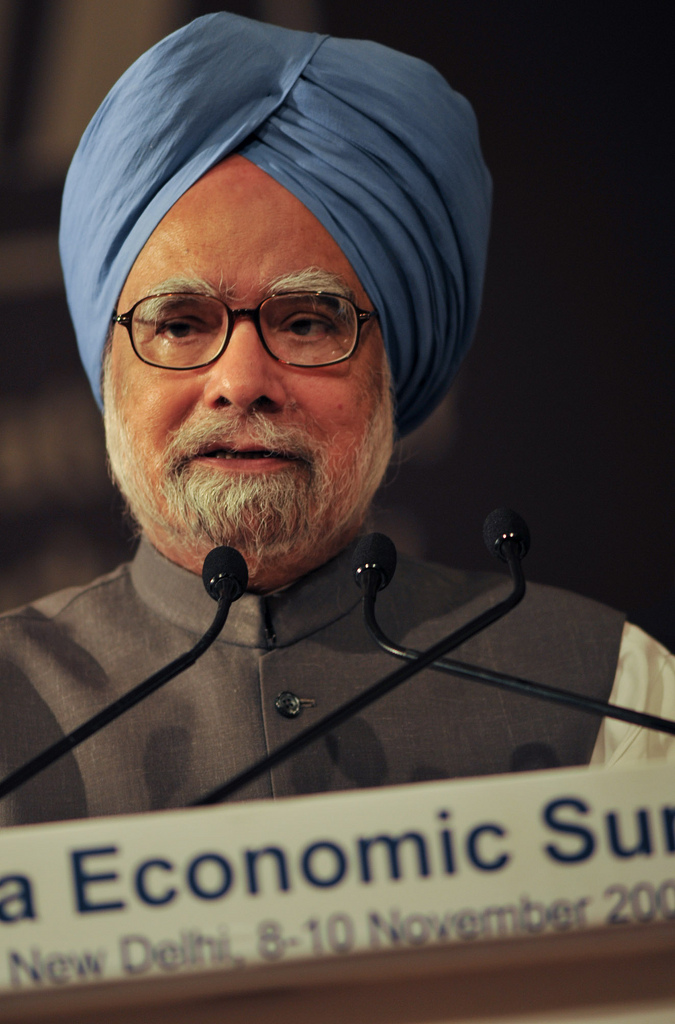
(India) Manmohan Singh
Prime Minister

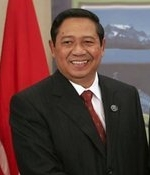
(Indonesia) Susilo Bambang Yudhoyono
President

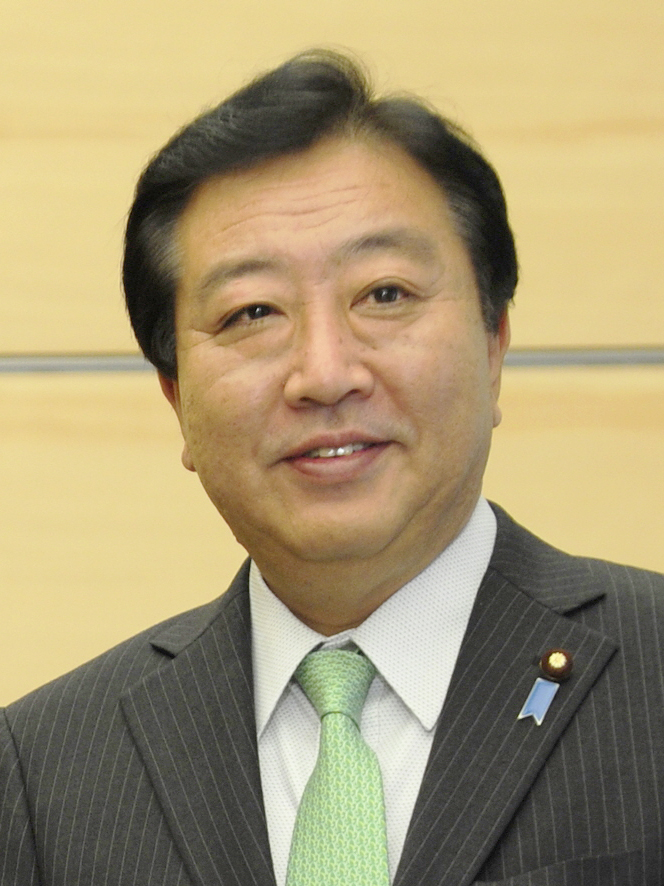
(Japan) Yoshihiko Noda
Prime Minister

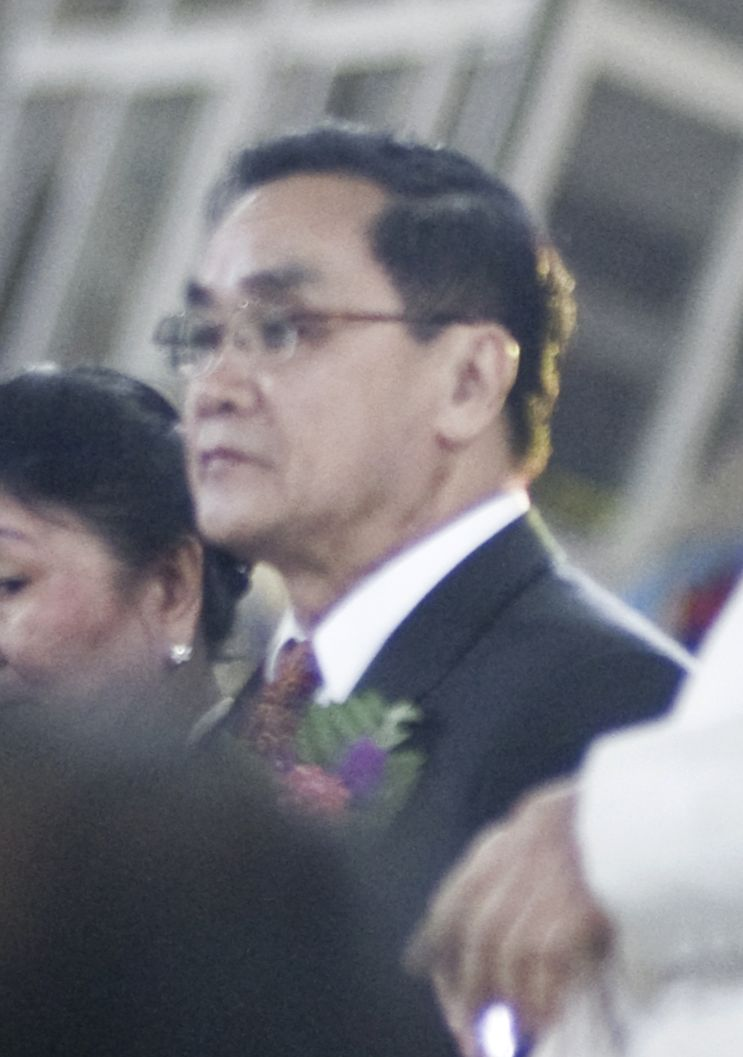
(Laos) Thongsing Thammavong
Prime Minister

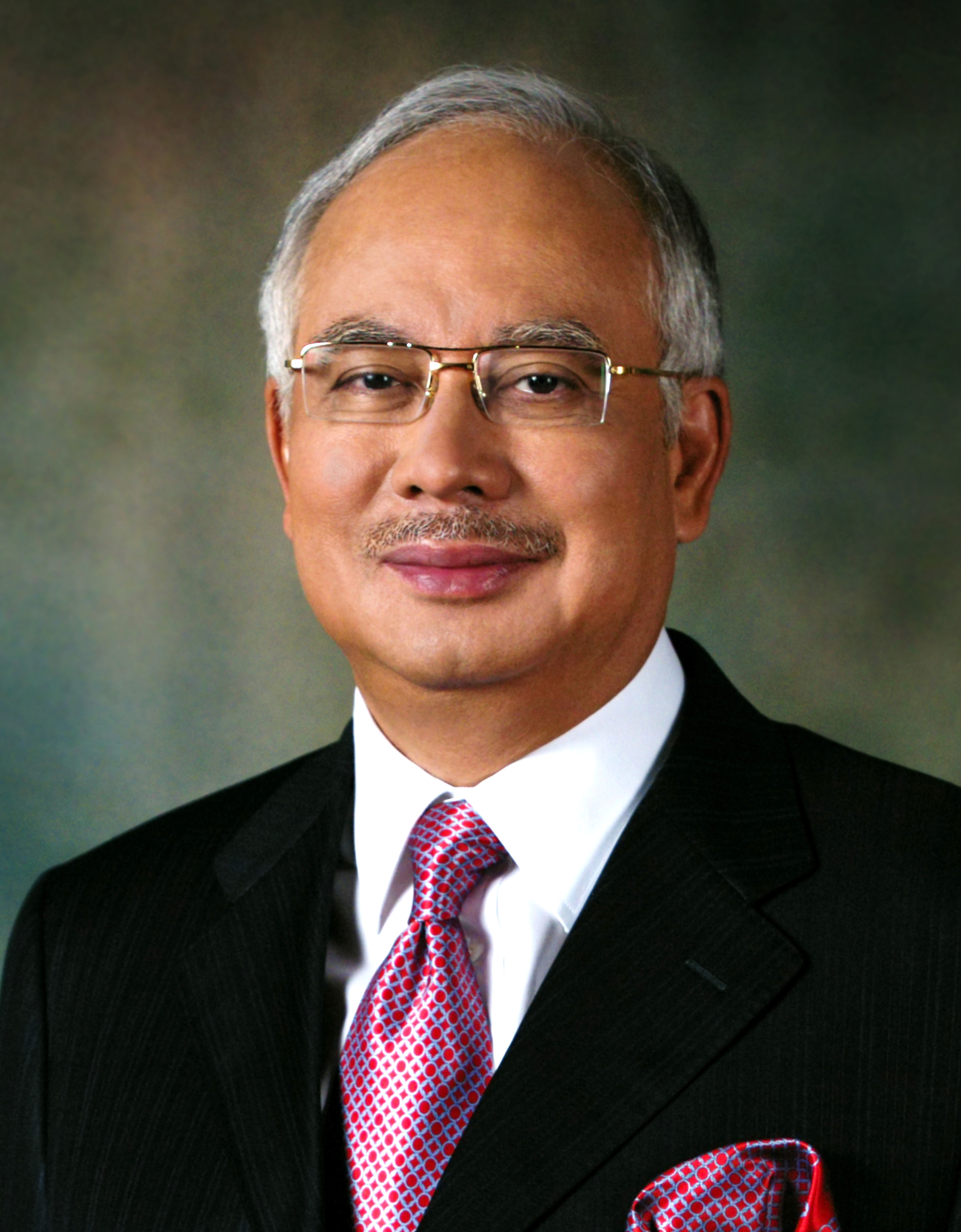
(Malaysia) Najib Tun Razak
Prime Minister

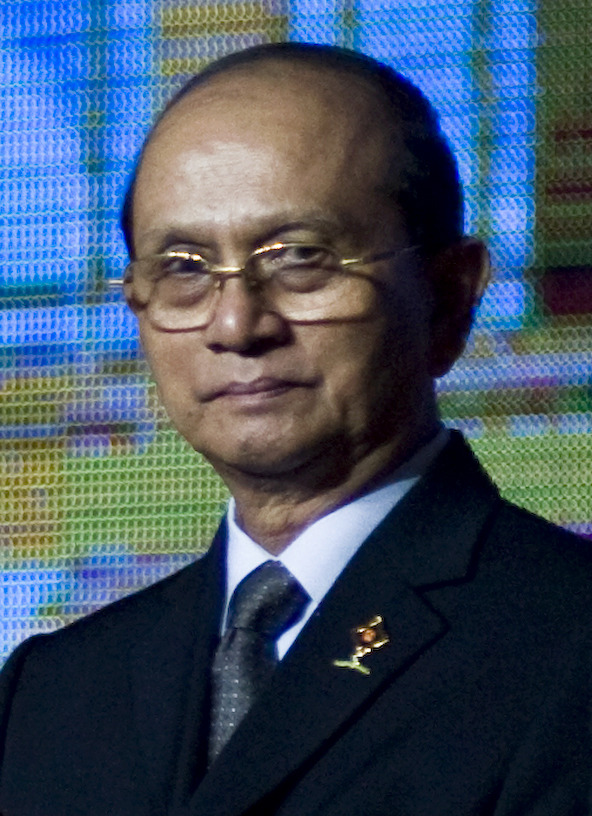
(Myanmar) Thein Sein
President

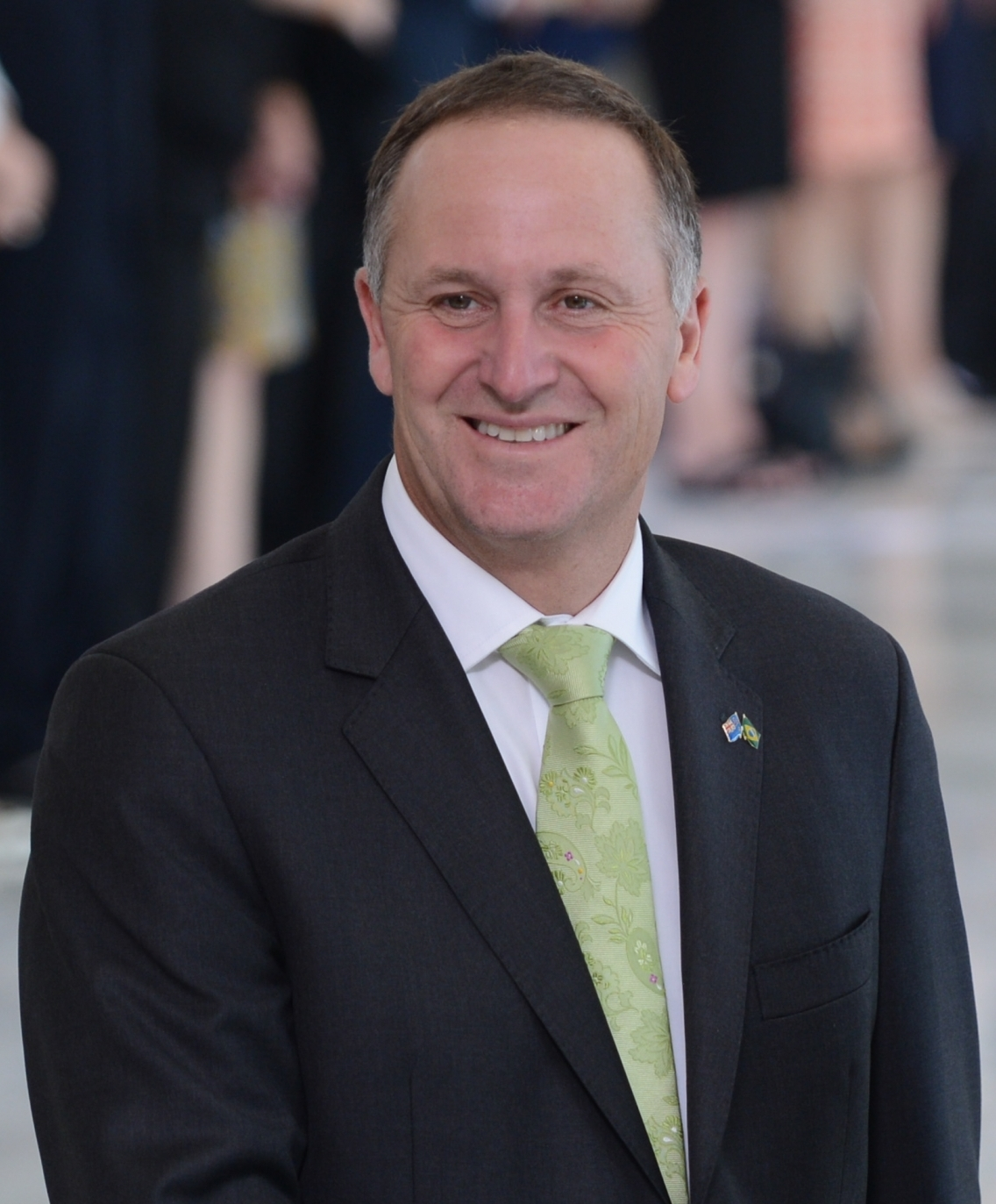
(New Zealand) John Key
Prime Minister

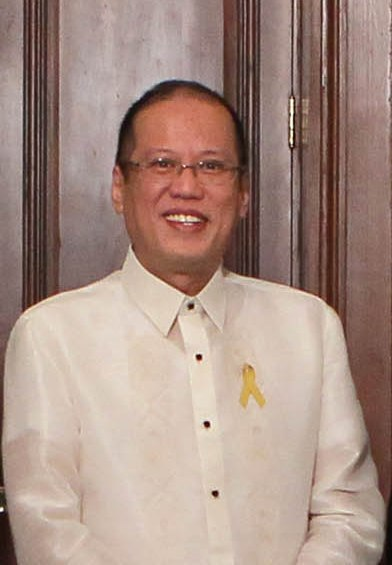
(Philippines) Benigno S. Aquino III
President

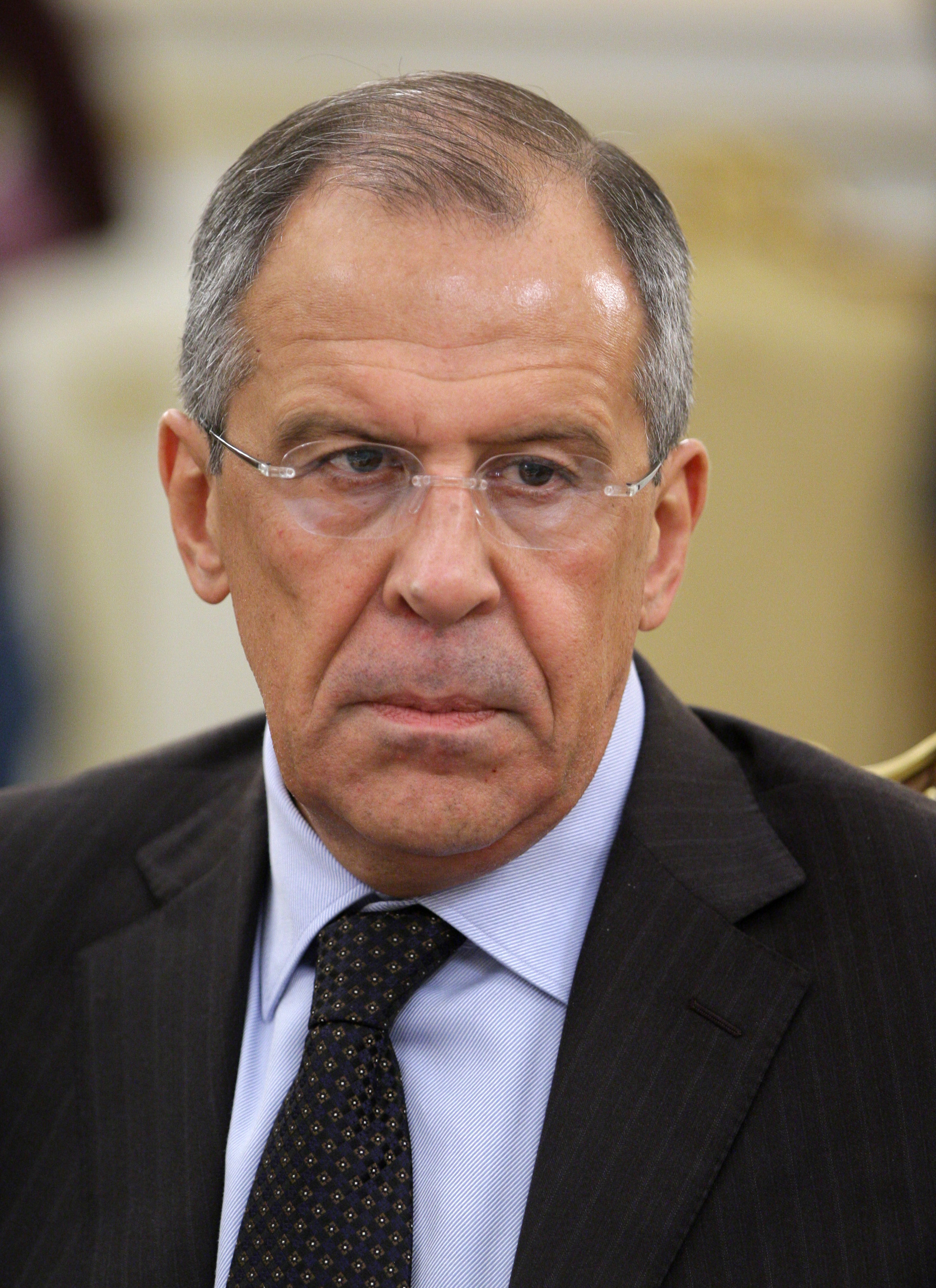
(Russia) Sergey Lavrov
Foreign Minister

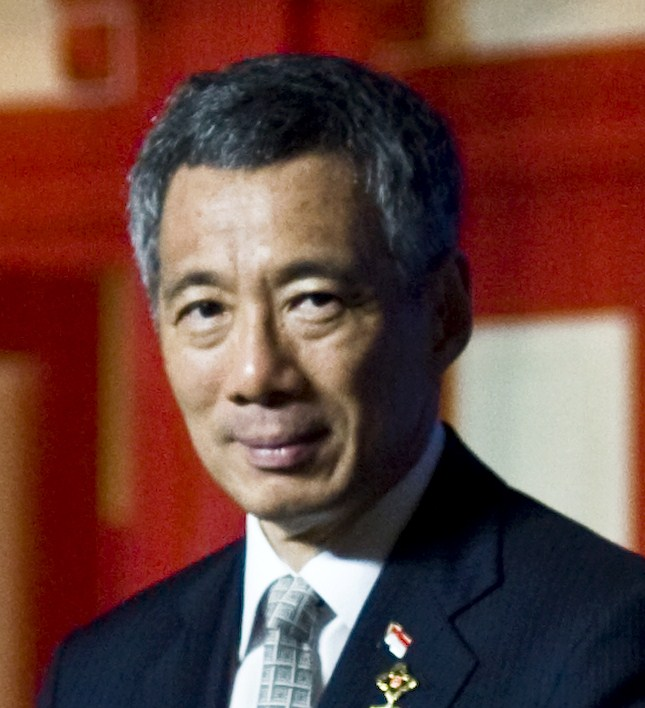
(Singapore) Lee Hsien Loong
Prime Minister

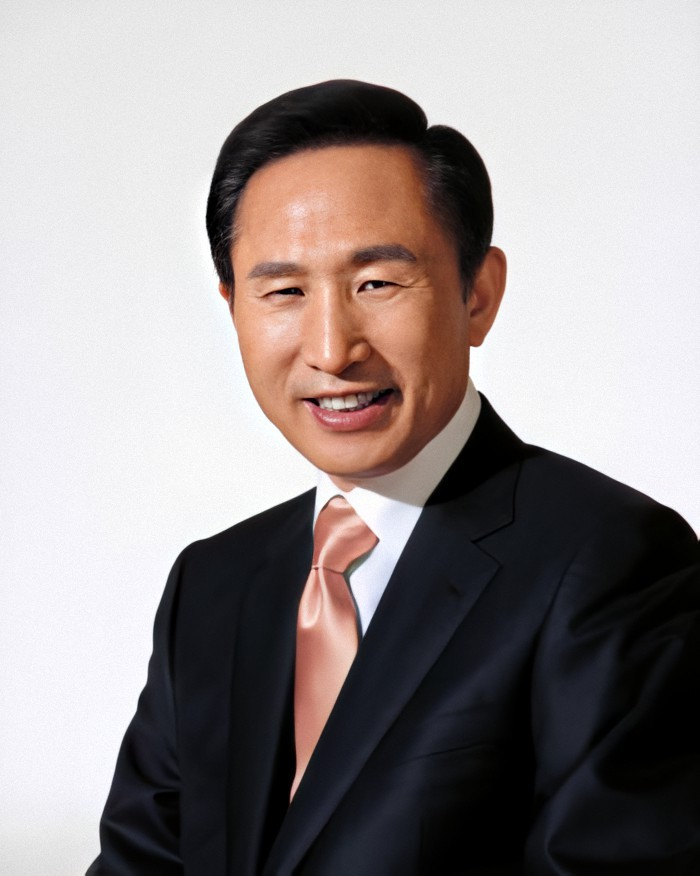
(South Korea) Lee Myung-bak
President

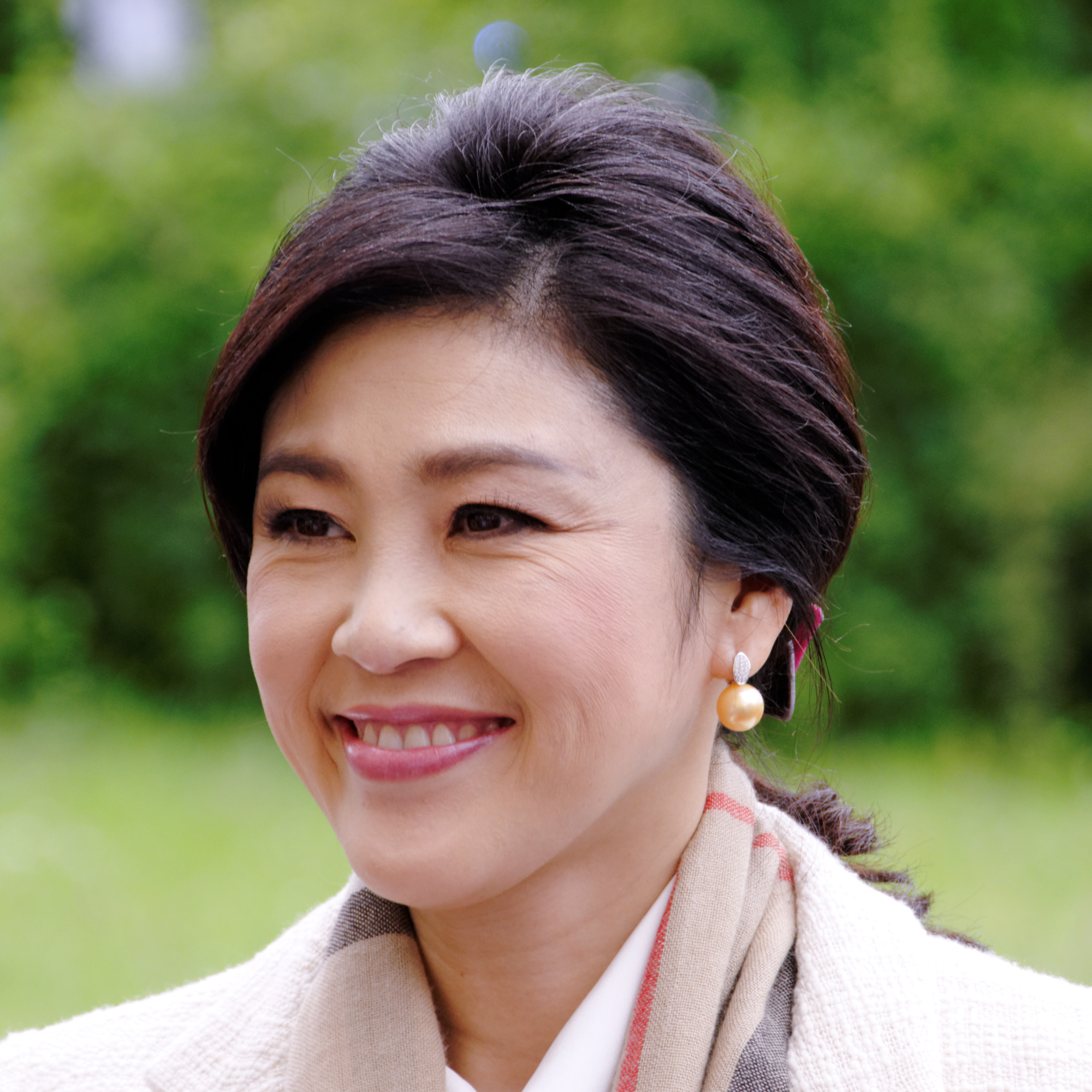
(Thailand) Yingluck Shinawatra
Prime Minister

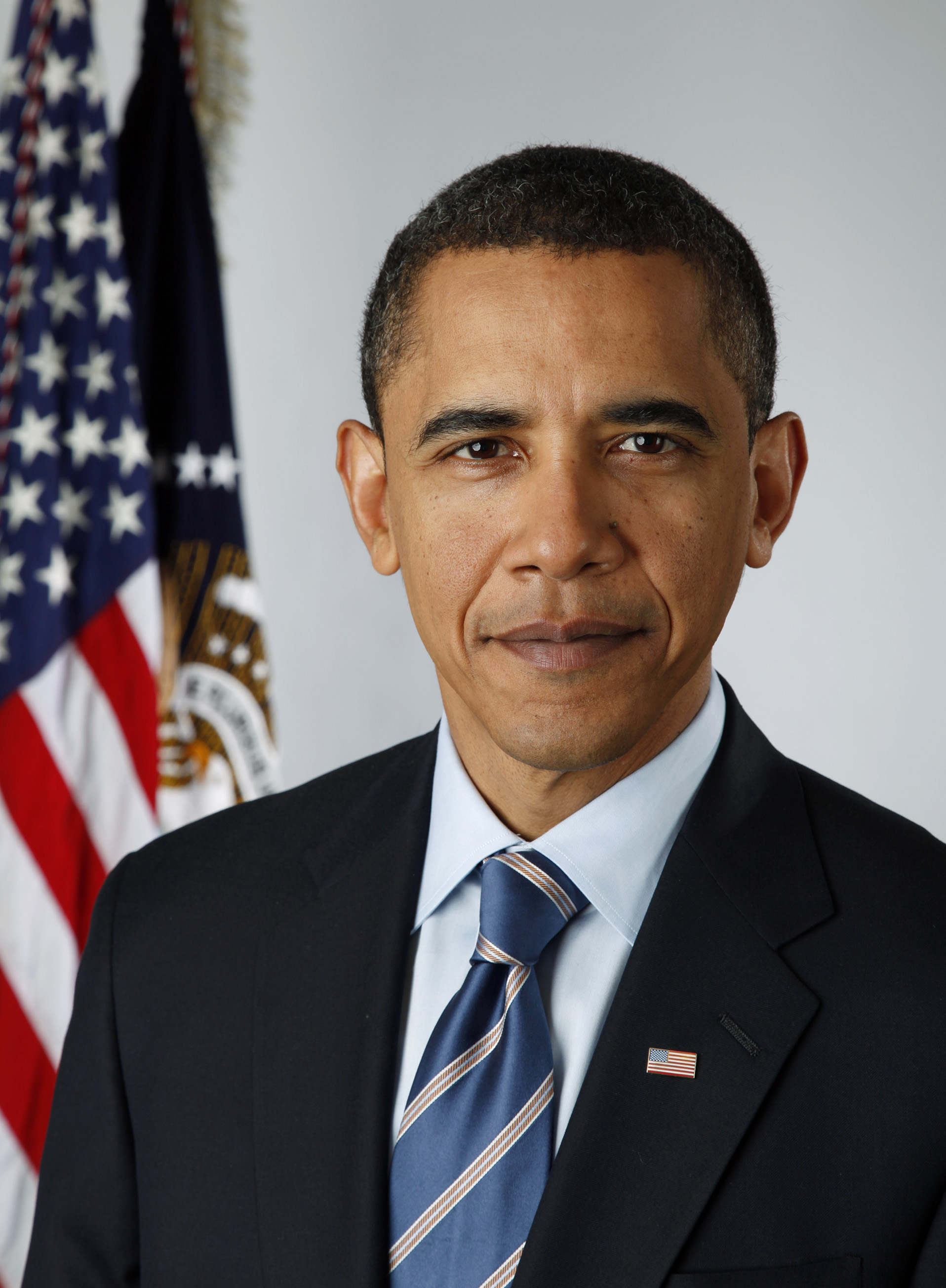
(United States) Barack Obama
President

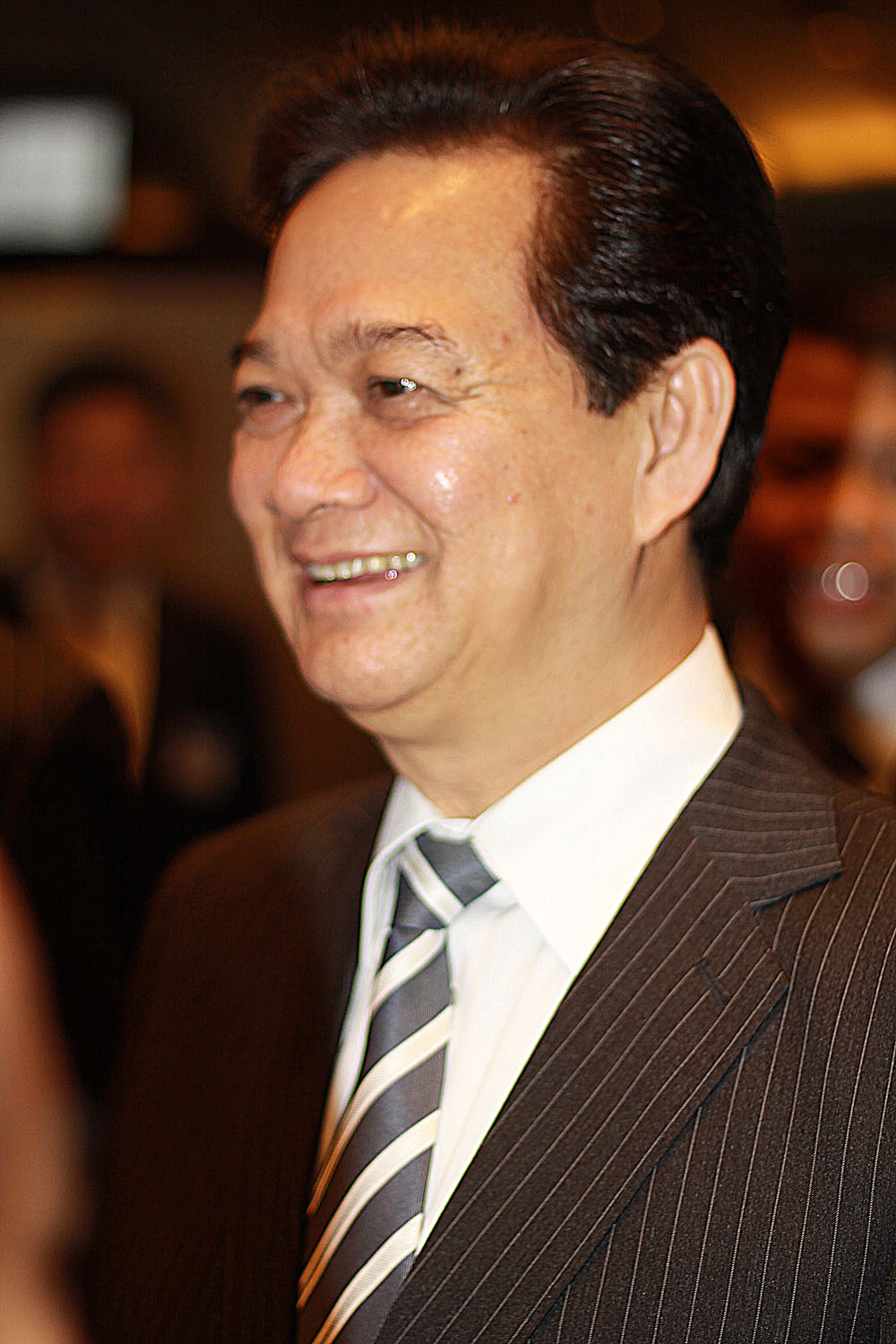
(Vietnam) Nguyễn Tấn Dũng
Prime Minister

== Outcomes ==
The ongoing tensions arising from the territorial disputes in the South China Sea and the disputes in the East China Sea (the Senkaku Islands/Diaoyu Islands) overshadowed the effort to advance the trade and economic arrangements between members of the Summit.

Russian President Vladimir Putin did not attend and was represented by Foreign Minister Sergey Lavrov. The other members' leaders attended.

The Chairman's statement noted progress in the areas of environment and energy, education, finance, global health issues and pandemic diseases, natural disaster mitigation and ASEAN connectivity.
