= List of international prime ministerial trips made by Prayut Chan-o-cha =

This is a list of international prime ministerial trips made by Prayut Chan-o-cha, the Leader of the National Council for Peace and Order from 22 May 2014 to 16 July 2019 and the 29th Prime Minister of Thailand from 24 August 2014 to 22 August 2023. Prayut Chan-o-cha has made sixty-eight international trips to twenty-eight countries during his premiership.

== Summary ==
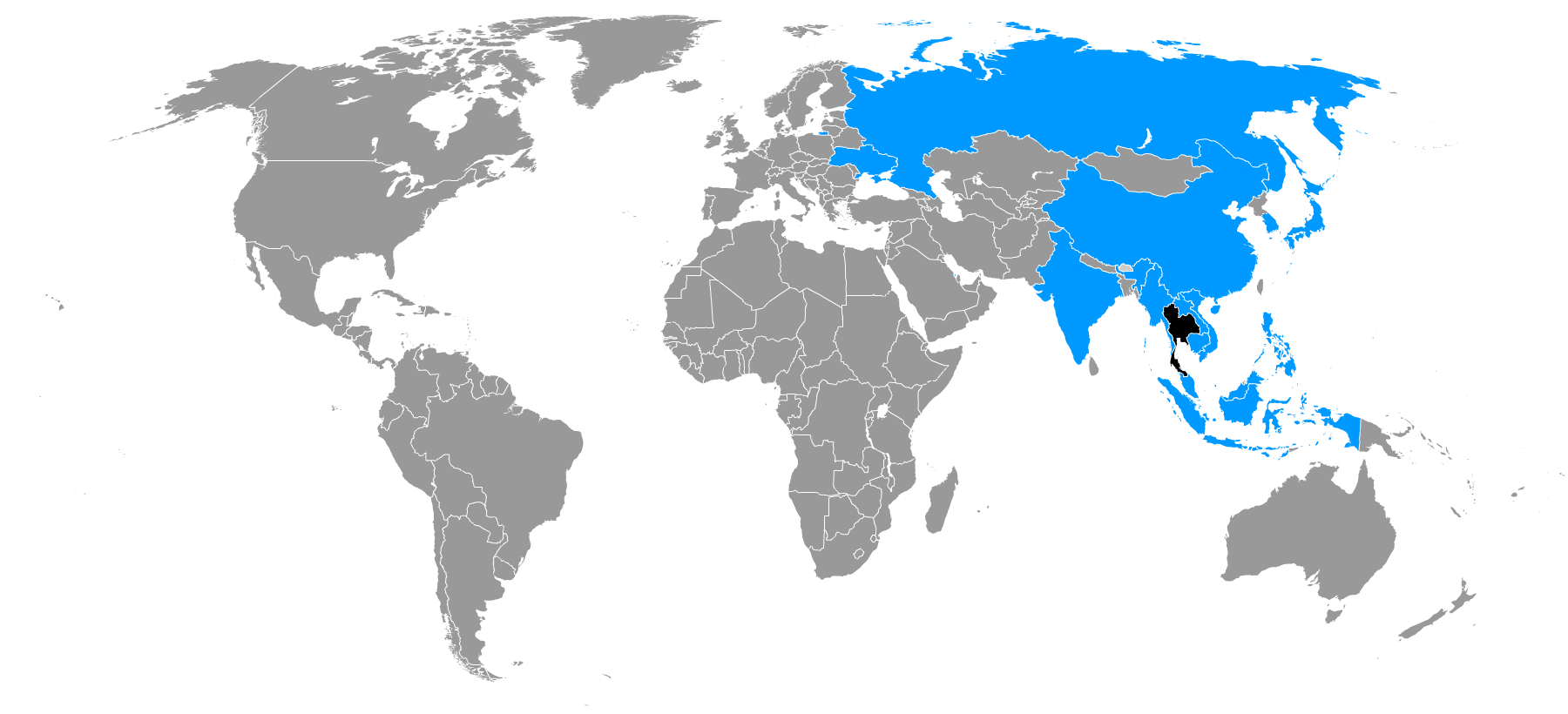
Map of international trips made by Prayut Chan-o-cha as Prime Minister: Thailand Countries visited by Prayut

The number of visits per country where Prime Minister Prayut travelled are:

- One (11): Italy, Russia, Mongolia, Bahrain, Australia, Sri Lanka, Bhutan, Nepal, Papua New Guinea, Germany, and Saudi Arabia
- Two (6): Brunei, India, Indonesia, South Korea, United Kingdom, and Belgium
- Three (3): Myanmar, Vietnam, and France
- Four (3): Malaysia, Philippines, and Laos
- Six (3): Singapore, China, and Cambodia
- Seven (2): United States, and Japan

== 2014 ==
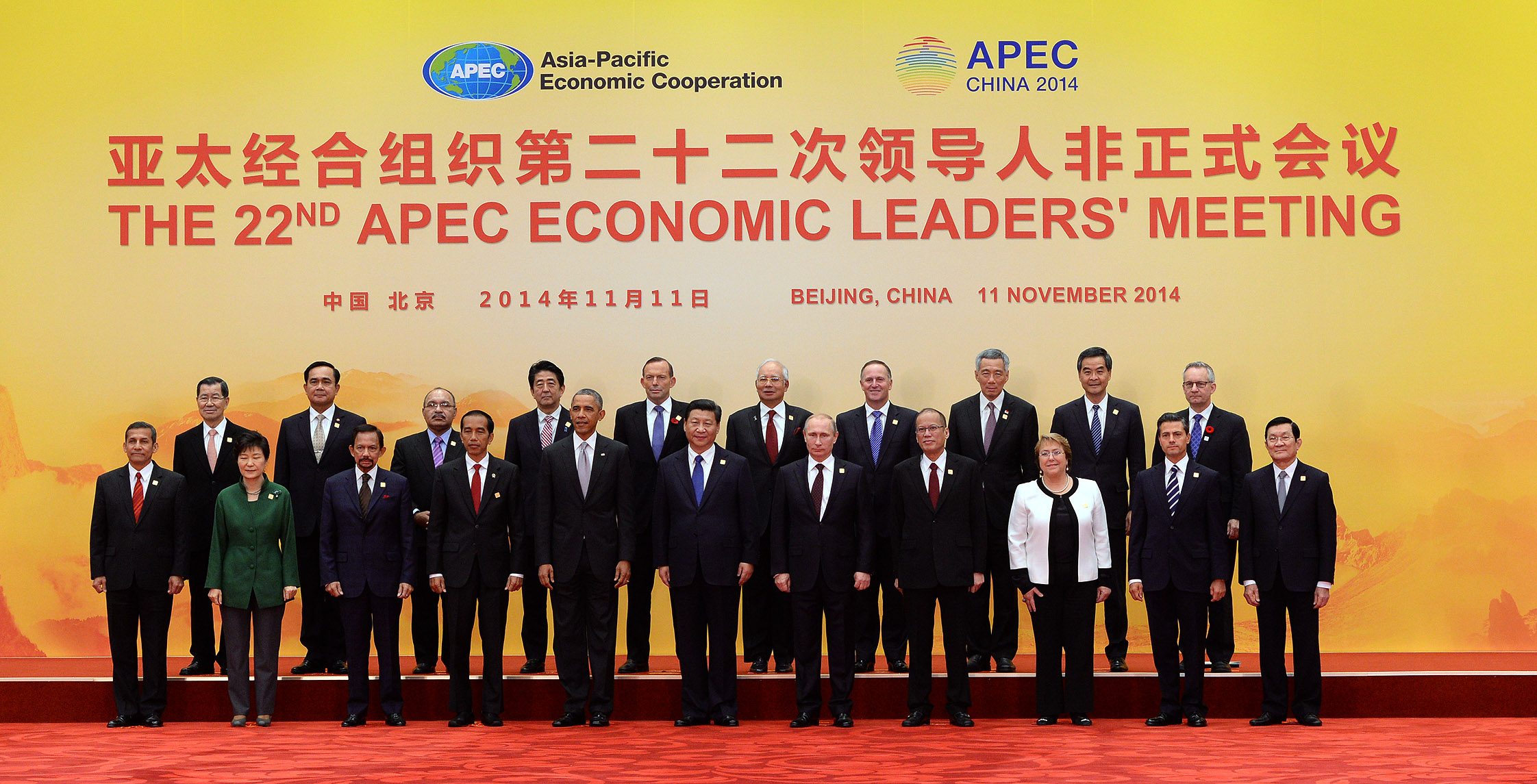
APEC 2014 leaders and guest leaders

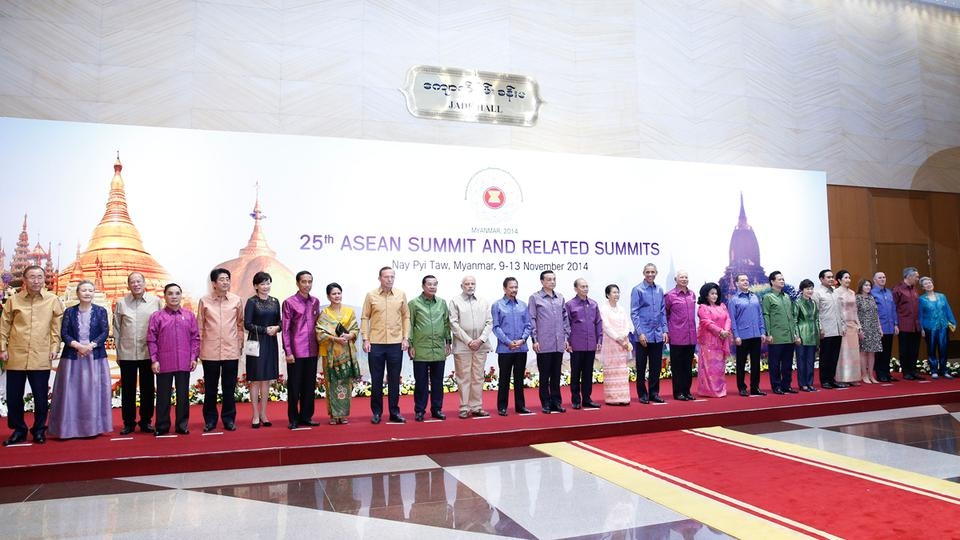
25th ASEAN Summit leaders and guest leaders

#	Country	Location	Date	Details
1	Myanmar	Naypyidaw, Yangon	9–10 October	Official visit. Invited by President Thein Sein. Myanmar is Prayut's first trip to an ASEAN member state where he met with President Thein Sein. Prayut also made a visit to Shwedagon Pagoda.
2	Italy	Milan	15–17 October	Working visit. Prayut attended the ASEM10 where he met with Japanese Prime Minister Shinzo Abe, Chinese Premier Li Keqiang, Cambodian Prime Minister Hun Sen, Singaporean Prime Minister Lee Hsien Loong, Laotian Prime Minister Thongsing Thammavong, Vietnamese Prime Minister Nguyễn Tấn Dũng, and Indian External Affairs Minister V. K. Singh.
3	Cambodia	Phnom Penh	30–31 October	Official visit. Invited by Prime Minister Hun Sen. Cambodia is Prayut's second trip to an ASEAN member state where he met with King Norodom Sihamoni, and Prime Minister Hun Sen.
4	China	Beijing	9–11 November	Working visit. Prayut attended the APEC 2014 where he met with Chinese President Xi Jinping, Chinese Premier Li Keqiang, and Papua New Guinean Prime Minister Peter O'Neill.
4	Myanmar	Naypyidaw	11–13 November	Working visit. Prayut attended the 25th ASEAN Summit and the 9th East Asia Summit where he met with UN Secretary-General Ban Ki-moon, South Korean President Park Geun-hye, Indian Prime Minister Narendra Modi, Russian Prime Minister Dmitry Medvedev, and Japanese Prime Minister Shinzo Abe.
5	Laos	Vientiane	26–27 November	Official visit. Invited by Prime Minister Thongsing Thammavong. Laos is Prayut's third trip to an ASEAN member state where he met with President Choummaly Sayasone, Prime Minister Thongsing Thammavong, and President of the National Assembly Pany Yathotou.
5	Vietnam	Hanoi	27–28 November	Official visit. Invited by Prime Minister Nguyễn Tấn Dũng. Vietnam is Prayut's fourth trip to an ASEAN member state where he met with President Trương Tấn Sang, Prime Minister Nguyễn Tấn Dũng, and Chairman of the National Assembly Nguyễn Sinh Hùng.
6	Malaysia	Kuala Lumpur, Putrajaya	1 December	Official visit. Invited by Prime Minister Najib Razak. Malaysia is Prayut's fifth trip to an ASEAN member state where he met with Prime Minister Najib Razak.
7	South Korea	Busan	10–12 December	Working visit. Prayut attended the ASEAN–ROK Commemorative Summit 2014 where he met with South Korean President Park Geun-hye, and Bruneian Sultan Hassanal Bolkiah.
8	China	Beijing, Tianjin	22–23 December	Official visit. Invited by Premier Li Keqiang. Where he met with President Xi Jinping, Premier Li Keqiang, and Chairman of the Standing Committee of the National People's Congress Zhang Dejiang.

== 2015 ==
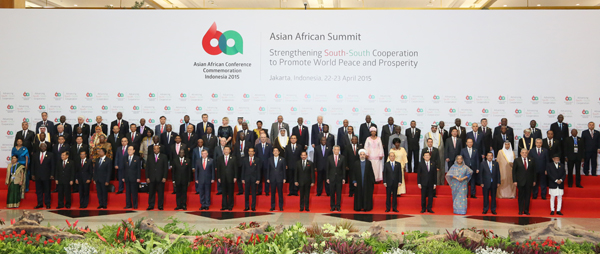
Asian–African Conference 2015 leaders

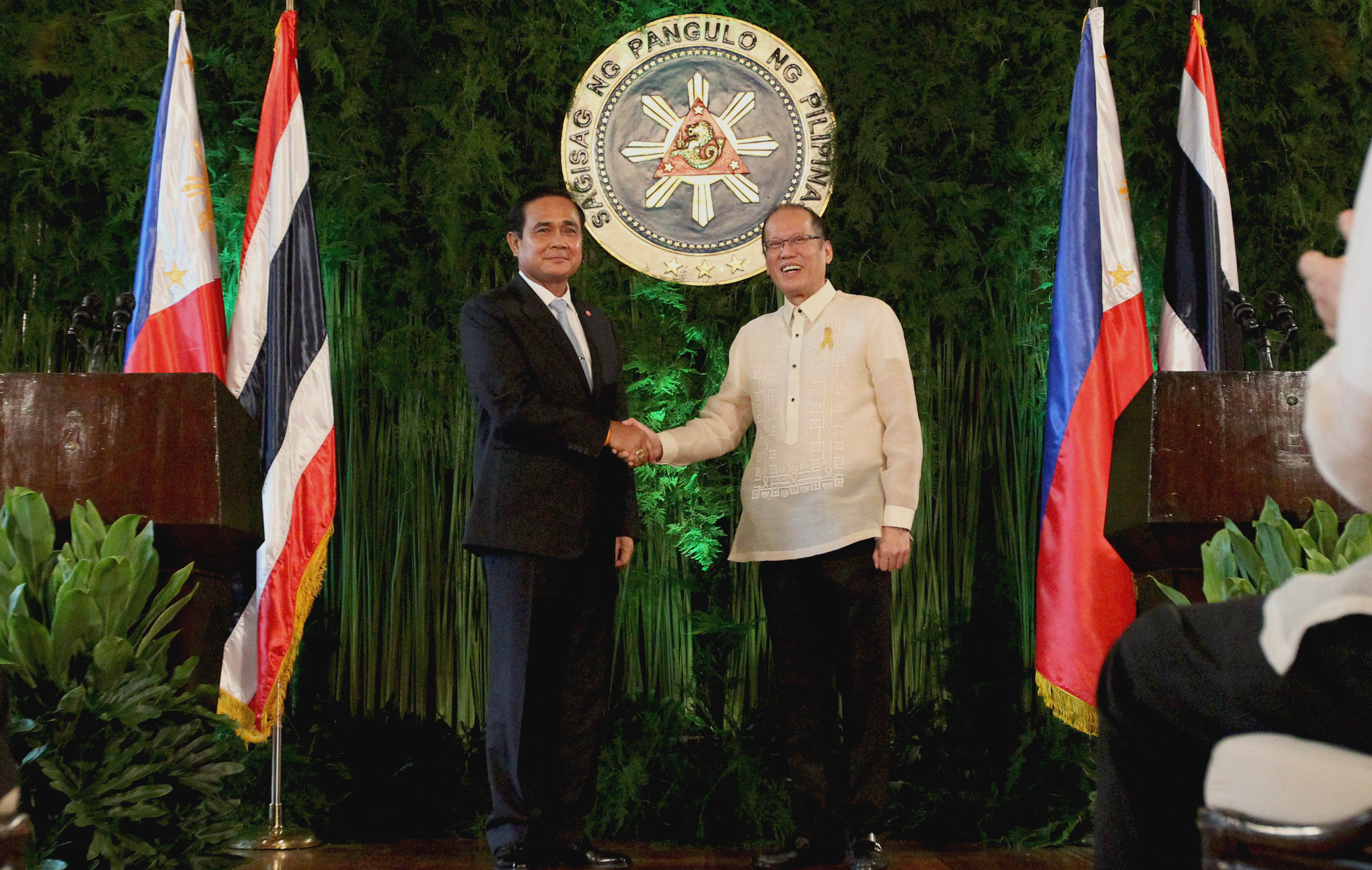
Official visit to the Philippines

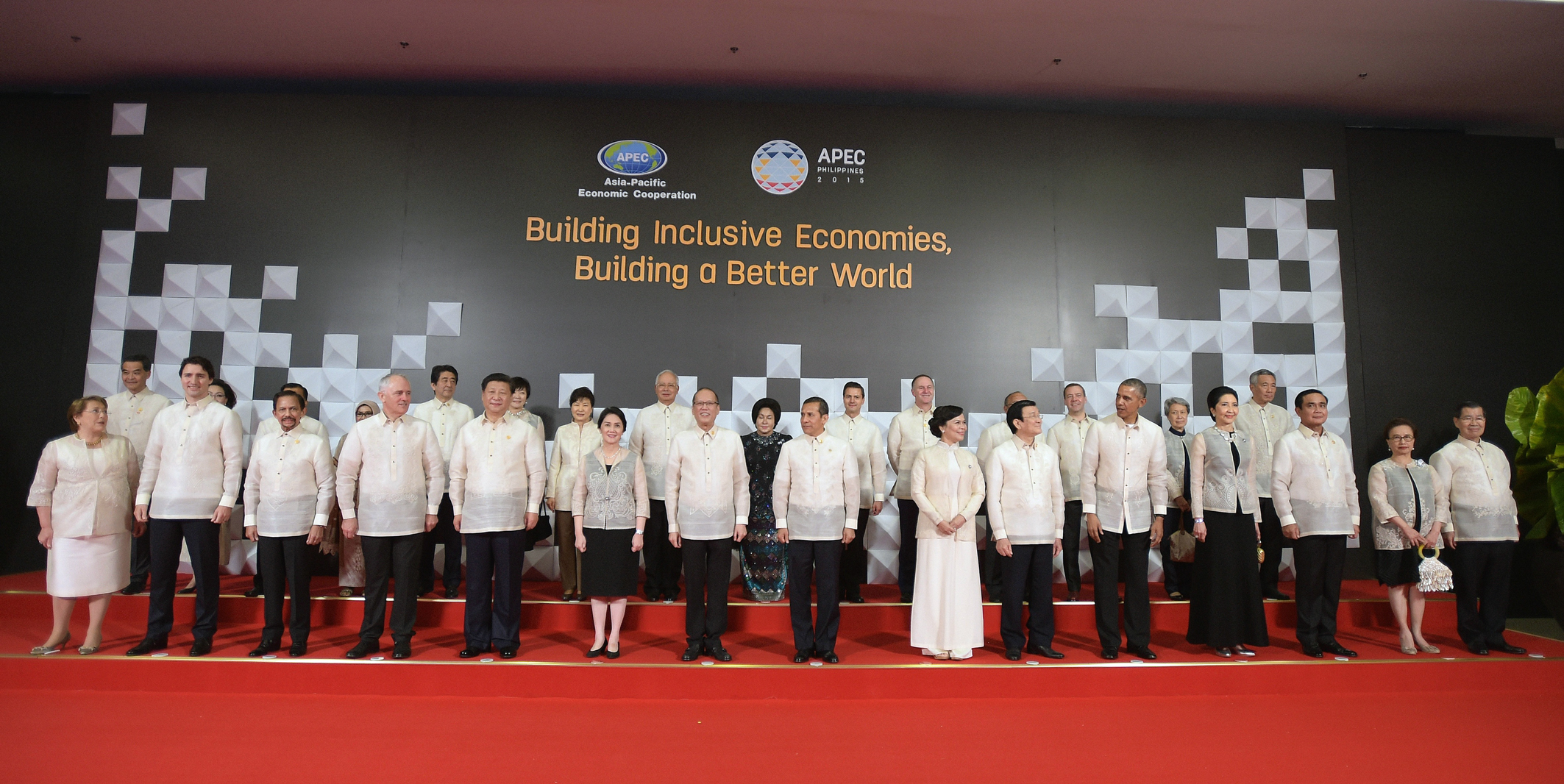
APEC 2015 leaders and guest leaders

#	Country	Location	Date	Details
9	Japan	Tokyo, Osaka	8–10 February	Official working visit. Invited by Prime Minister Shinzo Abe. Where he met with Crown Prince Naruhito, Prime Minister Shinzo Abe, Health, Labour and Welfare Minister Yasuhisa Shiozaki, Chairman of JETRO Hiroyuki Ishige, Chairman of SMBC Teisuke Kitayama, Chairman of Honda Motor Fumihiko Ike, Chairman of Marubeni Fumiya Kobuki, Chairman of Mitsubishi Motors Osamu Masuko, and CEO of Mitsui Masami Iijima.
10	Japan	Tokyo, Sendai	13–14 March	Working visit. Prayut attended the 3WCDRR where he met with Japanese Prime Minister Shinzo Abe.
11	Brunei	Bandar Seri Begawan	25–26 March	Official visit. Invited by Sultan Hassanal Bolkiah. Brunei is Prayut's sixth trip to an ASEAN member state where he met with Sultan Hassanal Bolkiah, and Crown Prince Al-Muhtadee Billah.
12	Singapore	Singapore	29 March	Guest visit. Prayut attended the State funeral of Lee Kuan Yew.
13	Indonesia	Jakarta	21–23 April	Working visit. Prayut attended the Asian-African Conference 2015 where he met with Jordanian King Abdullah II, Indonesian President Joko Widodo, Palestinian Prime Minister Rami Hamdallah, and Tunisian Foreign Affairs Minister Taïeb Baccouche.
14	Malaysia	Kuala Lumpur, Langkawi	26–28 April	Working visit. Prayut attended the 26th ASEAN Summit where he met with Malaysian Prime Minister Najib Razak, Vietnamese Prime Minister Nguyễn Tấn Dũng, and Hongkonger Chief Executive Leung Chun-ying.
15	Singapore	Singapore	11–12 June	Official visit. Invited by Prime Minister Lee Hsien Loong. Singapore is Prayut's seventh trip to an ASEAN member state where he met with President Tony Tan, Prime Minister Lee Hsien Loong, and Environment and Water Resources Minister Vivian Balakrishnan. And also met with the Thai athletes at the 2015 SEA Games.
16	Myanmar	Naypyidaw	22–23 June	Working visit. Prayut attended the ACMECS Summit 2015.
17	Japan	Tokyo	2–4 July	Working visit. Prayut attended the 7th Mekong–Japan Summit where he met with Japanese Emperor Akihito, Japanese Prime Minister Shinzo Abe, Chairman of JETRO Hiroyuki Ishige, and President of Mitsui Tasuo Yasunaga.
18	Singapore	Singapore	9 August	Guest visit. Prayut attended the 50th National Day Parade. Where he met with President Tony Tan.
19	Philippines	Manila	27–28 August	Official visit. Invited by President Benigno Aquino III. Philippines is Prayut's eighth trip to an ASEAN member state where he met with President Benigno Aquino III.
20	United States	New York City	24–29 September	Working visit. Prayut attended the 70th UNGA where he met with UN Secretary-General Ban Ki-moon, UNODC Executive Director Yuri Fedotov, Czech President Miloš Zeman, Equatoguinean Second vice president Teodoro Nguema Obiang Mangue, and Fijian Prime Minister Frank Bainimarama.
21	Philippines	Manila, Pasay	17–19 November	Working visit. Prayut attended the APEC 2015 where he met with Papua New Guinean Prime Minister Peter O'Neill, Russian Prime Minister Dmitry Medvedev, and Hongkonger Chief Executive Leung Chun-ying.
21	Malaysia	Kuala Lumpur	19–22 November	Working visit. Prayut attended the 27th ASEAN Summit and the 10th East Asia Summit where he met with Japanese Prime Minister Shinzo Abe.
22	France	Paris	29–30 November	Working visit. Prayut attended the COP 21.

== 2016 ==
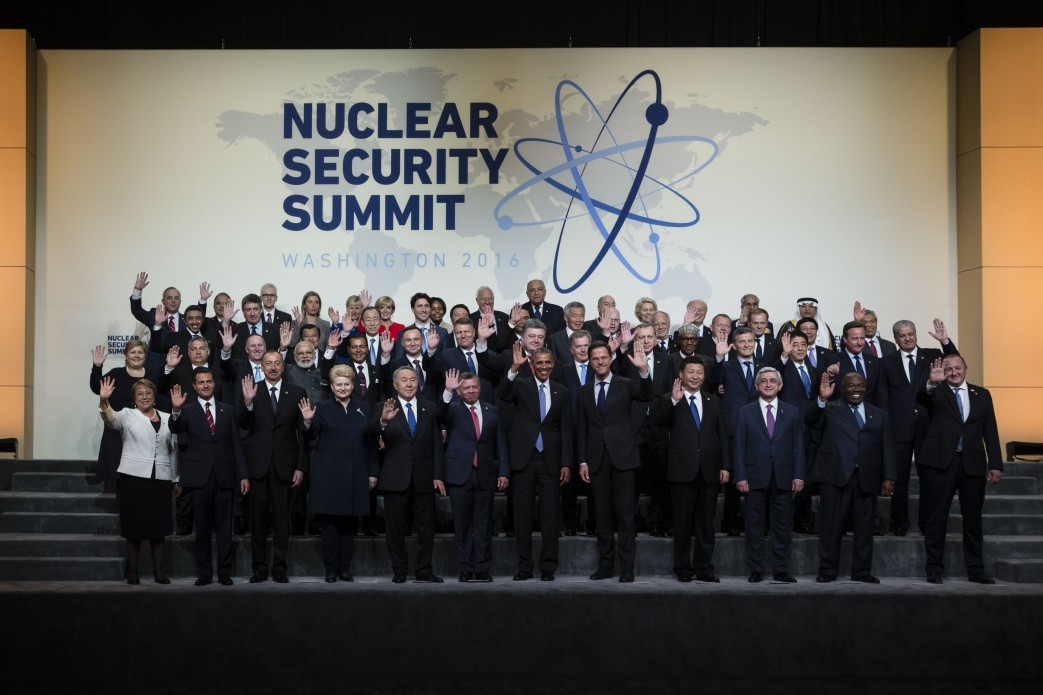
2016 Nuclear Security Summit leaders

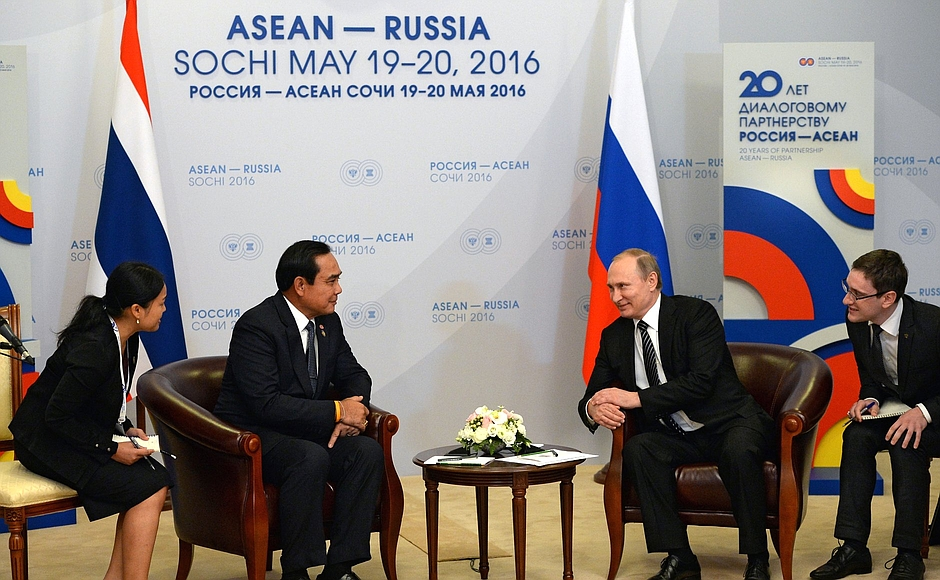
Prayut Chan-o-cha and Vladimir Putin at the ASEAN–Russia Commemorative Summit

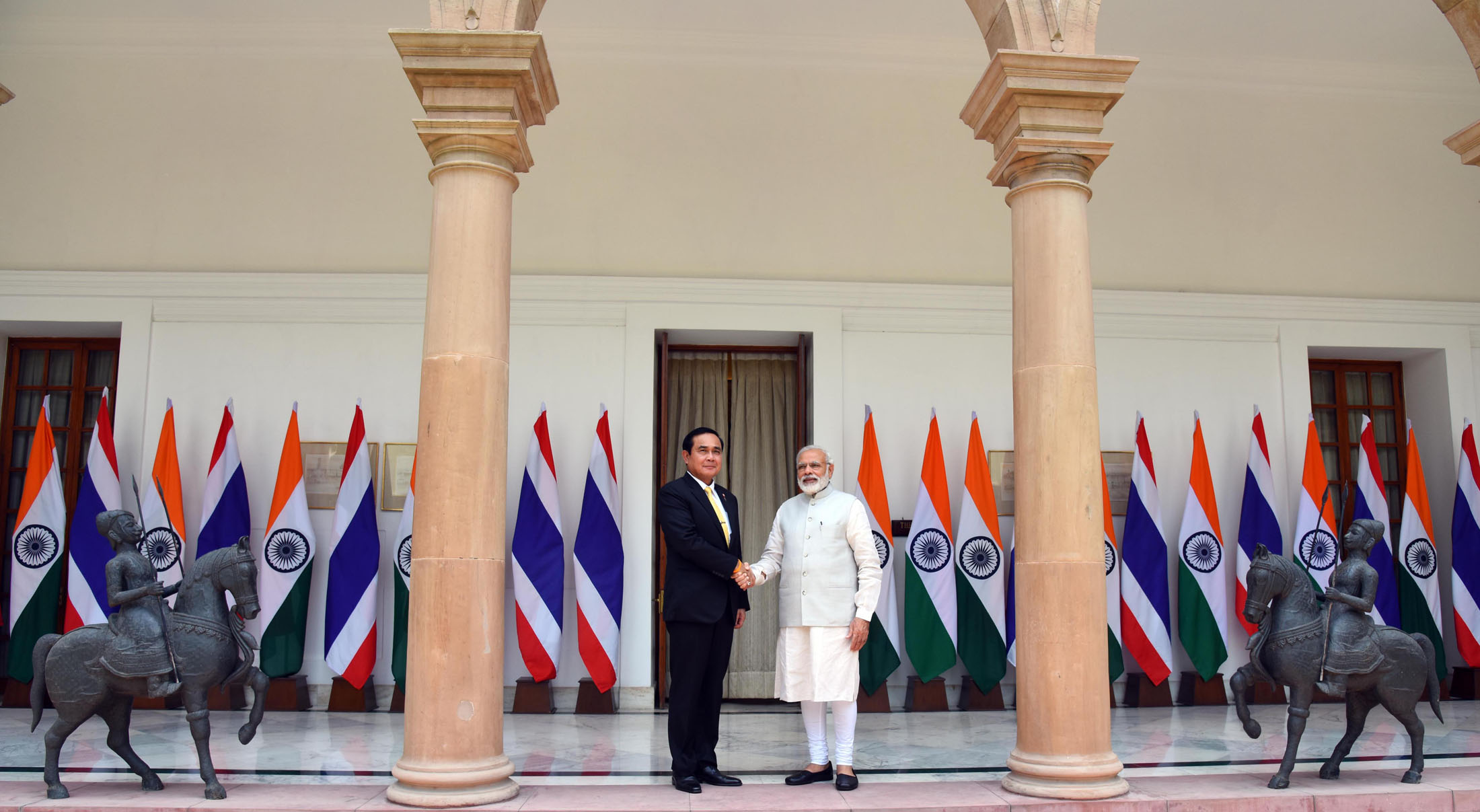
Official visit to India

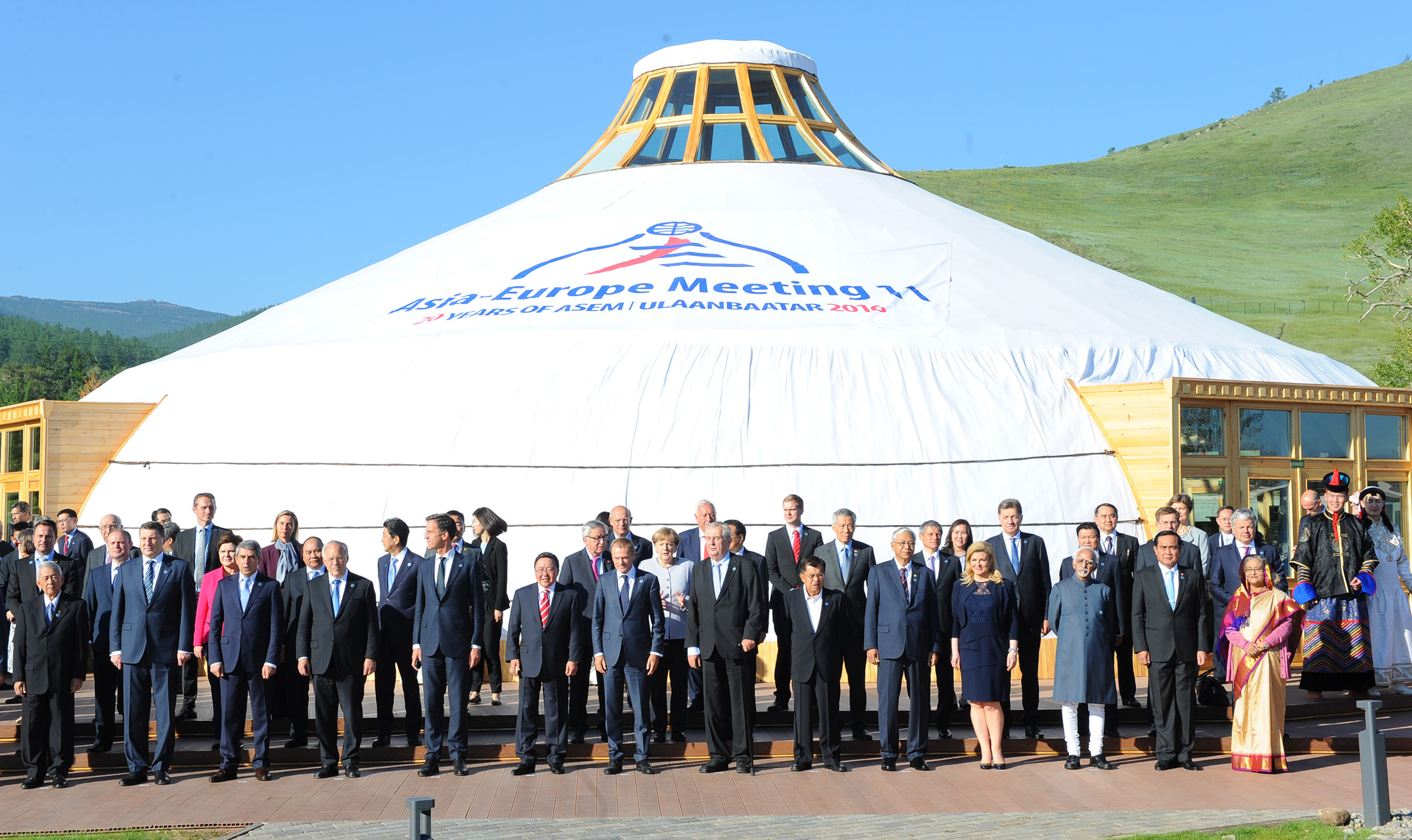
ASEM11 Summit leaders

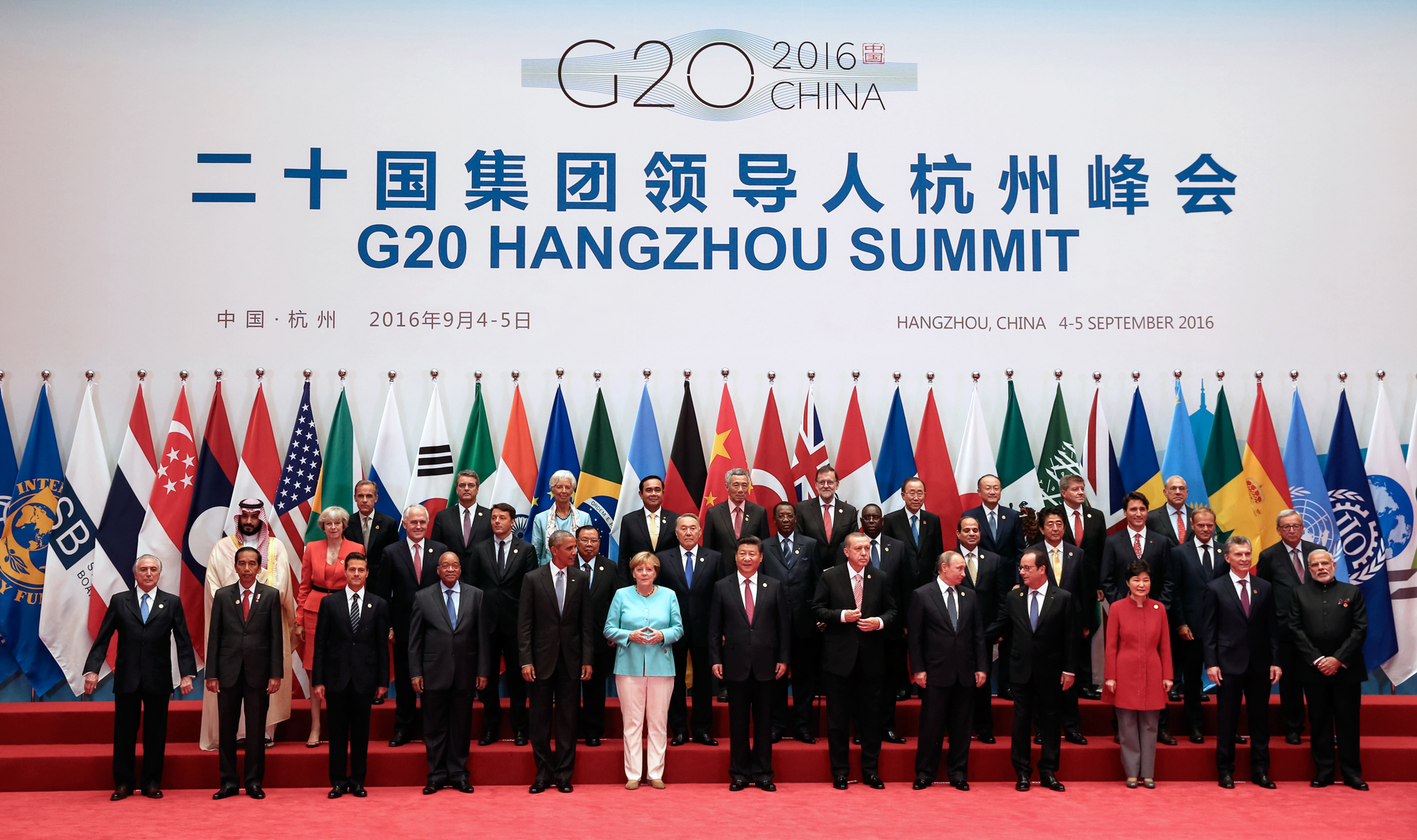
G20 2016 leaders and guest leaders

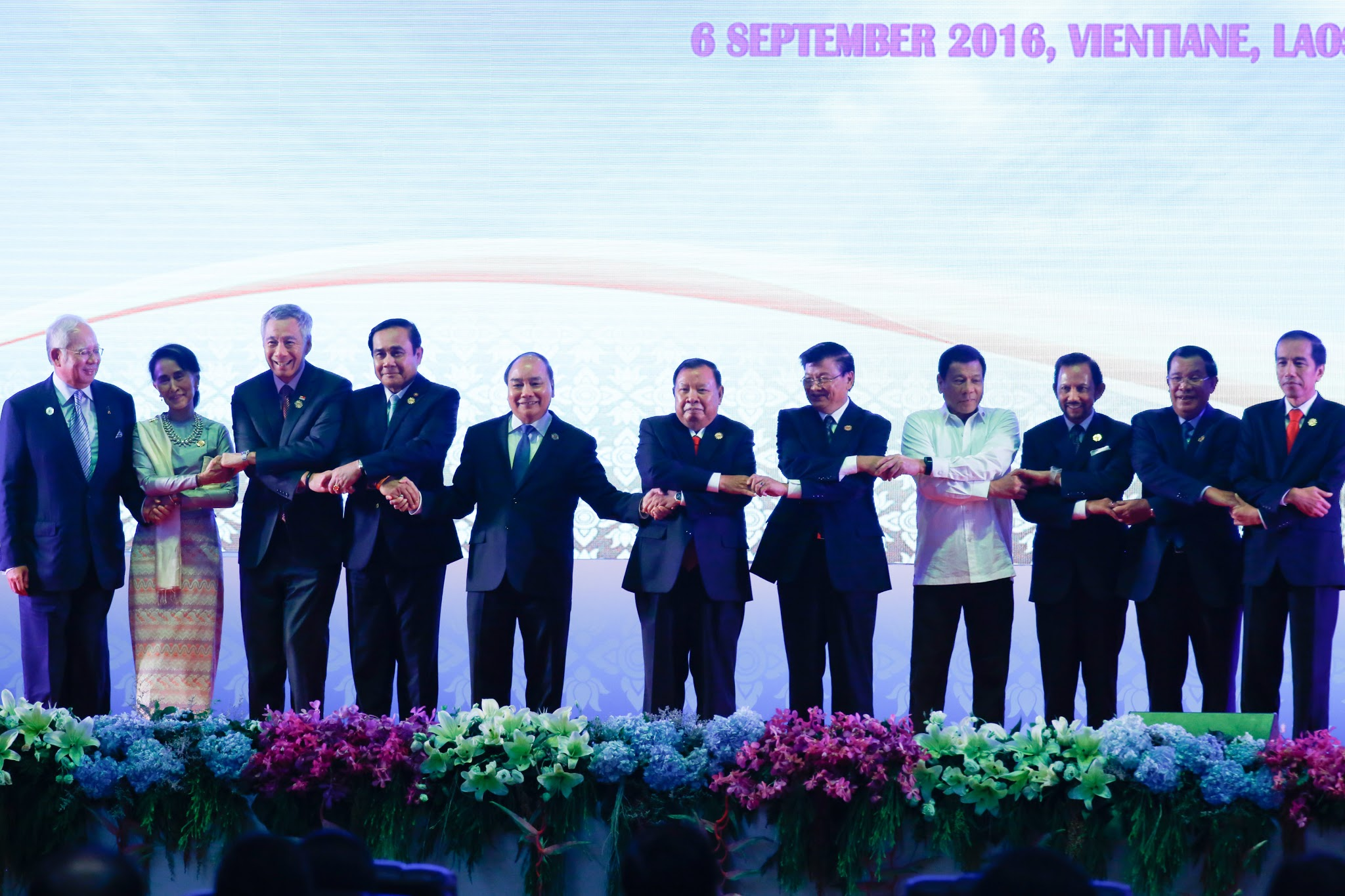
ASEAN Summit 2016 leaders

#	Country	Location	Date	Details
23	United States	Rancho Mirage	14–17 February	Working visit. Prayut attended the ASEAN–US Commemorative Summit 2016 where he met with Vietnamese Prime Minister Nguyễn Tấn Dũng.
24	China	Sanya, Bo'ao	22–24 March	Working visit. Prayut attended the 1st MLC Summit and Boao Forum for Asia 2016 where he met with Chinese Premier Li Keqiang.
25	United States	Washington, D.C.	29 March – 1 April	Working visit. Prayut attended the 2016 Nuclear Security Summit.
26	Russia	Saint Petersburg, Sochi	17–21 May	Official working visit. Prayut attended the ASEAN–Russia Commemorative Summit 2016 where he met with Russian President Vladimir Putin, Burmese President Htin Kyaw, and Russian Prime Minister Dmitry Medvedev.
27	Singapore	Singapore	3 June	Official working visit. Prayut attended the 15th Shangri-La Dialogue where he met with Singaporean Prime Minister Lee Hsien Loong.
28	India	New Delhi, Gaya	16–18 June	Official visit. Invited by Prime Minister Narendra Modi. Where he met with Vice President Mohammad Hamid Ansari, Prime Minister Narendra Modi, and External Affairs Minister Sushma Swaraj. Prayut also made a visit to Mahabodhi Temple.
29	Mongolia	Ulaanbaatar	14–16 July	Working visit. Prayut attended the ASEM11 where he met with Mongolian President Tsakhiagiin Elbegdorj.
30	Malaysia	Kuala Lumpur, Putrajaya	16 August	Working visit. Prayut attended the 1st International Conference on Blue Ocean Strategy.
31	China	Hangzhou	4–5 September	Working visit. Prayut attended the 2016 G20 Hangzhou summit as chair of the G77. Where he met with CEO of Alibaba Group Jack Ma.
31	Laos	Vientiane	5–8 September	Official working visit. Prayut attended the 28th and 29th ASEAN Summit and the 11th East Asia Summit where he met with Laotian Prime Minister Thongloun Sisoulith.
32	United States	New York City	18–25 September	Working visit. Prayut attended the 70th UNGA and the G77 Ministerial Meeting where he met with UN Secretary-General Ban Ki-moon, and Jordanian King Abdullah II.

== 2017 ==
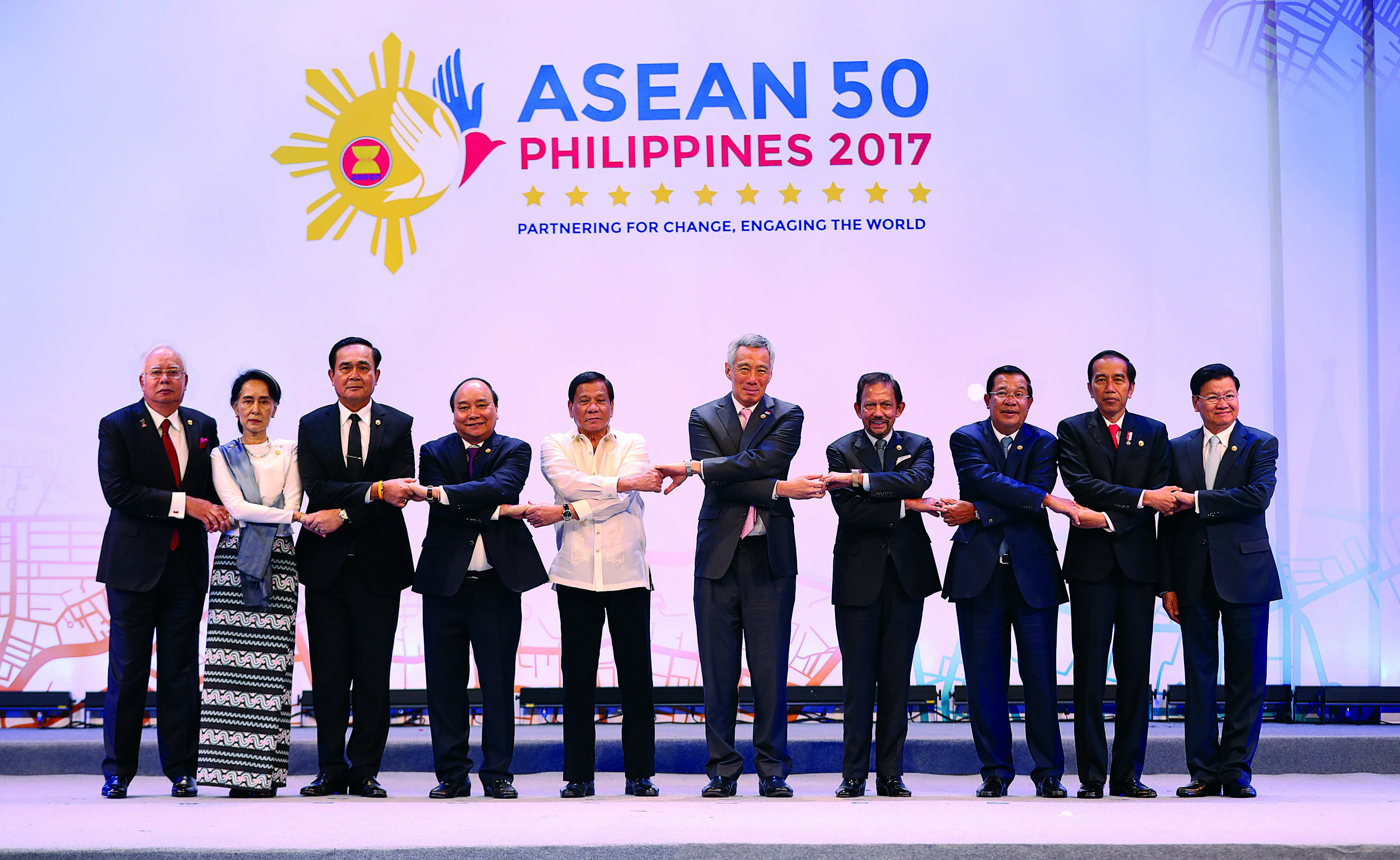
30th ASEAN Summit leaders

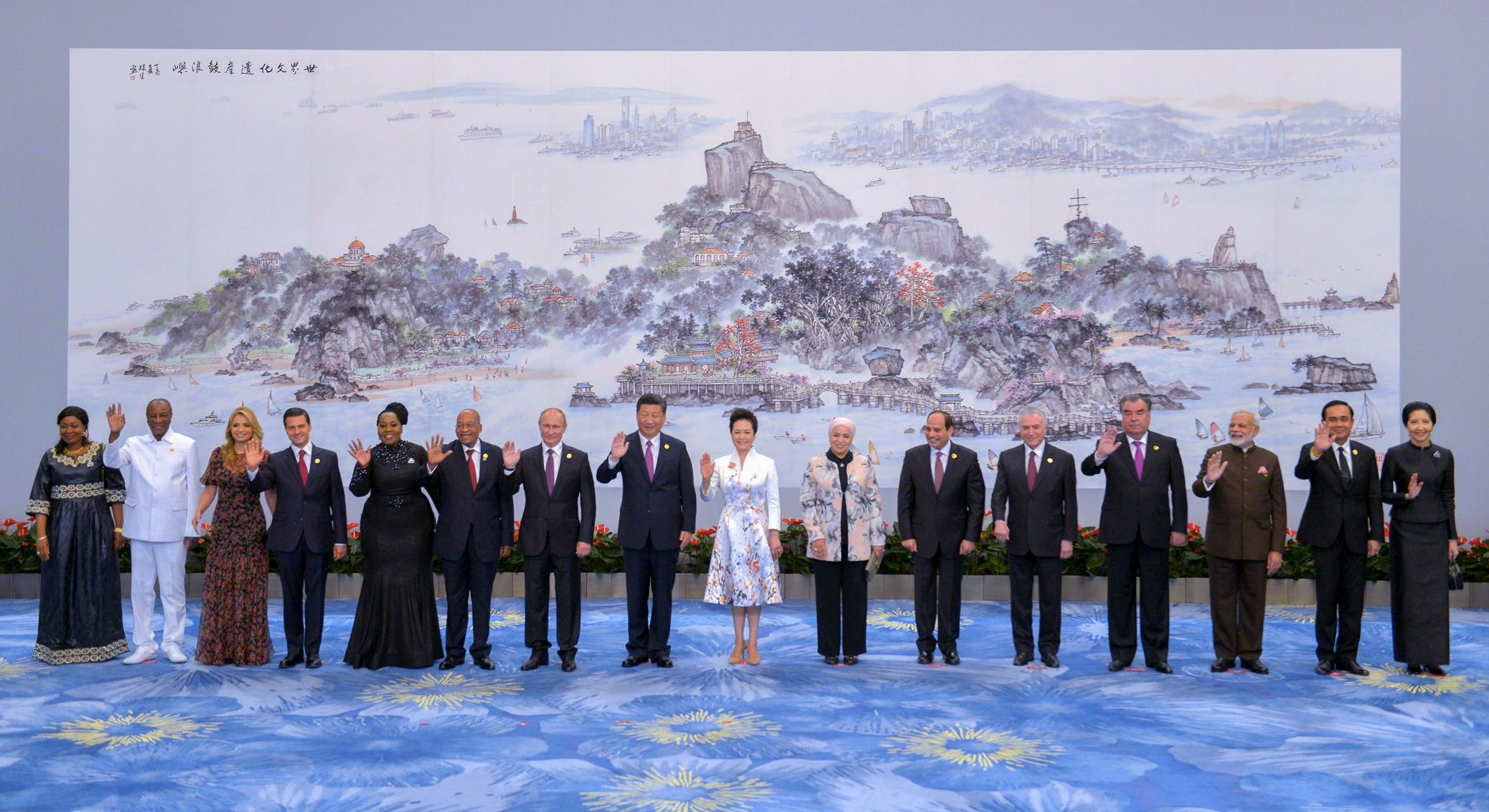
BRICS leaders and guest leaders

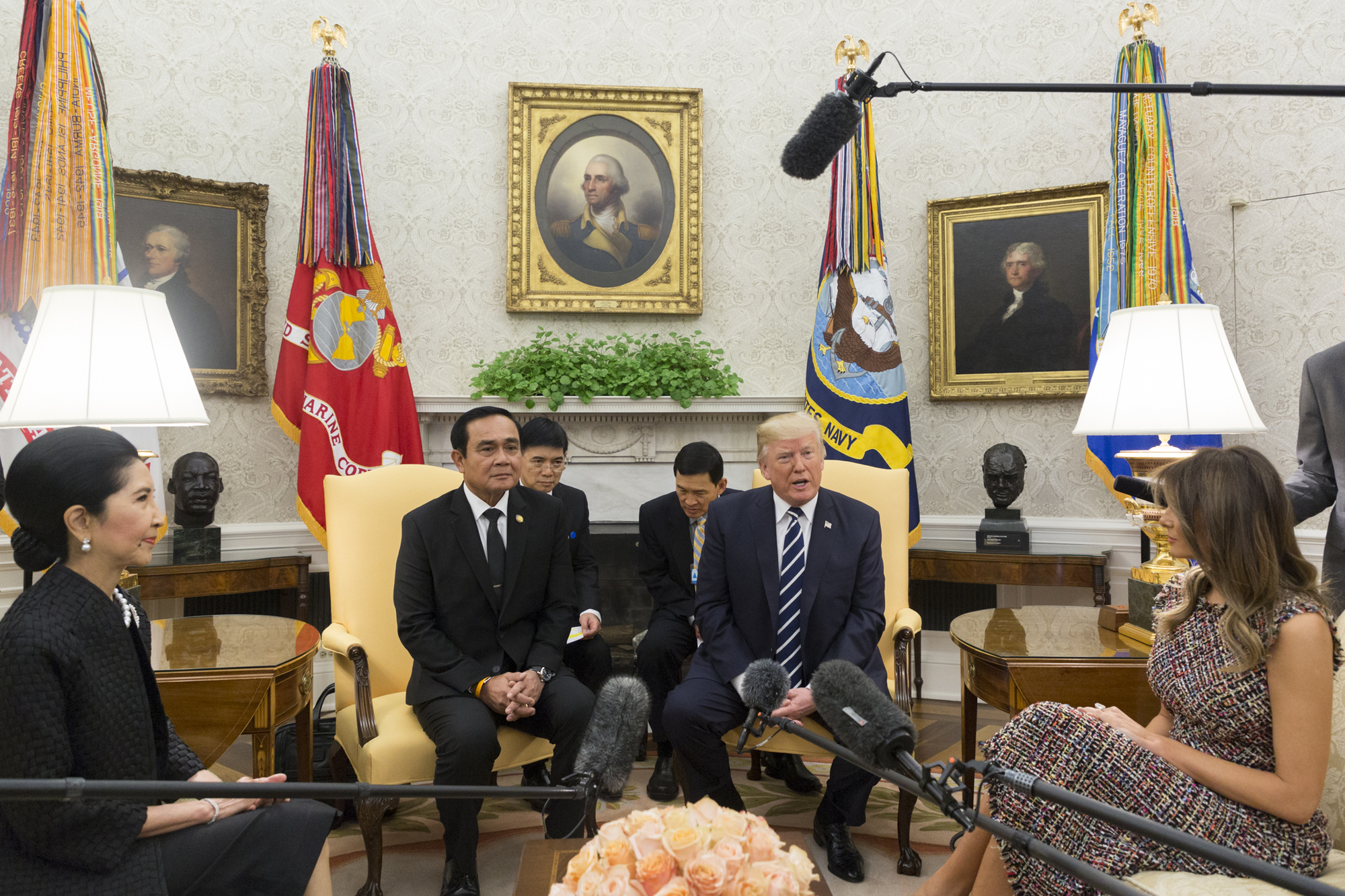
Prayut visit to the United States

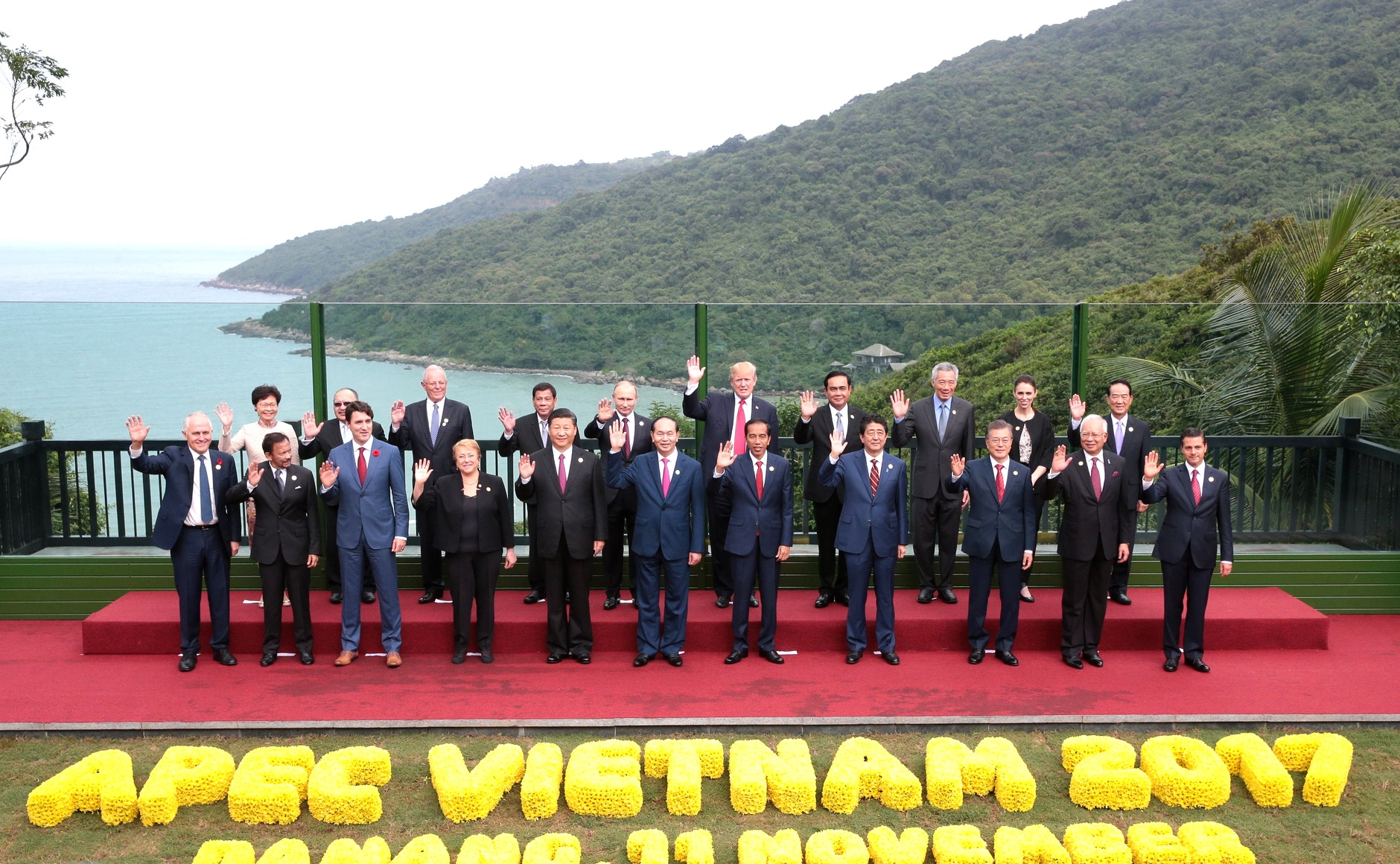
APEC 2017 leaders

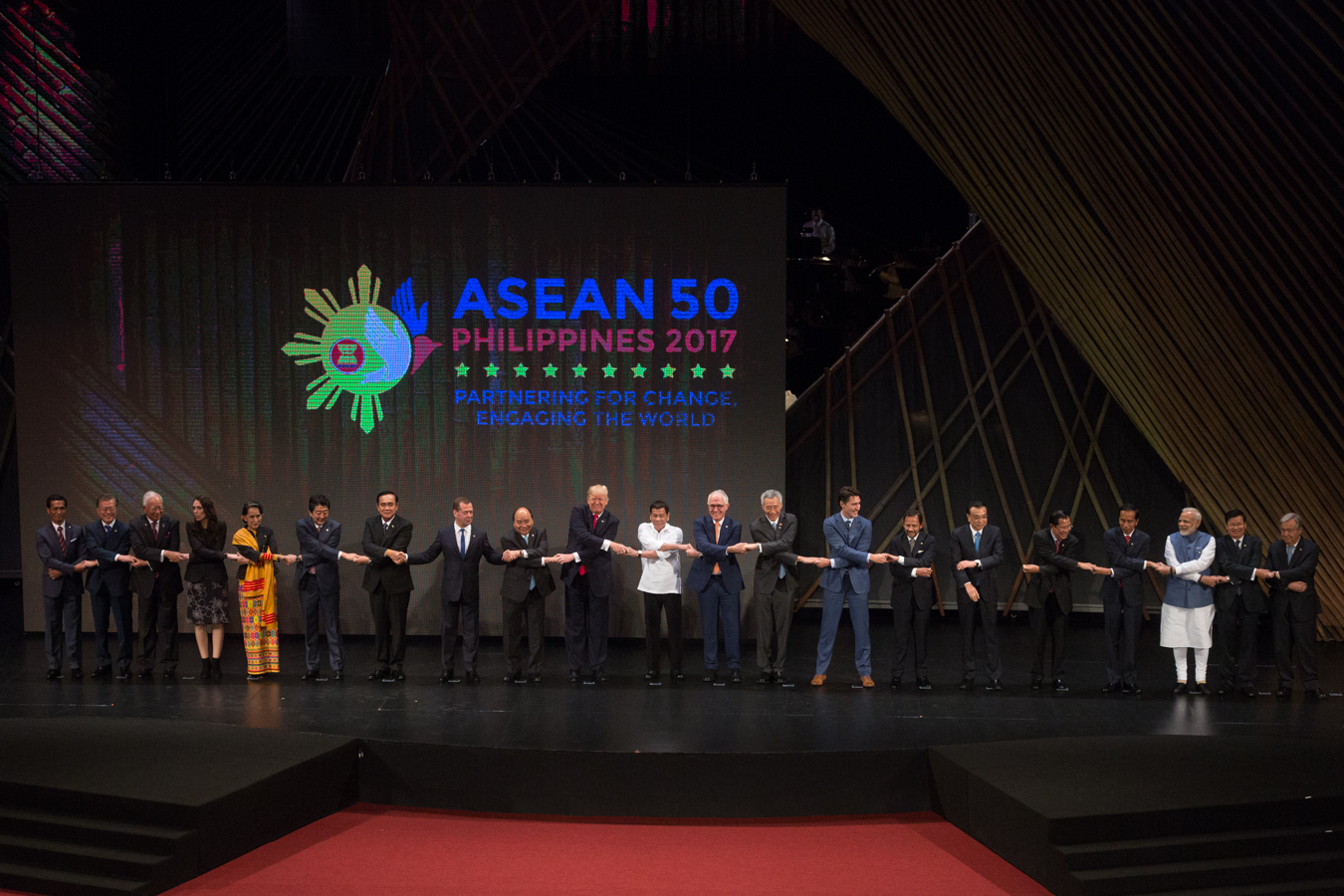
31st ASEAN Summit leaders and guest leaders

#	Country	Location	Date	Details
33	Bahrain	Manama	24–26 April	Official visit. Invited by Prime Minister Khalifa bin Salman Al Khalifa. Where he met with King Hamad bin Isa Al Khalifa, and Prime Minister Khalifa bin Salman Al Khalifa.
34	Philippines	Manila, Pasay	28–30 April	Working visit. Prayut attended the 30th ASEAN Summits.
35	China	Xiamen	4–5 September	Working visit. Prayut attended the 9th BRICS summit as guest invitees. Where he met with Chinese President Xi Jinping, Tajikistani President Emomali Rahmon, and Russian President Vladimir Putin.
36	Cambodia	Phnom Penh	7 September	Official working visit. Invited by Prime Minister Hun Sen. Prayut attended the Thailand–Cambodia Joint Cabinet Retreat where he met with Prime Minister Hun Sen, and President of the Senate Say Chhum.
37	United States	Washington, D.C.	1–4 October	Working visit. Invited by President Donald Trump. Where he met with President Donald Trump.
38	Brunei	Bandar Seri Begawan	6 October	Guest visit. Prayut attended the Golden Jubilee of Hassanal Bolkiah.
39	Vietnam	Da Nang	10–12 November	Working visit. Prayut attended the APEC 2017 where he met with Vietnamese Prime Minister Nguyễn Xuân Phúc, and Hongkonger Chief Executive Carrie Lam.
39	Philippines	Clark, Manila, Pasay	12–15 November	Working visit. Prayut attended the 31st ASEAN Summits and the 12th East Asia Summit.

== 2018 ==
ASEAN–India Commemorative Summit leaders

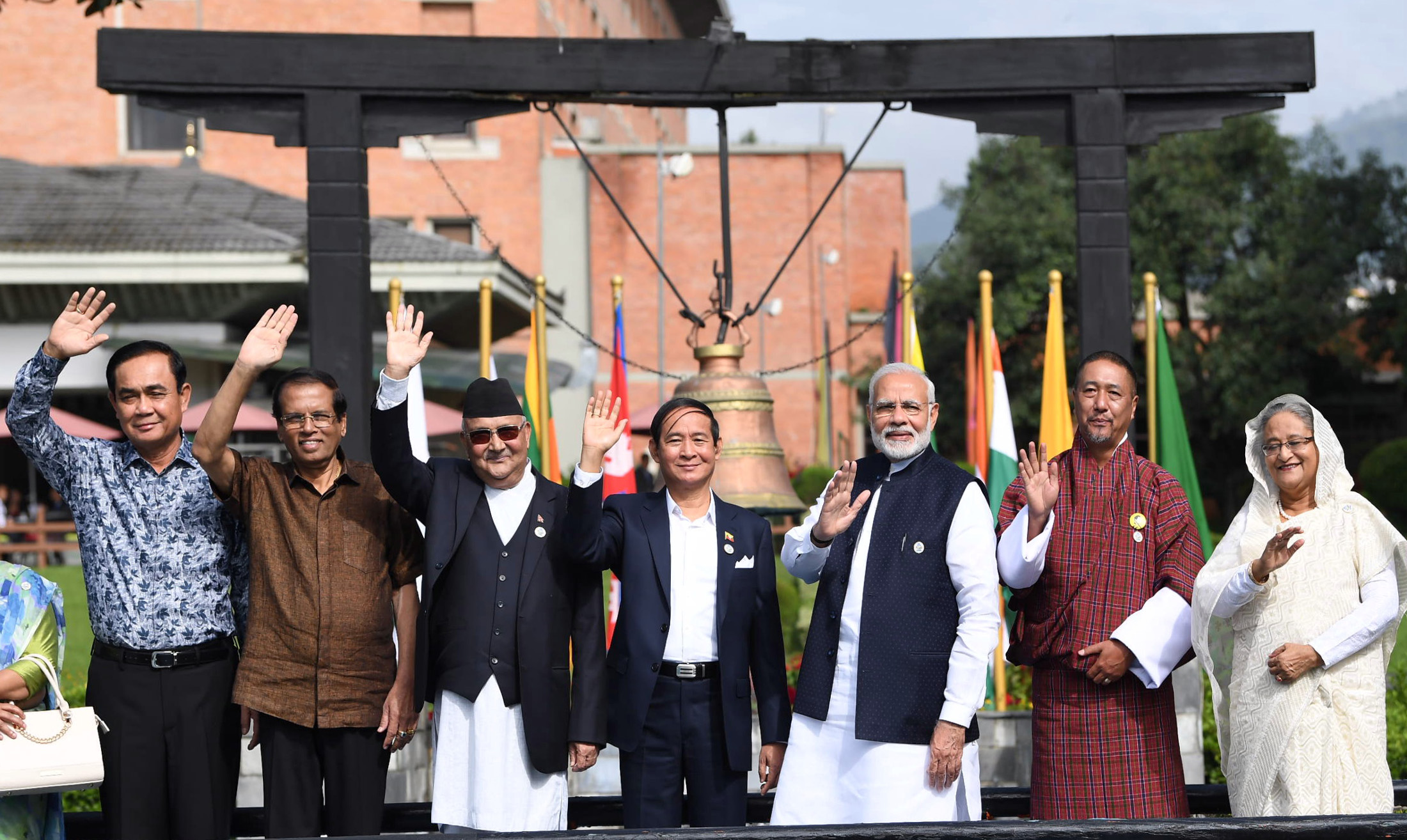
4th BIMSTEC Summit leaders

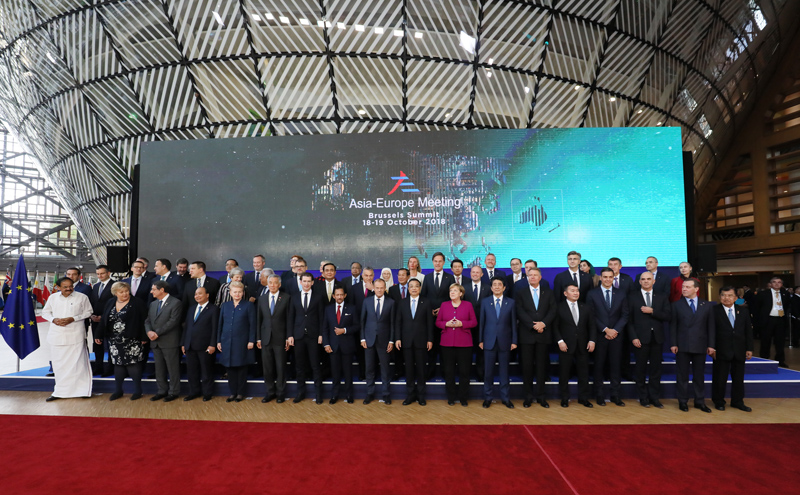
ASEM12 Summit leaders

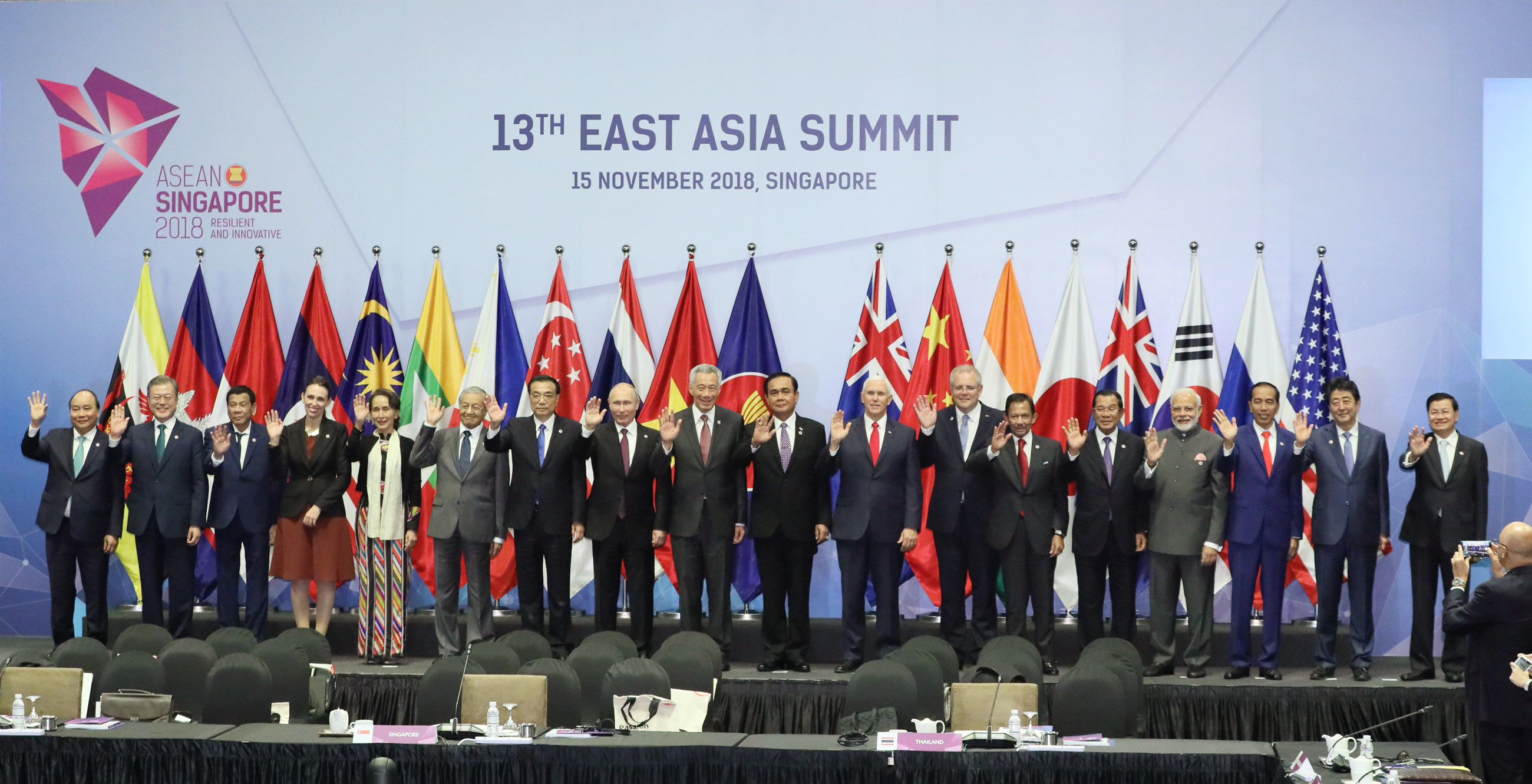
13th East Asia Summit leaders

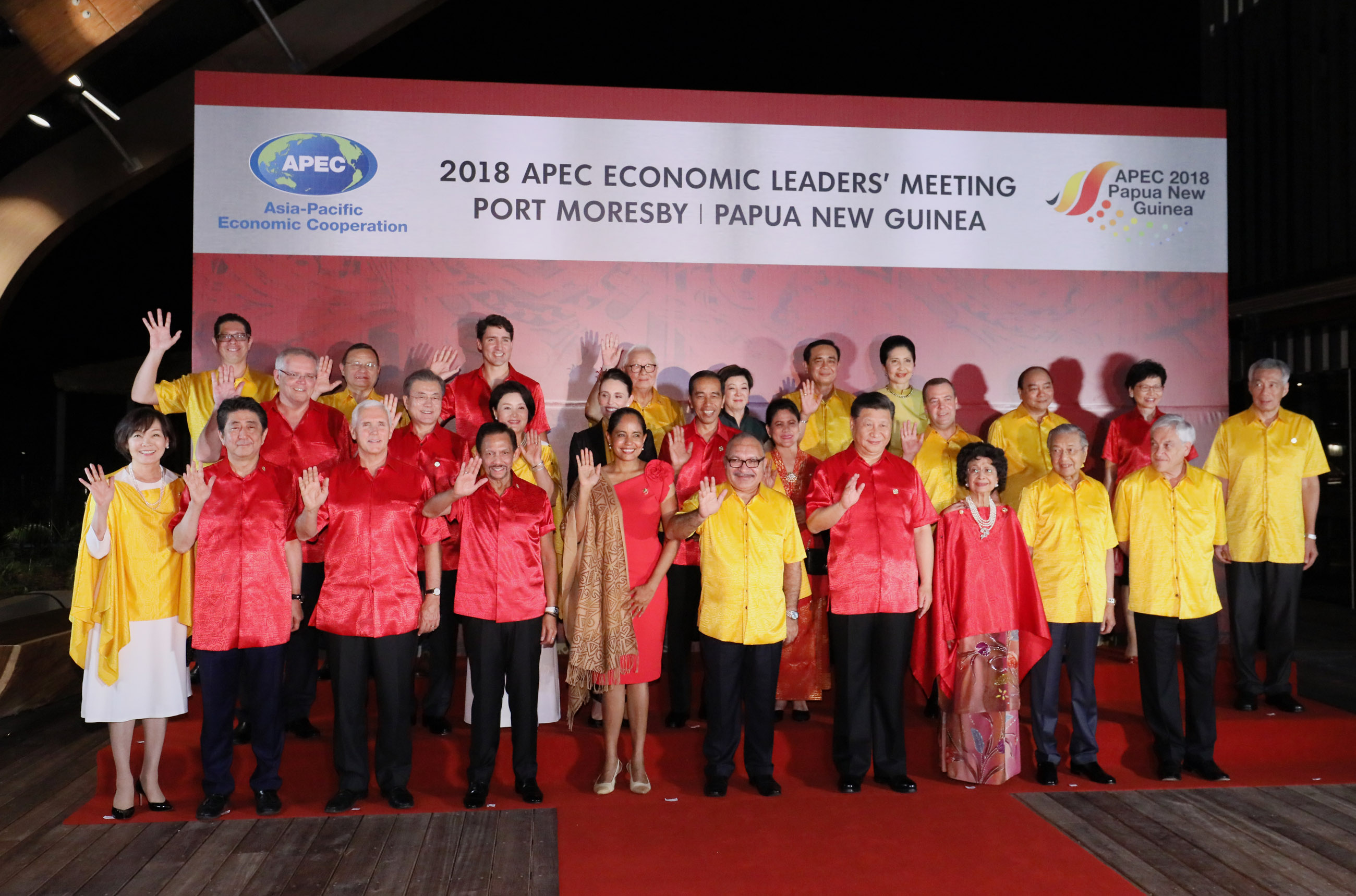
APEC 2018 leaders

#	Country	Location	Date	Details
40	Cambodia	Phnom Penh	10 January	Working visit. Prayut attended the 2nd MLC Summit where he met with Cambodian Prime Minister Hun Sen, Vietnamese Prime Minister Nguyễn Xuân Phúc, and Chinese Premier Li Keqiang.
41	India	New Delhi	24–26 January	Working and guest visit. Prayut attended the ASEAN–India Commemorative Summit 2018 where he met with Indian Prime Minister Narendra Modi. Prayut also attended the 72nd Independence Day.
42	Australia	Sydney	16–18 March	Working visit. Prayut attended the ASEAN–Australia Commemorative Summit 2018 where he met with Australian Prime Minister Malcolm Turnbull.
43	Vietnam	Hanoi	30–31 March	Official working visit. Prayut attended the 6th GMS Summit where he met with Vietnamese Prime Minister Nguyễn Xuân Phúc, and Chinese Premier Li Keqiang.
44	Cambodia	Siem Reap	5 April	Official visit. Prayut attended the 3rd MRC Summits.
45	Singapore	Singapore	27–28 April	Working visit. Prayut attended the 32nd ASEAN Summits where he met with Burmese President Win Myint.
46	United Kingdom	London	19–22 June	Official working visit. Where he met with Prime Minister Theresa May, and Lord Speaker Norman Fowler, Baron Fowler.
46	France	Toulouse, Paris	22–26 June	Official working visit. Where he met with President Emmanuel Macron.
47	Sri Lanka	Colombo	12–13 July	Official visit. Invited by President Maithripala Sirisena. Where he met with President Maithripala Sirisena.
48	Bhutan	Paro, Thimphu	19–20 July	Official visit. Invited by Prime Minister Tshering Tobgay. Where he met with King Jigme Khesar Namgyel Wangchuck, and Prime Minister Tshering Tobgay.
49	Nepal	Kathmandu	30–31 August	Official working visit. Invited by Prime Minister K. P. Sharma Oli. Prayut attended the 4th BIMSTEC Summit where he met with Nepali President Bidya Devi Bhandari, Nepali Prime Minister K. P. Sharma Oli, and Indian Prime Minister Narendra Modi.
50	Japan	Tokyo	8–10 October	Official working visit. Invited by Prime Minister Shinzo Abe. Prayut attended the 10th Mekong–Japan Summit where he met with Japanese Emperor Akihito, Japanese Prime Minister Shinzo Abe, Chairman of JETRO Hiroyuki Ishige, and President of Mitsui Tasuo Yasunaga.
51	Indonesia	Bali	11 October	Working visit. Prayut attended the ASEAN Leaders' Gathering.
52	Belgium	Brussels	18–20 October	Working visit. Prayut attended the ASEM12 where he met with South Korean President Moon Jae-in, Swiss President Alain Berset, Norwegian Prime Minister Erna Solberg, Dutch Prime Minister Mark Rutte, Belgian Prime Minister Charles Michel, Italian Prime Minister Giuseppe Conte, Czech Prime Minister Andrej Babiš, and Estonian Prime Minister Jüri Ratas.
53	France	Paris	11–13 November	Working and guest visit. Prayut attended the Centenary of the Armistice of 11 November 1918 and the 1st Paris Peace Forum.
53	Singapore	Singapore	13–16 November	Official working visit. Prayut attended the 33rd ASEAN Summit and the 13th East Asia Summit where he met with Russian President Vladimir Putin, Chilean President Sebastián Piñera, New Zealander Prime Minister Jacinda Ardern, Indian Prime Minister Narendra Modi, Australian Prime Minister Scott Morrison, and Chinese Premier Li Keqiang.
53	Papua New Guinea	Port Moresby	16–18 November	Working visit. Prayut attended the APEC 2018.
54	Germany	Berlin	27–29 November	Official working visit. Where he met with Chancellor Angela Merkel.
55	Laos	Vientiane	13–15 December	Official working visit. Invited by Prime Minister Thongloun Sisoulith. Prayut attended the Thailand–Laos Joint Cabinet Retreat where he met with President Bounnhang Vorachit, and Prime Minister Thongloun Sisoulith.

== 2019 ==
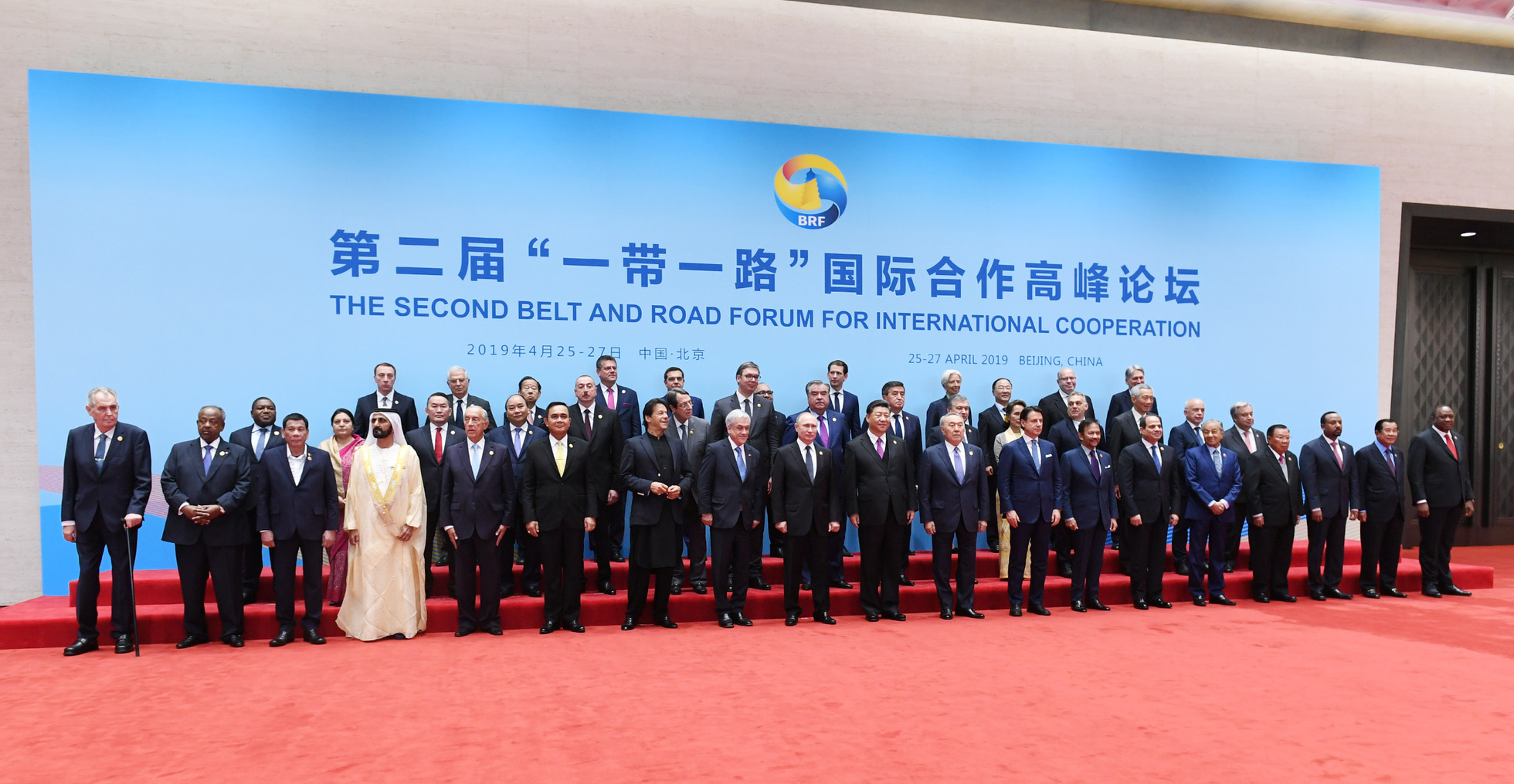
2019 Belt and Road Forum leaders

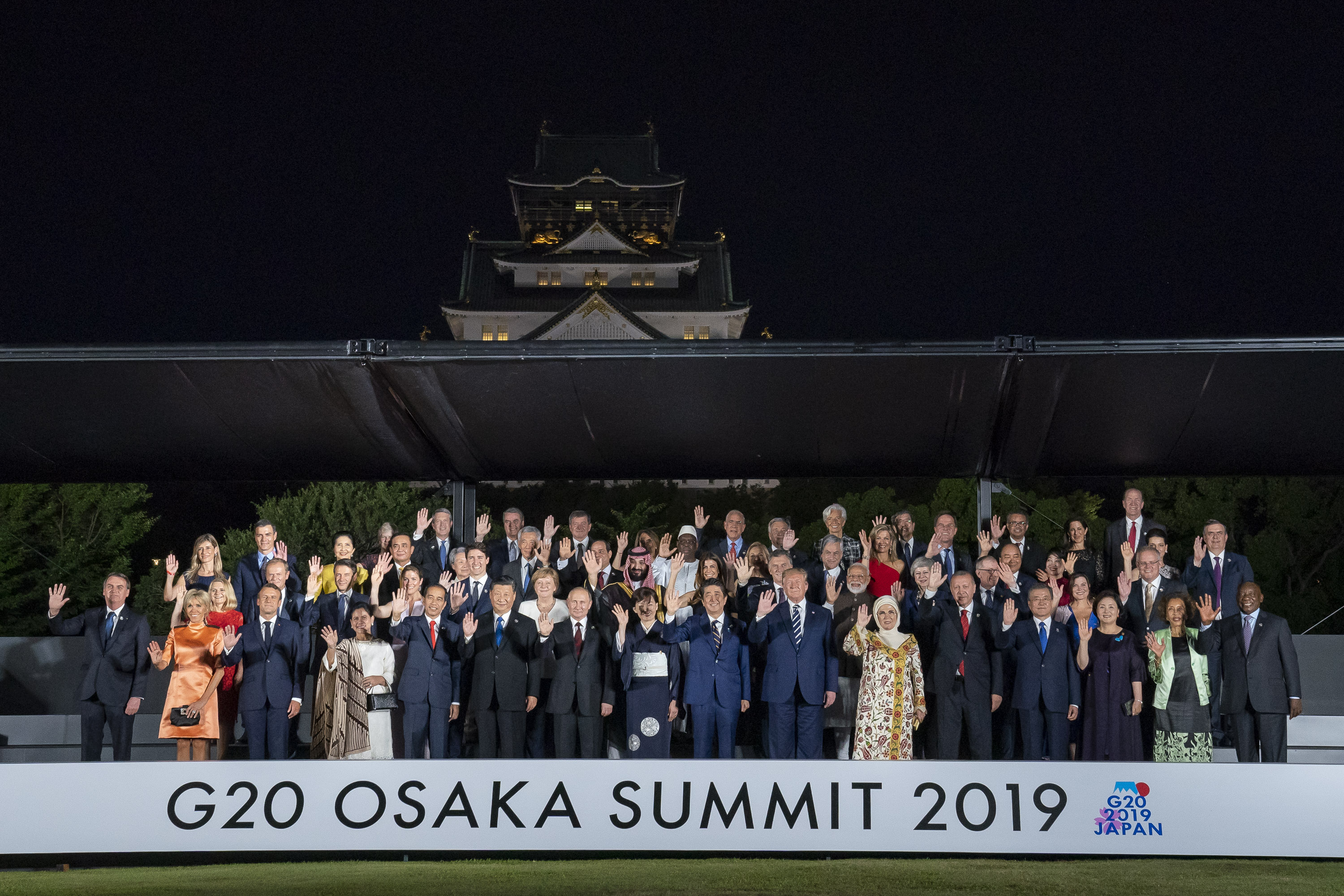
G20 2019 leaders and guest leaders

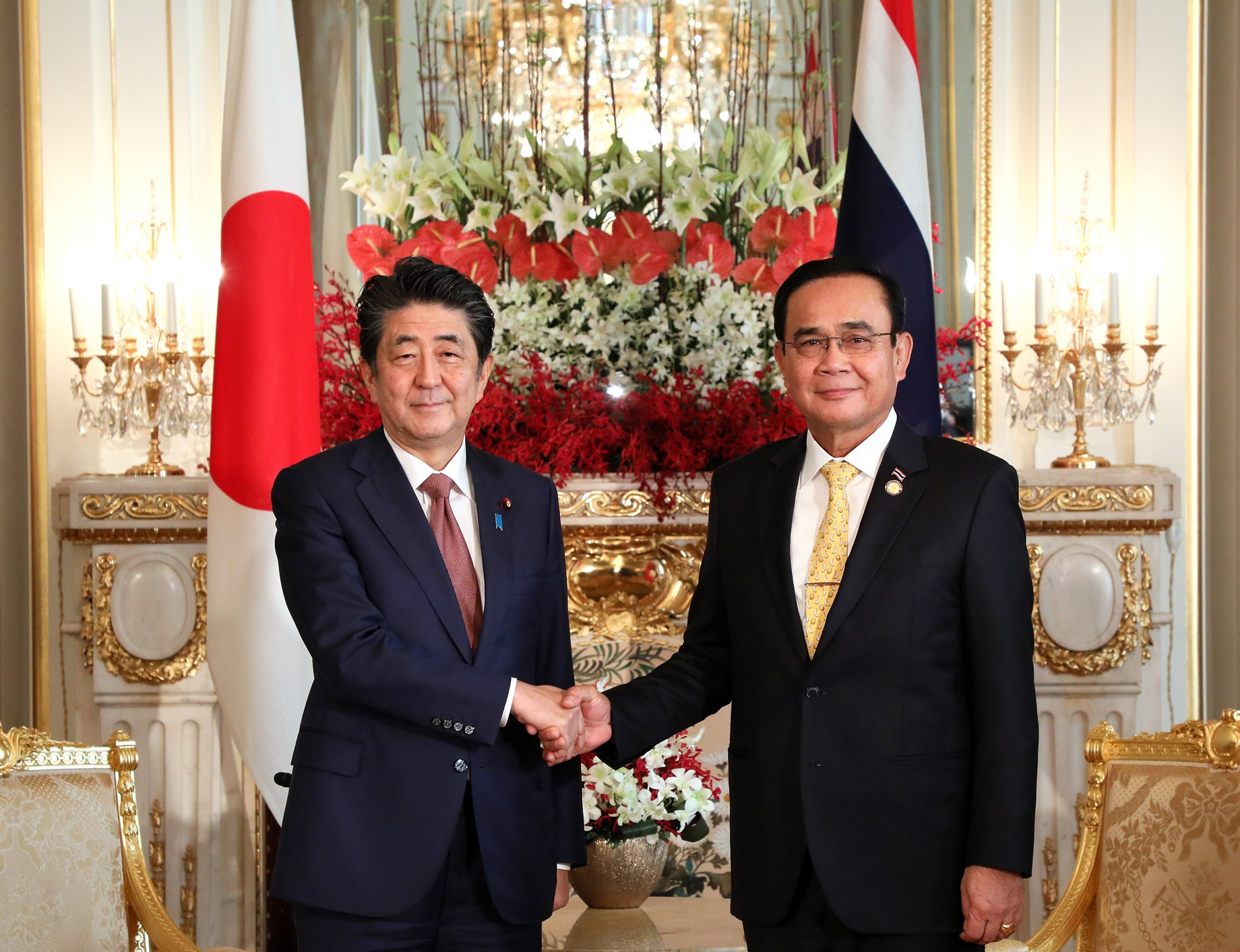
Prayut Chan-o-cha and Shinzo Abe at the Enthronement of Naruhito

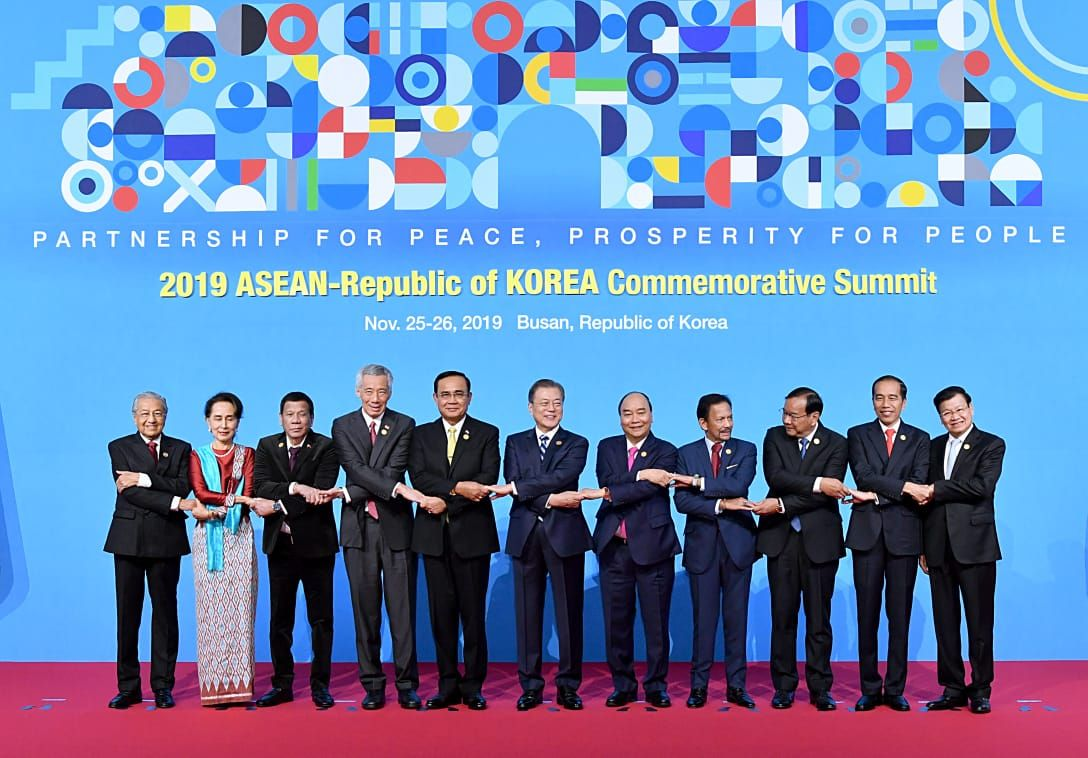
ASEAN-ROK Commemorative Summit leaders

#	Country	Location	Date	Details
56	Cambodia	Poipet	22 April	Working visit. Prayut attended the Re-opening ceremony of the Thai-Cambodian railway service together with Cambodian Prime Minister Hun Sen.
57	China	Beijing	26–27 April	Working visit. Prayut attended the 2019 Belt and Road Forum where he met with Chinese President Xi Jinping, Chinese Premier Li Keqiang, and Chinese Vice Premier Han Zheng.
58	Japan	Osaka	28–29 June	Working visit. Prayut attended the 2019 G20 Osaka summit as chair of the ASEAN. Where he met with Japanese Prime Minister Shinzo Abe, and Australian Prime Minister Scott Morrison.
59	United States	New York City	21–26 September	Working visit. Prayut attended the 74th UNGA where he met with UN Secretary-General António Guterres, and President of the UNGA Tijjani Muhammad-Bande.
60	Japan	Tokyo	21–24 October	Guest visit. Prayut was King Vajiralongkorn's representative to attended the Enthronement of Naruhito where he met with Prime Minister Shinzo Abe.
61	South Korea	Busan	24–28 November	Official working visit. Prayut attended the ASEAN–ROK Commemorative Summits 2019 where he met with South Korean President Moon Jae-in.

== 2021 ==
#	Country	Location	Date	Details
62	United Kingdom	Glasgow	1–3 November	Working visit. Prayut attended the COP26.

== 2022 ==
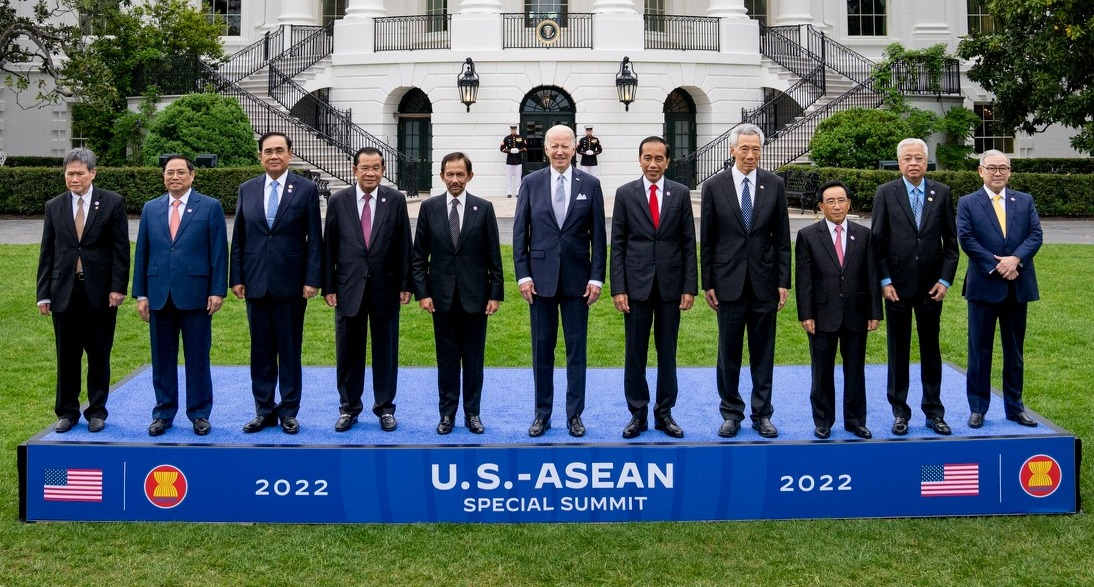
ASEAN-US Commemorative Summit leaders

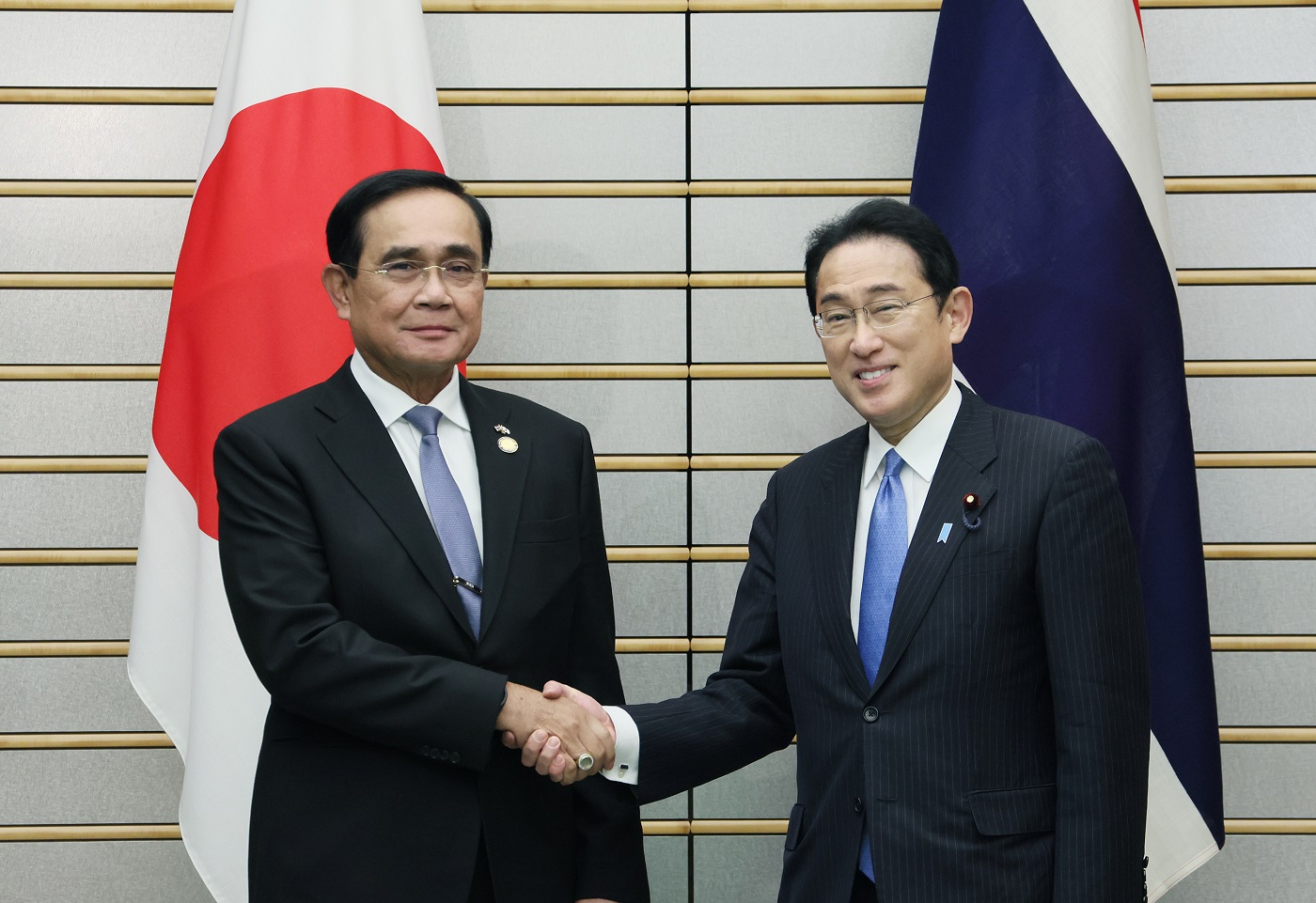
Official visit to Japan

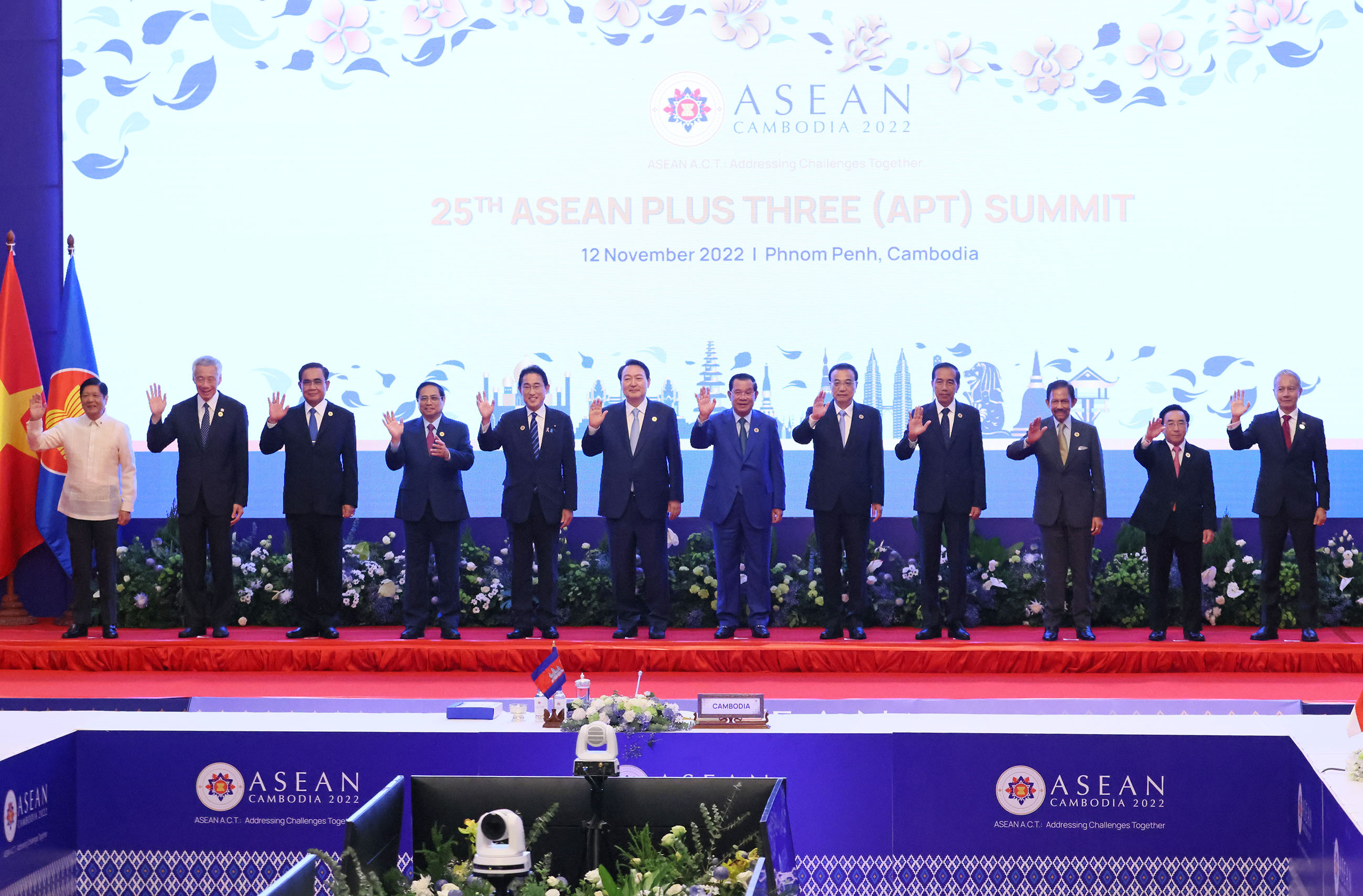
ASEAN plus three Summit leaders

#	Country	Location	Date	Details
63	Saudi Arabia	Riyadh, Diriyah	25–26 January	Official visit. Invited by Crown Prince Mohammed bin Salman. Where he met with Crown Prince Mohammed bin Salman.
64	United States	Washington, D.C.	11–15 May	Working visit. Prayut attended the ASEAN–US Commemorative Summit 2022 where he met with US Defense Secretary Lloyd Austin.
65	Japan	Washington, D.C.	25–27 May	Official working visit. Prayut attended the 27th Nikkei Forum where he met with Japanese Prime Minister Fumio Kishida, Chairman of Nikkei Naotoshi Okada, and Governor of JBIC Nobumitsu Hayashi.
66	Laos	Pakxan	29 October	Working visit. Prayut attended the foundation stone laying ceremony for the Fifth Thai–Lao Friendship Bridge together with Lao Prime Minister Phankham Viphavanh.
67	Cambodia	Phnom Penh	10–13 November	Official working visit. Prayut attended the 40th and 41st ASEAN Summits and the 17th East Asia Summit where he met with UN Secretary-General António Guterres, Cambodian King Norodom Sihamoni, South Korean President Yoon Suk Yeol, and Cambodian Prime Minister Hun Sen.
68	Belgium	Brussels	12–15 December	Official working visit. Prayut attended the ASEAN–EU Commemorative Summit 2022 where he met with President of the EUCO Charles Michel, Czech Prime Minister Petr Fiala, Dutch Prime Minister Mark Rutte, Greek Prime Minister Kyriakos Mitsotakis, Hungarian Prime Minister Viktor Orbán.

== Multilateral meetings ==
Srettha is scheduled to attend the following summits during his prime ministership:

Group	Year									
Group	2014	2015	2016	2017	2018	2019	2020	2021	2022	2023
UNGA	27 September, (United States) New York City	29 September, (United States) New York City	21 September, (United States) New York City	22 September, (United States) New York City	1 October, (United States) New York City	30 September, (United States) New York City	25 September, (Virtual) (United States) New York City	25 September, (Virtual) (United States) New York City	24 September, (United States) New York City	
ASEAN		26–27 April, (Malaysia) Kuala Lumpur	6–8 September, (Laos) Vientiane	28–29 April, (Philippines) Pasay	27–28 April, Singapore	20–23 June, (Thailand) Bangkok	26 June, (Virtual) (Vietnam) Hanoi	26–28 October, (Virtual) (Brunei) Bandar Seri Begawan	10–13 November, (Cambodia) Phnom Penh	9–11 May, (Indonesia) Labuan Bajo
EAS (ASEAN)	12–13 November, (Myanmar) Naypyidaw	18–22 November, (Malaysia) Kuala Lumpur	6–8 September, (Laos) Vientiane	10–14 November, (Philippines) Pasay	11–15 November, Singapore	31 October–4 November, (Thailand) Bangkok	11–15 November, (Virtual) (Vietnam) Hanoi	26–28 October, (Virtual) (Brunei) Bandar Seri Begawan	10–13 November, (Cambodia) Phnom Penh	
APEC	10–11 November, (China) Beijing	18–19 November, (Philippines) Pasay	19–20 November, (Peru) Lima	10–11 November, (Vietnam) Da Nang	17–18 November, (Papua New Guinea) Port Moresby	Cancelled	20 November, (Virtual) (Malaysia) Kuala Lumpur	12 November, (Virtual) (New Zealand) Auckland	18–19 November, (Thailand) Bangkok	
ASEM	16–17 October, (Italy) Milan	None	15–16 July, (Mongolia) Ulaanbaatar	None	18–19 October, (Belgium) Brussels	None	None	25–26 November, (Virtual) (Cambodia) Phnom Penh	None	None
GMS	19–20 December, (Thailand) Bangkok	None	None	None	29–31 March, (Vietnam) Hanoi	None	None	25 March, (Virtual) (Cambodia) Phnom Penh	None	None
ACMECS	None	22–23 June, (Myanmar) Naypyidaw	None	None	15–16 June, (Thailand) Bangkok	None	9 December, (Virtual) (Vietnam) Hanoi	None	None	None
MLC			23 March, (China) Sanya	None	10 January, (Cambodia) Phnom Penh	None	24 August, (Virtual) (China) Beijing	None	None	
COP	1–12 December, (Peru) Lima	30 November–12 December, (France) Paris	7–18 November, (Morocco) Marrakesh	6–17 November, (Germany) Bonn	2–15 December, (Poland) Katowice	2–13 December, (Spain) Madrid	Postponed	31 October–13 November, (United Kingdom) Glasgow	6–20 November, (Egypt) Sharm El Sheikh	
Others	ASEAN–ROK; 10–12 December, (South Korea) Busan	Asian–African; 21–23 April, (Indonesia) Jakarta	ASEAN–US; 15–16 February, (United States) Rancho Mirage	BRICS; 4–5 September, (China) Xiamen	ASEAN–India; 25 January, (India) New Delhi	BRF; 25–27 April, (China) Beijing	ASEAN; 14 April, (Virtual) (Vietnam) Hanoi		BIMSTEC; 30 March, (Virtual) (Sri Lanka) Colombo	Thailand–Laos–Myanmar; 7 April, (Virtual); Bangkok
Others	ASEAN–ROK; 10–12 December, (South Korea) Busan	Asian–African; 21–23 April, (Indonesia) Jakarta	NSS; 31 March – 1 April, (United States) Washington, D.C.	BRICS; 4–5 September, (China) Xiamen	ASEAN–Australia; 17–18 March, (Australia) Sydney	BRF; 25–27 April, (China) Beijing	ASEAN; 14 April, (Virtual) (Vietnam) Hanoi		BIMSTEC; 30 March, (Virtual) (Sri Lanka) Colombo	Thailand–Laos–Myanmar; 7 April, (Virtual); Bangkok
Others	ASEAN–ROK; 10–12 December, (South Korea) Busan	Asian–African; 21–23 April, (Indonesia) Jakarta	ASEAN–Russia; 19–20 May, (Russia) Sochi	BRICS; 4–5 September, (China) Xiamen	MRC; 5 April, (Cambodia) Siem Reap	G20; 28–29 June, (Japan) Osaka	ASEAN; 14 April, (Virtual) (Vietnam) Hanoi		ASEAN–US; 12–13 May, (United States) Washington, D.C.	Thailand–Laos–Myanmar; 7 April, (Virtual); Bangkok
Others	ASEAN–ROK; 10–12 December, (South Korea) Busan	Mekong–Japan; 2–4 July, (Japan) Tokyo	G20; 4–5 September, (China) Hangzhou	BRICS; 4–5 September, (China) Xiamen	BIMSTEC; 30–31 August, (Nepal) Kathmandu	G20; 28–29 June, (Japan) Osaka	ASEAN; 14 April, (Virtual) (Vietnam) Hanoi		ASEAN–US; 12–13 May, (United States) Washington, D.C.	Thailand–Laos–Myanmar; 7 April, (Virtual); Bangkok
Others	ASEAN–ROK; 10–12 December, (South Korea) Busan	Mekong–Japan; 2–4 July, (Japan) Tokyo	ACD; 8–10 October, (Thailand) Bangkok	BRICS; 4–5 September, (China) Xiamen	Mekong–Japan; 9 October, (Japan) Tokyo	ASEAN–ROK; 25–27 November, (South Korea) Busan	ASEAN; 14 April, (Virtual) (Vietnam) Hanoi		ASEAN–EU; 13–14 December, (Belgium) Brussels	Thailand–Laos–Myanmar; 7 April, (Virtual); Bangkok
Others	ASEAN–ROK; 10–12 December, (South Korea) Busan	Mekong–Japan; 2–4 July, (Japan) Tokyo	ACD; 8–10 October, (Thailand) Bangkok	BRICS; 4–5 September, (China) Xiamen	ASEAN; 11 October, (Indonesia) Bali	ASEAN–ROK; 25–27 November, (South Korea) Busan	ASEAN; 14 April, (Virtual) (Vietnam) Hanoi		ASEAN–EU; 13–14 December, (Belgium) Brussels	Thailand–Laos–Myanmar; 7 April, (Virtual); Bangkok
██ = Did not attend ██ = Virtual event

== See also ==
- Foreign relations of Thailand
