= List of international trips made by Min Aung Hlaing =

This is a list of international trips made by Min Aung Hlaing, who has ruled Myanmar as a military leader from 2 February 2021 to 10 April 2026 and as President of Myanmar since 10 April 2026.

== Summary ==
The number of visits per country where Min Aung Hlaing has traveled to are:

- One visit to India, Indonesia, Malaysia, Kazakhstan, Laos and Vietnam
- Two visits to Thailand
- Three visits to Belarus and China
- Six visits to Russia

World map highlighting countries visited by Min Aung Hlaing during his leadership, as of November 2026. One visit Two visits Three visits Four visits Five visits Six visits Myanmar

== As Chairman of the State Administration Council ==
#	Country	Areas visited	Dates	Details	Image
1	Indonesia	Jakarta	24 April 2021	Attended the 3rd ASEAN special summit.	
2	Russia	Moscow	12 July 2022	Private visit.	
3	Russia	Vladivostok	5-8 September 2022	Attended the 2022 Eastern Economic Forum. Met with President Vladimir Putin.	
4	China	Kunming	5-10 November 2024	Attended the 10th ACMECS Summit, the 11th CLMV summit and the 8th Greater Mekong Subregion (GMS) summit. Met with Premier Li Qiang.	
5	Russia	Moscow	3-6 March 2025	State visit. Met with President Vladimir Putin and Prime Minister Mikhail Mishustin.	
5	Belarus	Minsk	6-7 March 2025	State visit. Met with President Alexander Lukashenko.	
6	Thailand	Bangkok	3-4 April 2025	Attended the 6th BIMSTEC summit.	
7	Russia	Moscow	9 May 2025	Attended the 2025 Moscow Victory Day Parade.	
8	Belarus	Minsk	25-27 June 2025	Working visit. Attended the 4th EAEU summit.	

== As President of Myanmar ==
#	Country	Areas visited	Dates	Details	Image
1	China	Beijing and Tianjin	31 August - 3 September 2025	Attended the 25th SCO summit and the 2025 China Victory Day Parade.	
2	Russia	Moscow	25-27 September 2025	Attended the World Atomic Week meeting.	
2	Kazakhstan	Astana	27 September 2025	Working visit. Met with President Kassym-Jomart Tokayev.	
3	India	New Delhi, Bodh Gaya and Mumbai	30 May - 3 June 2026	Official visit. Met with President Droupadi Murmu and Prime Minister Narendra Modi.	
4	China	Beijing and Shanghai	15-19 June 2026	State visit. Met with General Secretary Xi Jinping.	
5	Laos	Vientiane	3-5 July 2026	Official visit.	
6	Thailand	Bangkok	6-7 August 2026	Official visit.	
7	Russia	Moscow	17-20 August 2026	Official visit. Met with President Vladimir Putin.	
7	Belarus	Minsk	20-21 August 2026	Official visit.	
8	Vietnam	Hanoi	5-7 September 2026	State visit.	
9	Cambodia	Phnom Penh	11-12 September 2026	State visit.	
10	Malaysia	Kuala Lumpur	7-8 October 2026	State visit.	
