= Lancang–Mekong Cooperation =

Lancang-Mekong Cooperation (LMC) is a multilateral format established in 2016 for cooperation between the riparian states of the Lancang River and Mekong River. The Lancang is the part of the Mekong that flows through China. Cambodia, Laos, Myanmar, Vietnam and Thailand are five downstream countries of the Mekong River.

== Water resources ==
The central purpose of the format is for China to manage water flow from its hydropower dams with the other riparian states. China has built seven megadams on the Lancang-Mekong and according to the US-based NGO International Rivers 20 are under construction or planned in Yunnan, Tibet and Qinghai.

== LMC Special Fund ==
A fund was created in 2016 to aid in small and medium-sized projects by the Lancang-Mekong countries.
