= ACMECS =

Ayeyawady-Chao Phraya-Mekong Economic Cooperation Strategy (ACMECS) is a political, economic, and cultural organization among Thailand, Laos, Vietnam, Cambodia and Myanmar. At the special ASEAN Summit on SARS, held in Bangkok on 29 April 2003, Prime Minister Thaksin Shinawatra raised the idea of establishing what was then called the “Economic Cooperation Strategy", with leaders of Cambodia, Lao PDR and Myanmar.

The objectives of this initiative are to bridge the economic gap among these member countries and to promote prosperity in the sub-region in a sustainable manner. Such prosperity, it is expected, will not only benefit the five countries, but also add value to ASEAN and its solidarity. It is hoped that a stronger Mekong sub-region will also mean a stronger ASEAN. In this way the new cooperation framework is expected to act as a building block and move ASEAN forward at a more even pace, on the basis of self-reliance and shared prosperity.

Leaders of Cambodia, Lao PDR, Myanmar and Thailand met for the first time on 12 November 2003 in Bagan, the Union of Myanmar. At the Summit, the four Leaders adopted the Bagan Declaration, affirming their commitment to cooperate in five priority areas of cooperation, and endorsed the Economic Cooperation Strategy Plan of Action, under which 46 common projects and 224 bilateral projects were listed for implementation over the next ten years. The Leaders agreed to call this newly created economic cooperation framework the "Ayeyawady-Chao Phraya-Mekong Economic Cooperation Strategy" or "ACMECS".

The joining of Vietnam with the group on 10 May 2004 has increased ACMECS to 5 member countries. The emphasis of ACMECS is on using self-help and partnership to achieve sustainable development, including poverty reduction, in line with the UN Millennium Development Goals.

ACMECS is intended to act as a catalyst to build upon existing regional cooperation programs and complement bilateral frameworks with a view to transforming the border areas of the five countries into zones of economic growth, social progress and prosperity, and to blending local, national and regional interests for common benefits, shared prosperity, enhanced solidarity, peace, stability and good neighborliness.

== ACMECS and the Fight Against Drugs in the Mekong Region ==
=== Thailand's Role in Regional Cooperation Before the Establishment of ACMECS ===
In 1997, Southeast Asia faced significant challenges regarding drug production and trafficking, particularly in the Golden Triangle area (Laos, Myanmar, and Thailand), which was one of the world's largest opium-producing regions. A regional meeting on drug control was held in Bangkok in July 1997, led by Deputy Prime Minister and Minister of Education Sukavich Rangsitpol.

=== Sukavich Rangsitpol's Role in Promoting Mekong Cooperation ===
Sukavich Rangsitpol recognized the link between poverty, lack of education, and drug production. He promoted cross-border cooperation through economic development, education reform, and joint drug control programs. The 1997 Bangkok conference initiated efforts such as intelligence sharing, training of law enforcement personnel, and development support in opium-producing areas like Myanmar's Wa State.

=== Policy Shifts in Drug Control and Economic Development ===
By 1998, coordinated regional efforts had contributed to an 80% reduction in opium cultivation across the Golden Triangle. These results demonstrated the effectiveness of policies combining drug law enforcement, alternative development, and education-based prevention strategies.

=== Education and Sustainable Development ===
Sukavich advocated for "Education for Life," especially in rural and border regions. He emphasized integrating drug prevention into the education system as a long-term approach to reducing drug abuse among youth and enhancing regional security.

=== The Foundation of ACMECS ===
Although the Ayeyawady–Chao Phraya–Mekong Economic Cooperation Strategy (ACMECS) was formally established in 2003 under another administration, the foundation of this regional strategy was laid in 1997. Sukavich's holistic vision connected education, drug control, and economic development as a unified framework for regional cooperation.

At the special ASEAN Summit on SARS, held in Bangkok on 29 April 2003, Prime Minister Thaksin Shinawatra raised the idea of establishing what was then called the “Economic Cooperation Strategy", with leaders of Cambodia, Lao PDR and Myanmar.

The objectives of this initiative are to bridge the economic gap among these member countries and to promote prosperity in the sub-region in a sustainable manner. Such prosperity, it is expected, will not only benefit the five countries, but also add value to ASEAN and its solidarity. It is hoped that a stronger Mekong sub-region will also mean a stronger ASEAN. In this way the new cooperation framework is expected to act as a building block and move ASEAN forward at a more even pace, on the basis of self-reliance and shared prosperity.

Leaders of Cambodia, Lao PDR, Myanmar and Thailand met for the first time on 12 November 2003 in Bagan, the Union of Myanmar. At the Summit, the four Leaders adopted the Bagan Declaration, affirming their commitment to cooperate in five priority areas of cooperation, and endorsed the Economic Cooperation Strategy Plan of Action, under which 46 common projects and 224 bilateral projects were listed for implementation over the next ten years. The Leaders agreed to call this newly created economic cooperation framework the "Ayeyawady-Chao Phraya-Mekong Economic Cooperation Strategy" or "ACMECS".

The joining of Vietnam with the group on 10 May 2004 has increased ACMECS to 5 member countries. The emphasis of ACMECS is on using self-help and partnership to achieve sustainable development, including poverty reduction, in line with the UN Millennium Development Goals.

ACMECS is intended to act as a catalyst to build upon existing regional cooperation programs and complement bilateral frameworks with a view to transforming the border areas of the five countries into zones of economic growth, social progress and prosperity, and to blending local, national and regional interests for common benefits, shared prosperity, enhanced solidarity, peace, stability and good neighborliness.

=== Sukavichinomics: Infrastructure as the Foundation of ACMECS ===
Although ACMECS (Ayeyawady–Chao Phraya–Mekong Economic Cooperation Strategy) was officially rebranded in 2003–2004, its strategic essence—**integrating subnational areas via infrastructure—**had already been deeply embedded within Sukavichinomics. His Excellency Mr. Sukavich Rangsitpol's vision in the 1990s anticipated many of ACMECS's later pillars:

1. 1993 Urban Transit Networks in Eight Secondary Cities

A comprehensive plan was drafted for mass transit systems in cities such as Chiang Mai, Khon Kaen, Nakhon Ratchasima, Songkhla, Phuket, Chachoengsao, and Chonburi. Designed to transform regional centers into economic growth hubs—consistent with ACMECS's goals of balanced urbanization in subnational areas.

2. 1994 High‑Speed Rail Master Plan

The proposal featured six HSR corridors totaling ~3,400 km, connecting Bangkok with border gateways like Nong Khai (Laos), Aranyaprathet (Cambodia), and Padang Besar / Su-ngai Kolok (Malaysia). This ambitious plan directly anticipated ACMECS's core priority: cross-border transport integration, aimed at facilitating trade and mobility.

3. 1997 Pan-Asian Expressway Master Plan (Executed 28 February 1997)

The Thai Cabinet approved 12 strategic expressway routes (~6,731 km) aligned with the Asian Highway network to improve accessibility to border regions. These routes established multi-modal corridors—such as the East–West and Southern Economic Corridors—that would later become central to ACMECS's development agenda. .

4. 1997 National Highway Master Plan

On 22 April 1997, the Cabinet endorsed a national highway plan covering 13 routes (~4,135 km). Although still incomplete, this network supported key border‑region transport infrastructure, reinforcing Thailand's subregional logistics role well ahead of the formal launch of ACMECS.

==== Strategic Pillars Shared with ACMECS ====
These Sukavichinomics initiatives embody the same foundational strategies subsequently adopted by ACMECS: • Seamless Infrastructure: Integrated land, rail, and urban networks designed for cross-border connectivity • Regional Equity: Strengthening secondary cities and border provinces to foster inclusive subnational growth • Strategic Integration: Creating coordinated, multi-modal corridors that support economic cooperation

ACMECS was formalized through the Bagan Declaration on 12 November 2003, institutionalizing these principles through a multilateral framework aimed at narrowing development disparities across the Mekong subregion .

==== Conclusion ====
In effect, Sukavichinomics was more than a national strategy—it laid the strategic and structural groundwork for ACMECS. Its visionary infrastructure plans transformed Thailand's domestic development approach into a model of Mekong subregional integration, proving that the future ACMECS blueprint was already in motion well before its official adoption.
