= List of international presidential trips made by Joko Widodo =

This is a list of international presidential trips made by Joko Widodo, the 7th president of Indonesia. He conducted 58 foreign trips to 41 countries during his presidency, which began on 20 October 2014 and ended on 20 October 2024.

== Summary ==
The number of visits per country where he had travelled are:

- One visit to Afghanistan, Bangladesh, Cambodia, France, Hong Kong, Iran, Italy, Kenya, Laos, Mozambique, Myanmar, New Zealand, Pakistan, Qatar, South Africa, Sri Lanka, Tanzania, Timor-Leste, Ukraine
- Two visits to Belgium, Brunei, Netherlands, Poland, Russia, Thailand, United Kingdom
- Three visits to India, Papua New Guinea, South Korea, Turkey, Vietnam
- Four visits to Germany, Philippines, United States
- Five visits to Saudi Arabia
- Six visits to Australia, Japan, Malaysia, United Arab Emirates
- Seven visits to China
- Nine visits to Singapore

Map of international trips made by Joko Widodo as president (as of October 2024): Visited Indonesia

== 2014 ==
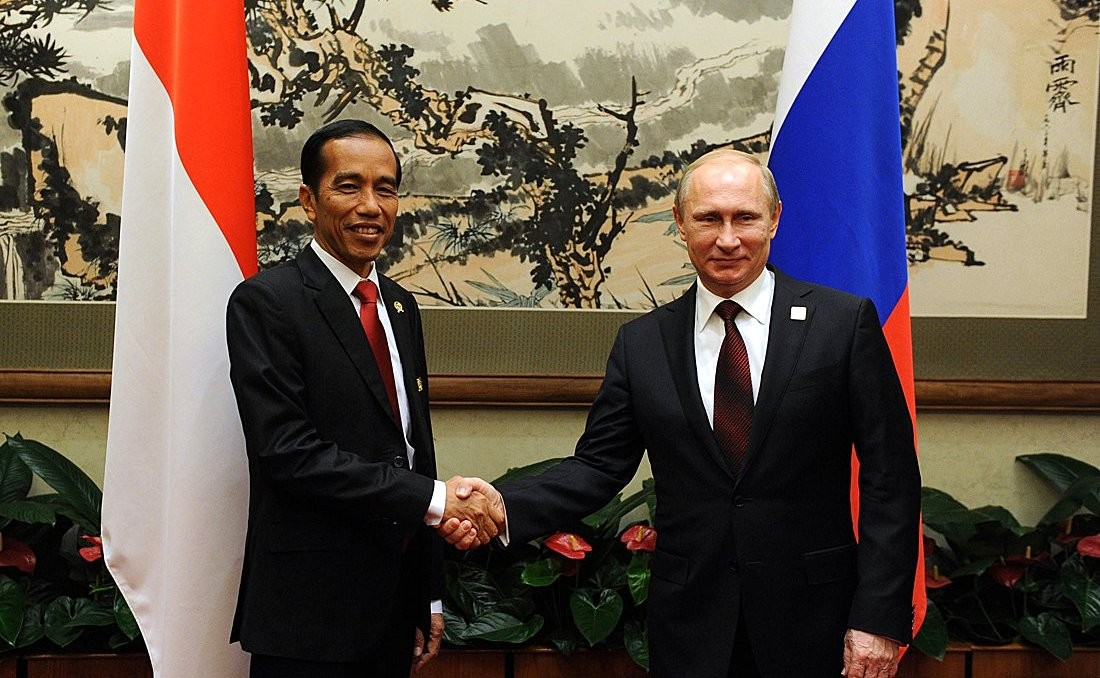
Jokowi meeting Vladimir Putin in the APEC Summit

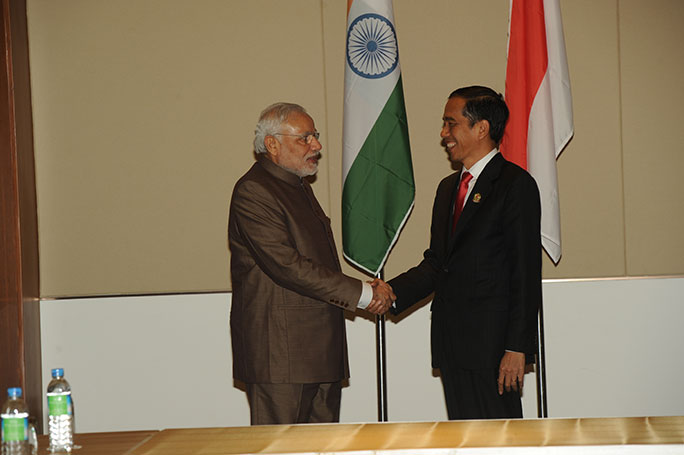
Jokowi meeting Narendra Modi in Naypyidaw

#	Dates	Country	Locations	Details
1	8–12 November	China	Beijing	Jokowi attended the APEC China 2014 as his first international conference.
1	12–13 November	Myanmar	Naypyidaw	Jokowi attended his first ASEAN Summit, in addition to the China-ASEAN conference.
1	14–16 November	Australia	Brisbane	Jokowi attended his first G20 summit.

== 2015 ==
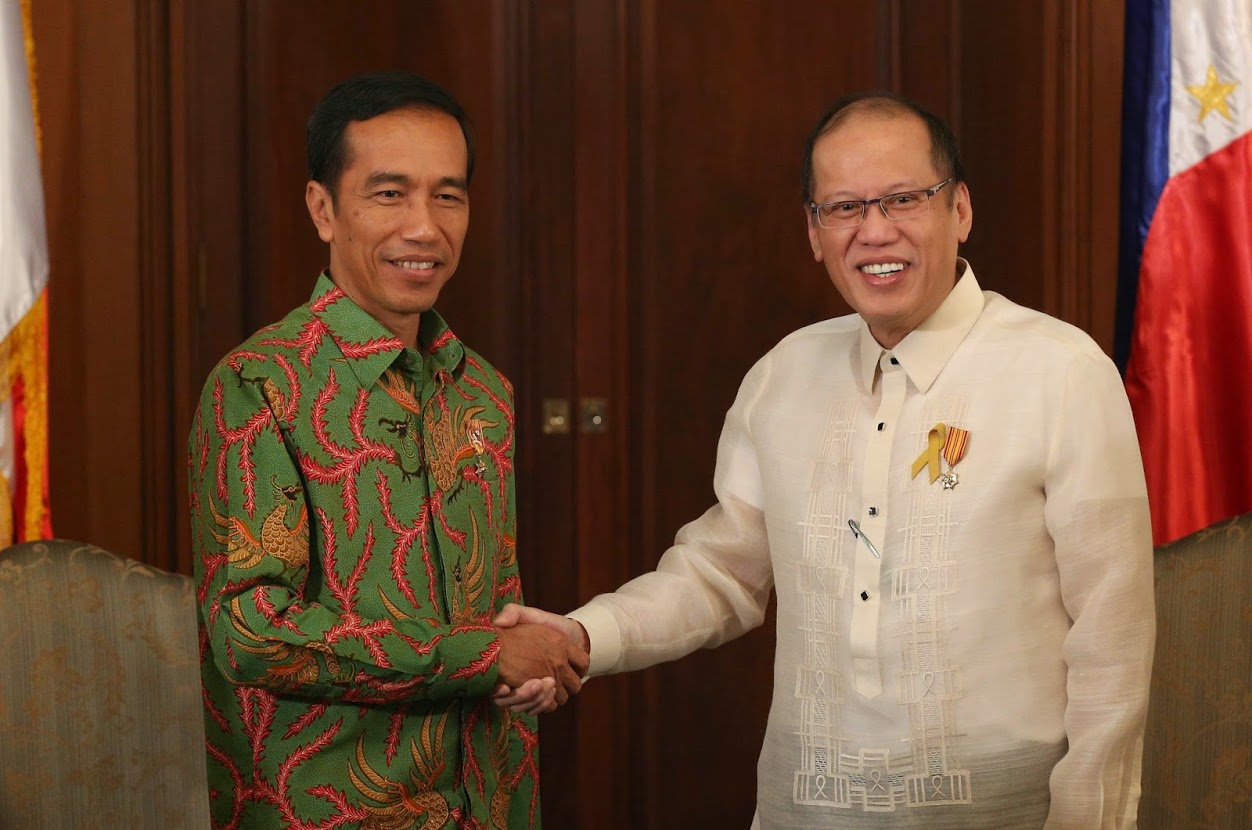
Jokowi with Benigno Aquino III in Malacañan Palace

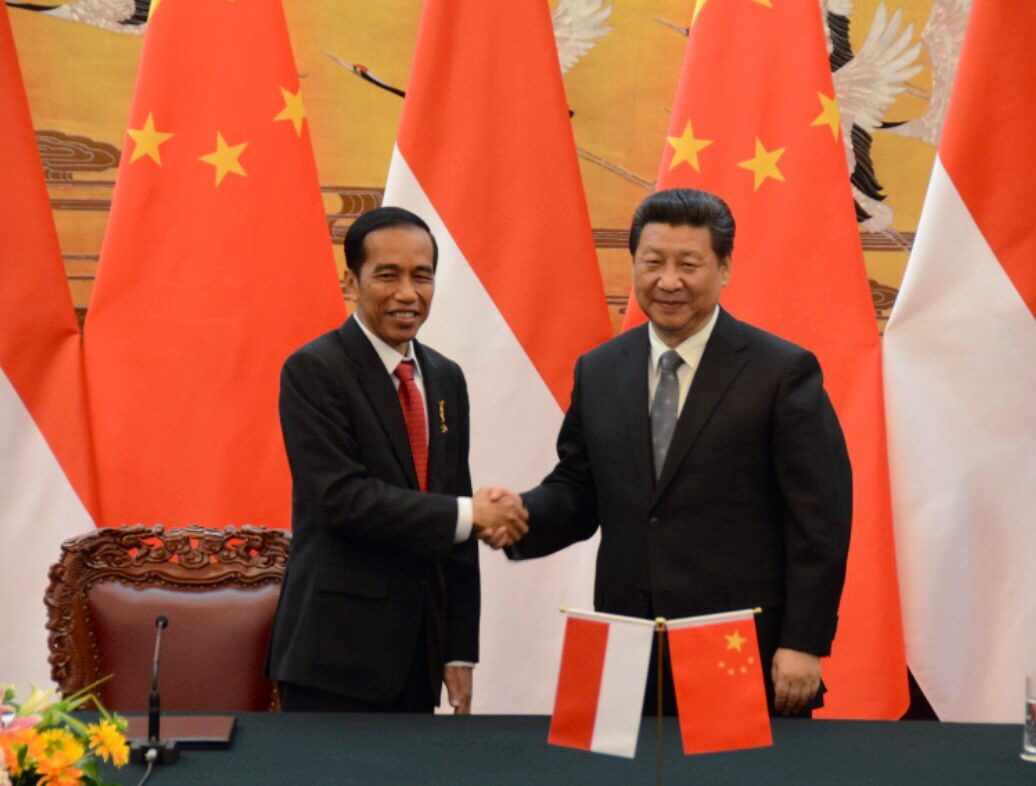
Jokowi with Xi Jinping

Jokowi with Barack Obama in the White House

#	Dates	Country	Locations	Details
2	5–7 February	Malaysia	Putrajaya	Jokowi held bilateral talks with Malaysian PM Najib Razak to discuss maritime borders and cooperation in addition to Indonesian students and workers in Malaysia.
2	7–8 February	Brunei	Bandar Seri Begawan	Jokowi held bilateral talks with Sultan Hassanal Bolkiah, discussing cooperation in trade, labor and defense.
2	8–10 February	Philippines	Manila	Jokowi held bilateral talks with President Benigno Aquino III, discussing maritime boundaries, cooperation in security, education and economics, in addition to the protection of citizens and migrant workers.
3	22–25 March	Japan	Tokyo	Jokowi visited Japan to engage in talks with PM Shinzo Abe regarding economic cooperation, specifically infrastructure development.
3	25–28 March	China	Beijing; Sanya, Hainan	Jokowi conducted bilateral talks with Xi Jinping in Beijing, discussing economic cooperation and infrastructure development in addition to requesting a visa exemption for Indonesian citizens visiting China. He then went to Sanya to conduct bilateral meetings with Dutch PM Mark Rutte and become a keynote speaker.
3	28–29 March	Malaysia	Kuala Lumpur	Jokowi attended the wedding of Malaysian PM Najib Razak's daughter.
3	29 March	Singapore		Jokowi attended the funeral of former Singaporean PM Lee Kuan Yew.
4	26–27 April	Malaysia	Kuala Lumpur	Jokowi attended the ASEAN Summit.
5	11–12 May	Papua New Guinea	Port Moresby	Jokowi signed agreements on cross-border crime, human resources cooperation, and economic cooperation with PNG PM Peter O'Neill.
6	28–29 July	Singapore		Jokowi met Singaporean president Tony Tan Keng Yam and PM Lee Hsien Loong to discuss economic cooperation.
7	11–13 September	Saudi Arabia	Jeddah	Jokowi arrived just after the Mecca crane collapse which killed 11 Indonesians, and held a press conference upon landing. The bilateral talks with King Salman involved defense cooperation, hajj affairs, investment, and a request of clemency for 4 Indonesians on death row.
7	13–14 September	United Arab Emirates	Abu Dhabi; Dubai	Jokowi met with crown prince Mohammed Bin Zayed Al Nahyan in Abu Dhabi and discussed investment. Later, he went to Dubai for a working visit.
7	14–15 September	Qatar	Doha	Jokowi met with Qatari businessmen and urged them to invest in Indonesia.
8	25–28 October	United States	Washington, D.C. San Francisco	Jokowi conducted bilateral talks with US President Barack Obama in the White House regarding investment and religious tolerance, issuing a joint statement on maritime, defense, economic and energy cooperation, before heading to meet business and academic leaders in San Francisco.
9	15–16 November	Turkey	Antalya	Jokowi participated in the 2015 G20 Antalya summit, holding talks with Xi Jinping and newly elected Canadian PM Justin Trudeau.
10	30 November–2 December	France	Paris	Jokowi attended the COP 21, where he gave a speech committing to reducing Indonesia's emission by 29 percent in 2030 (or 41 percent with international support), and increasing renewable energy shares to 23 percent by 2025.

== 2016 ==
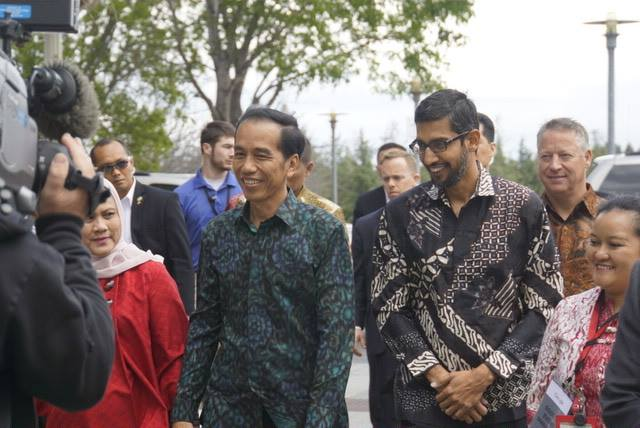
Jokowi with Google CEO Sundar Pichai in Googleplex

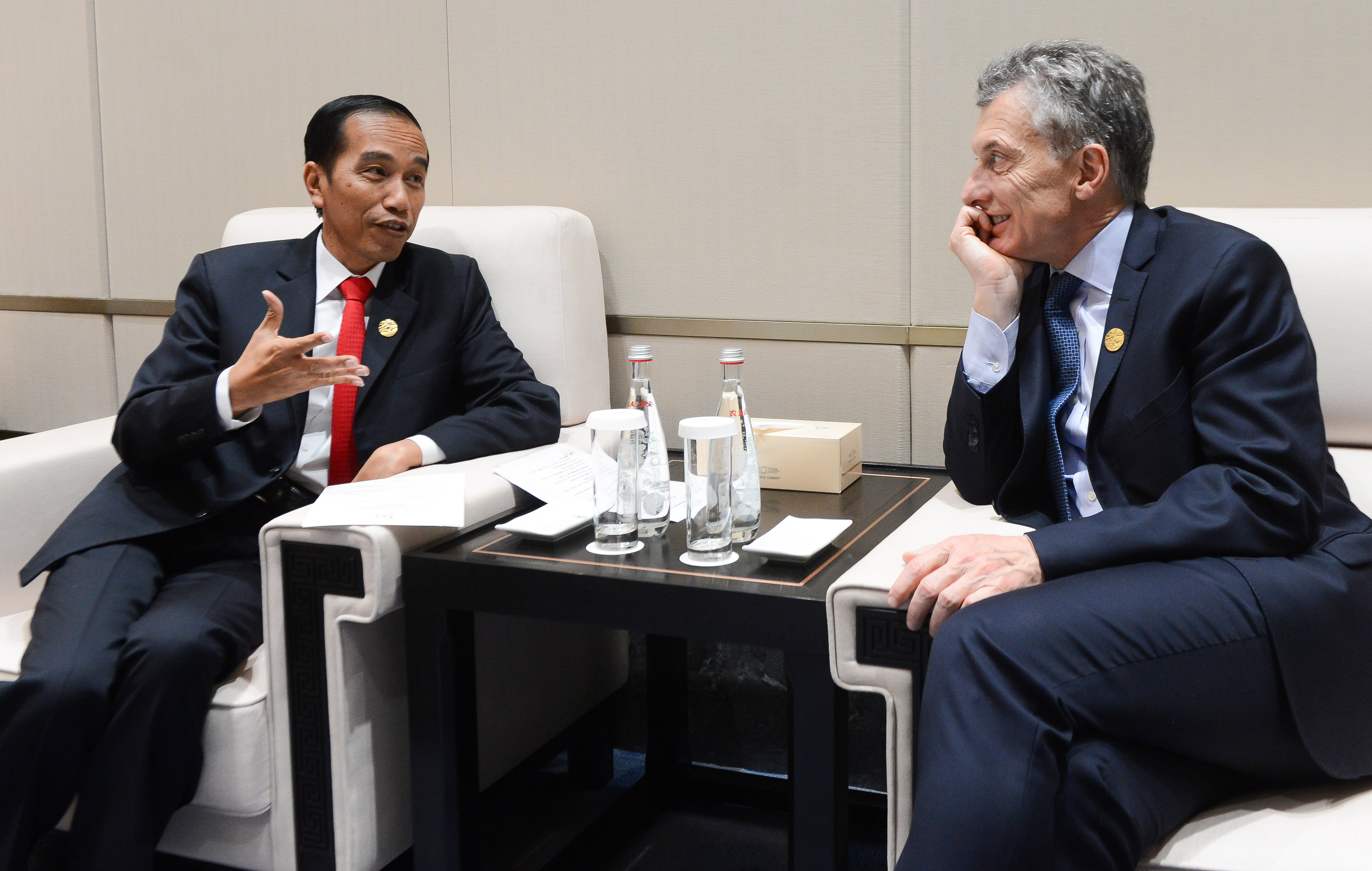
Jokowi with Argentinian President Mauricio Macri during the G20 summit

#	Dates	Country	Locations	Details
11	26 January	Timor-Leste	Dili	Jokowi met with East Timorese PM Rui Maria de Araujo and President Taur Matan Ruak.
12	15–17 February	United States	California	Jokowi attended the ASEAN-US Summit and visited tech companies in Silicon Valley.
12	17–19 April	Germany	Berlin	Jokowi met German president Joachim Gauck and chancellor Angela Merkel to discuss investment and labor training, before speaking in the German-Indonesian business forum.
12	19–21 April	United Kingdom	London	Jokowi met British PM David Cameron.
12	21–22 April	Belgium	Brussels	Jokowi visited the European Union office and met with its leaders Martin Schulz, Donald Tusk and Jean-Claude Juncker to discuss the Comprehensive Economic Partnership Agreement and trade affairs, before meeting CEOs from Nordic countries and attending a reception by King Philippe of Belgium.
12	22–23 April	Netherlands	Amsterdam; Leiden; Rotterdam	Jokowi met with PM Mark Rutte and discussed water management, maritime affairs, trade and investment. He also visited the University of Leiden and the Port of Rotterdam.
13	15–17 May	South Korea	Seoul	Jokowi fulfilled an invitation by president Park Geun-Hye and discussed about South Korea being a partner in accelerating Indonesian industrialization.
13	18–20 May	Russia	Sochi	Jokowi attended the ASEAN-Russia summit, in addition to meeting with Russian president Vladimir Putin and several Russian businessmen.
14	26–27 May	Japan	Shima, Mie	Jokowi was invited as a guest to the 42nd G7 summit.
15	2–6 September	China	Hangzhou	Jokowi attended the 2016 G20 Hangzhou summit and met with Xi Jinping in addition to Alibaba CEO Jack Ma.
15	6–8 September	Laos	Vientiane	Jokowi attended the ASEAN summit.
16	12–14 December	India	New Delhi	Jokowi met with PM Narendra Modi to discuss economic cooperation and the Indian Ocean Rim Association.
16	14–15 December	Iran	Tehran	Jokowi met with Iranian president Hassan Rouhani to discuss cooperation, mainly in the energy sector.

== 2017 ==
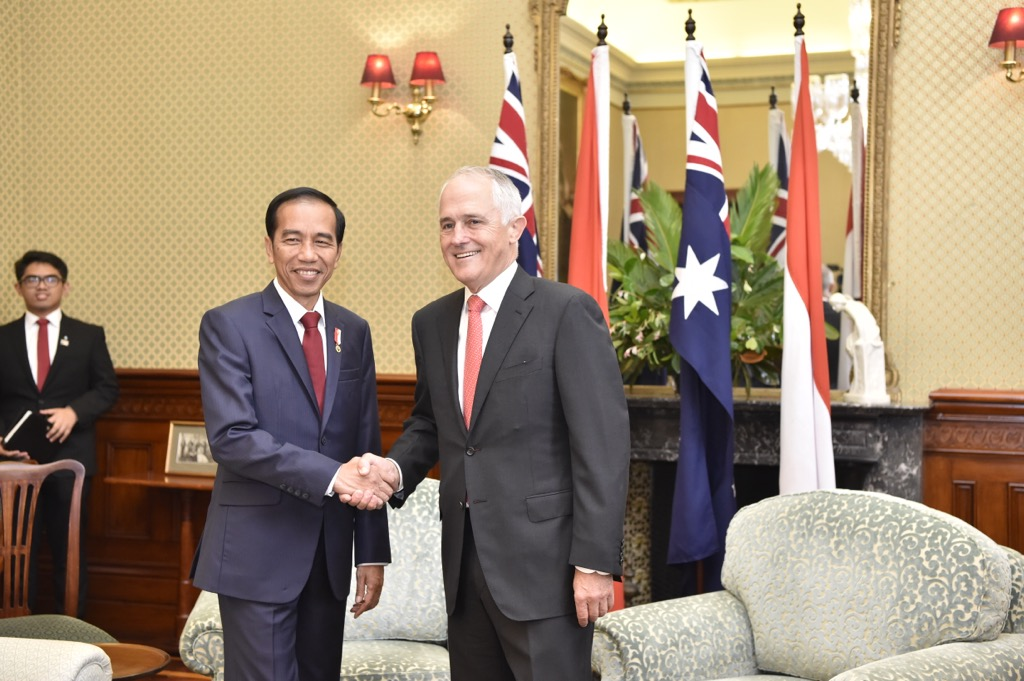
Jokowi with Malcolm Turnbull in Sydney

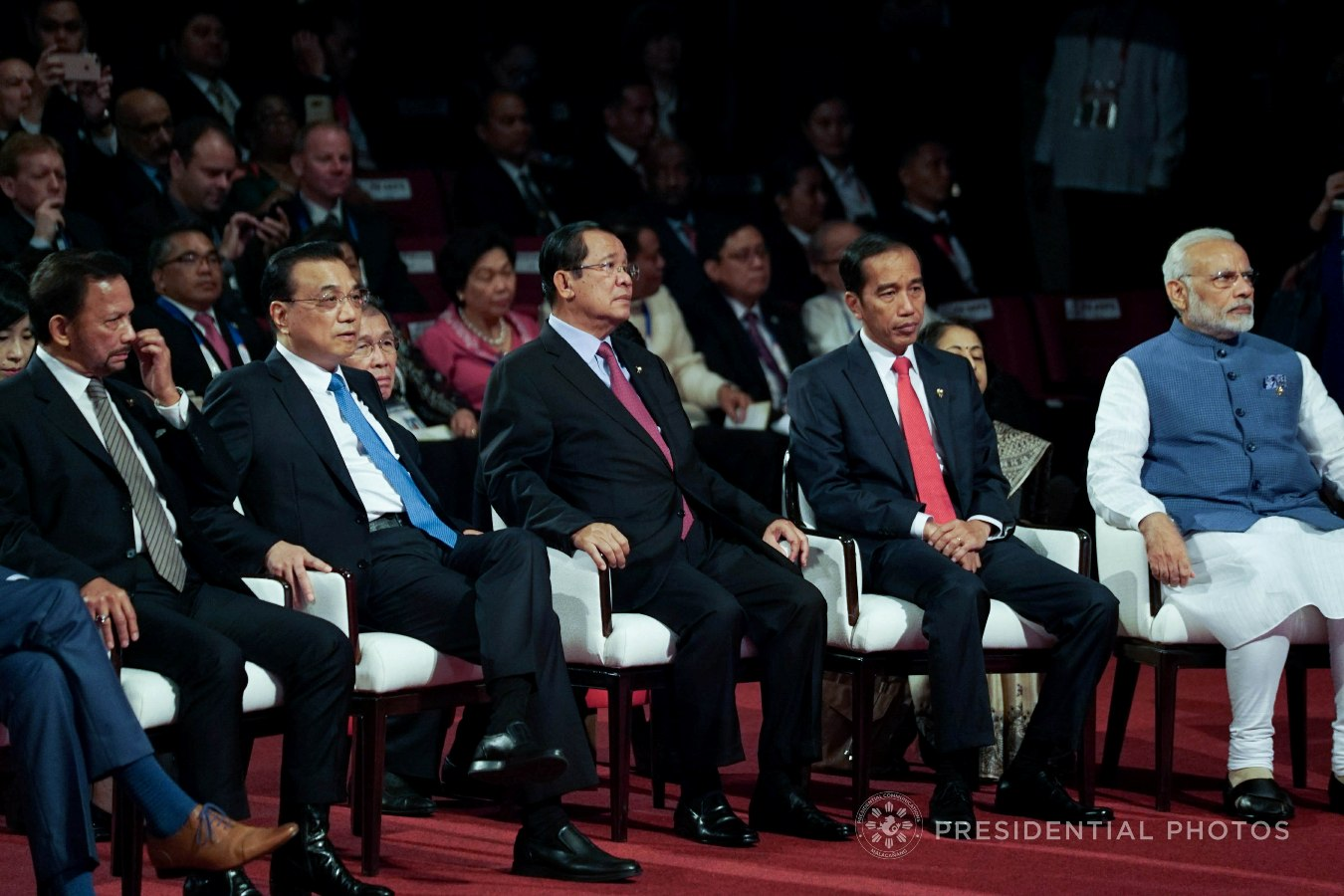
Jokowi with Hassanal Bolkiah, Li Keqiang, Hun Sen, and Narendra Modi during the 31st ASEAN Summit

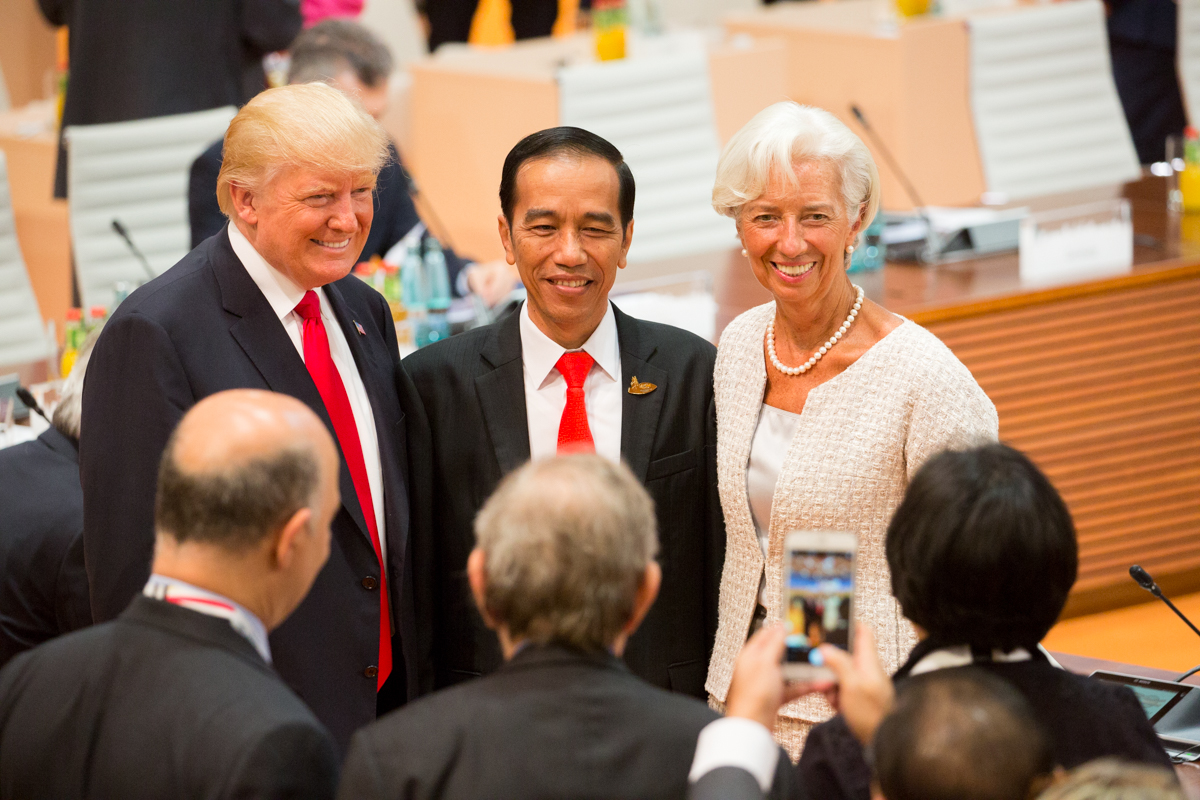
Jokowi with US President Donald Trump and IMF Chairman Christine Lagarde in the Hamburg G20 summit

#	Dates	Country	Locations	Details
17	25–27 February	Australia	Sydney	Jokowi met with PM Malcolm Turnbull and conducted bilateral talks on trade.
18	28–30 April	Philippines	Manila; Davao City	Jokowi attended the ASEAN Summit and conducted bilateral talks with Filipino president Rodrigo Duterte, in addition to inaugurating a new sea route between Davao-General Santos-Bitung.
18	30 April–1 May	Hong Kong		Jokowi visited Hong Kong and met with Indonesians workers there, before meeting Chief Executive Leung Chun-Ying and business leaders.
19	14–15 May	China	Beijing	Jokowi attended the first Belt and Road Forum and signed a five-year comprehensive Indonesia-China strategic partnership with Xi Jinping.
20	21 May	Saudi Arabia	Riyadh	Jokowi attended the Arab Islamic American Summit.
21	5–6 July	Turkey	Ankara	Jokowi met with Turkish president Recep Tayyip Erdoğan and discussed economic, industrial and counter-terrorism cooperation.
21	6–9 July	Germany	Hamburg	Jokowi attended the 2017 G20 Hamburg summit, where he conducted talks with US president Donald Trump among others.
22	6–7 September	Singapore		Jokowi visited Singapore to commemorate 50 years of diplomatic relations between the two countries, and met Singaporean PM Lee Hsien Long.
23	10–12 November	Vietnam	Đà Nẵng	Jokowi attended the APEC Vietnam 2017 summit.
23	12–16 November	Philippines	Manila	Jokowi attended the ASEAN summit.
24	22 November	Malaysia	Kuching	Jokowi attended an annual meeting with Malaysian PM Najib Razak.
25	13–14 December	Turkey	Istanbul	Jokowi attended the special OIC summit regarding American recognition of Jerusalem as the Israeli capital, and condemned Trump's decision.

== 2018 ==
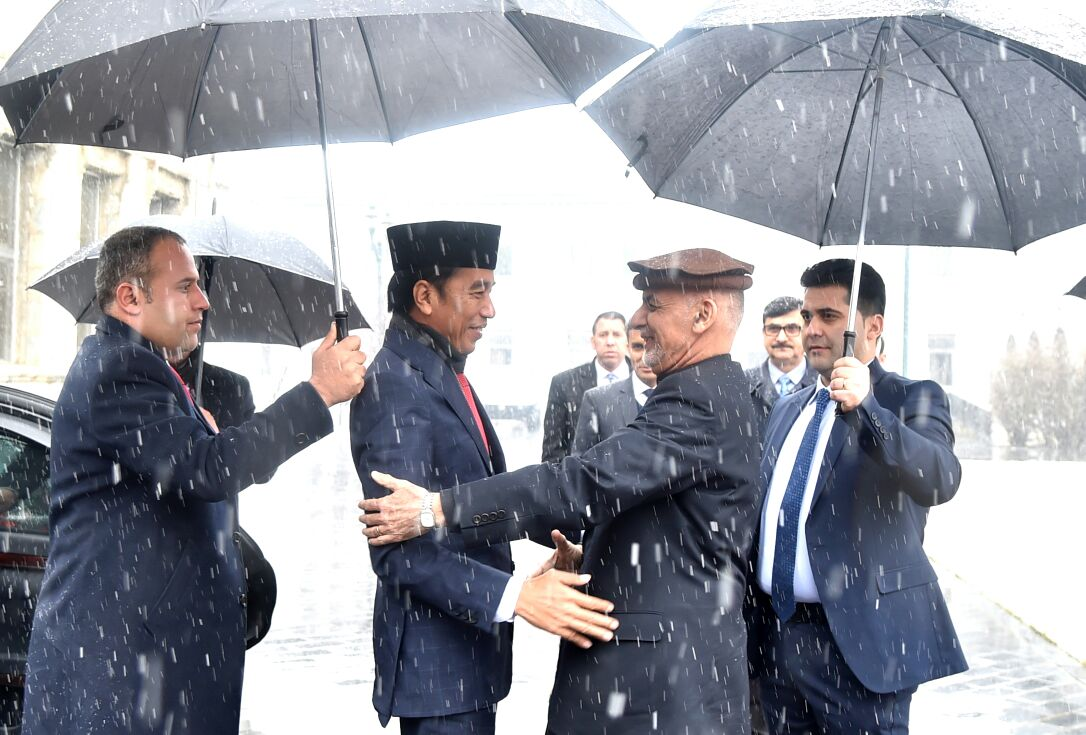
Jokowi with Afghan President Ashraf Ghani

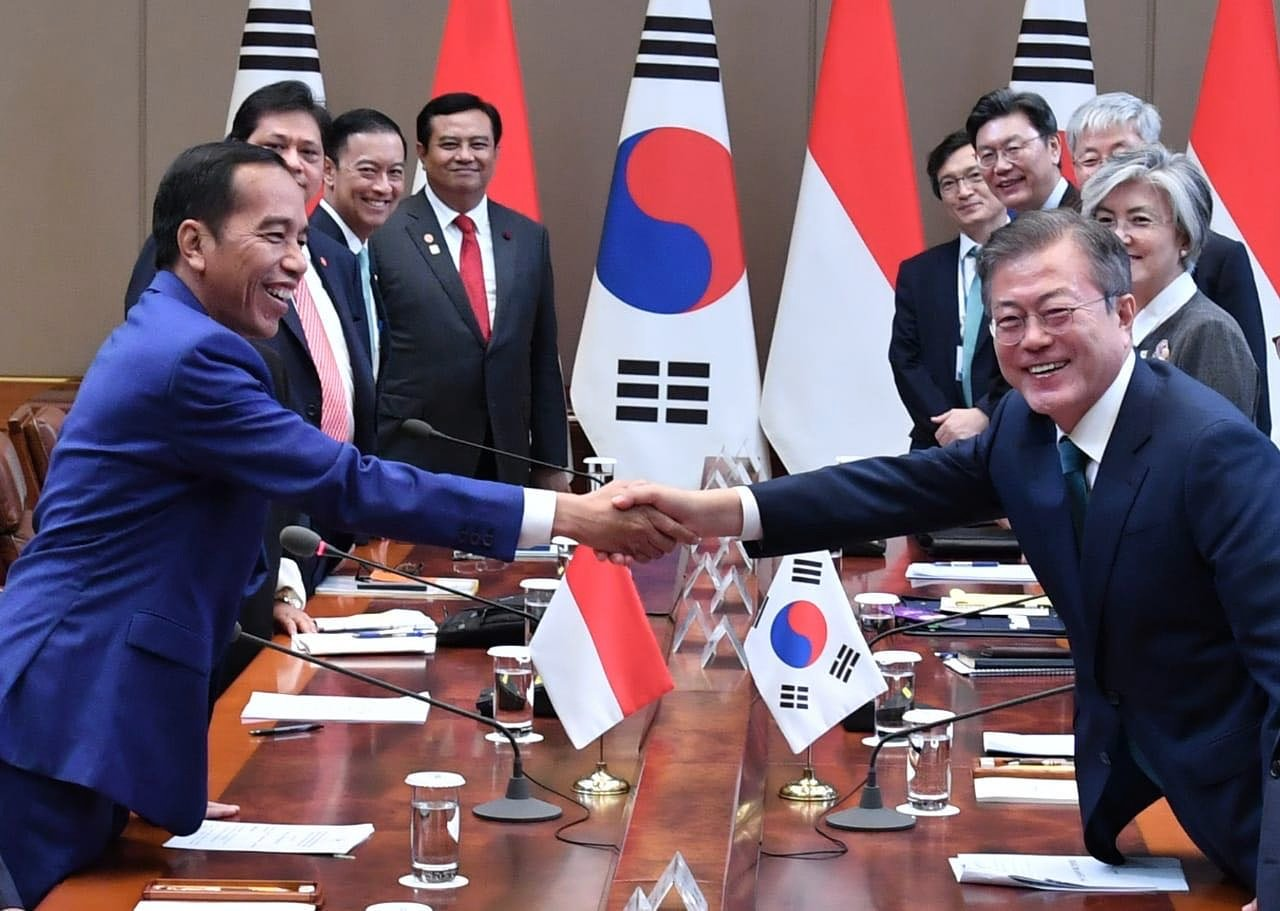
Jokowi with South Korean President Moon Jae-in

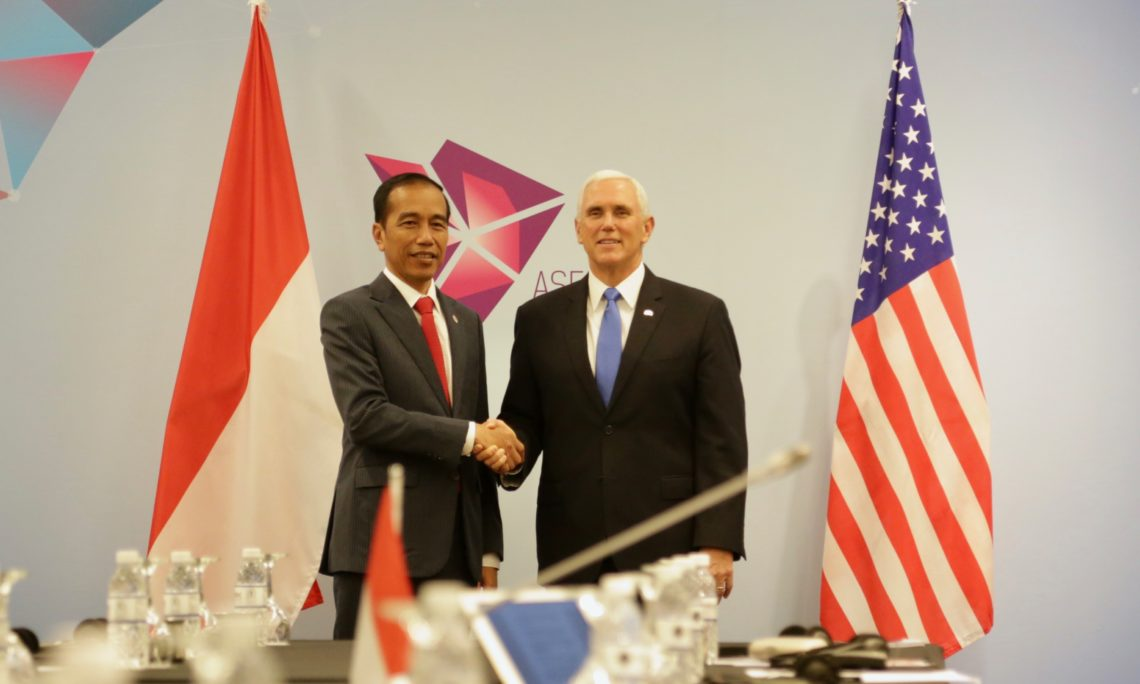
Jokowi with US Vice President Mike Pence

#	Dates	Country	Locations	Details
26	24–25 January	Sri Lanka	Colombo	Jokowi met with Sri Lankan president Maithripala Sirisena and discussed trade and economic affairs.
26	25–26 January	India	New Delhi	Jokowi attended the ASEAN-India summit and held bilateral talks with Indian PM Narendra Modi on trade. Jokowi left New Delhi after meeting Vietnamese PM Nguyễn Xuân Phúc.
26	26–27 January	Pakistan	Islamabad	Jokowi visited the National Assembly of Pakistan and met president Mamnoon Hussain as well as PM Shahid Khaqan Abbasi.
26	27–29 January	Bangladesh	Dhaka; Cox's Bazar	Jokowi met Bangladeshi PM Sheikh Hasina for bilateral talks and visited Rohingya refugee camps in Cox's Bazar.
26	29 January	Afghanistan	Kabul	Jokowi visited Afghanistan for six hours, meeting president Ashraf Ghani and conducted bilateral talks, stating that Indonesia will help in peacebuilding and reconciliation in Afghanistan.
27	15–18 March	Australia	Sydney	Jokowi attended the ASEAN-Australia forum and engaged in bilateral talks with Australian PM Malcolm Turnbull.
27	18–20 March	New Zealand	Wellington	Jokowi conducted bilateral talks and commemorated the 60th anniversary of Indonesia-New Zealand relations.
28	27–28 April	Singapore		Jokowi attended the 32nd ASEAN Summit and conducted bilateral talks with other leaders, such as Singaporean PM Lee Hsien Long and Burmese president Win Myint.
29	9–11 September	South Korea	Seoul	Jokowi met South Korean business leaders and conducted bilateral talks with president Moon Jae-in.
29	11–12 September	Vietnam	Hanoi	Jokowi conducted bilateral talks with Vietnamese PM Nguyễn Xuân Phúc before attending the World Economic Forum on ASEAN.
30	13–15 November	Singapore		Jokowi attended the 33rd ASEAN Summit and held bilateral meetings with Russian president Vladimir Putin, Chilean president Michelle Bachelet and Japanese PM Shinzo Abe.
30	15–18 November	Papua New Guinea	Port Moresby	Jokowi attended the APEC Papua New Guinea 2018 summit.

== 2019 ==
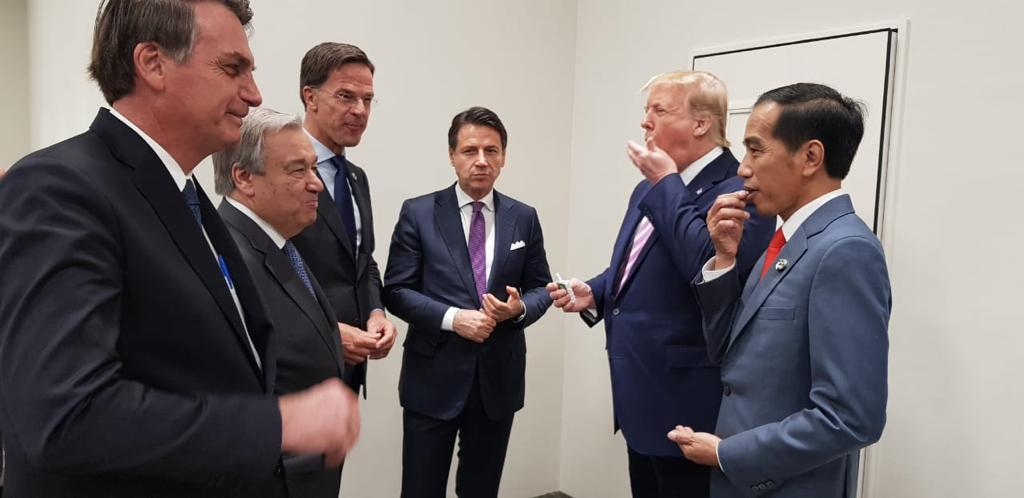
Jokowi with leaders eating Tic-tac candies given by Donald Trump at the G20 Osaka Summit

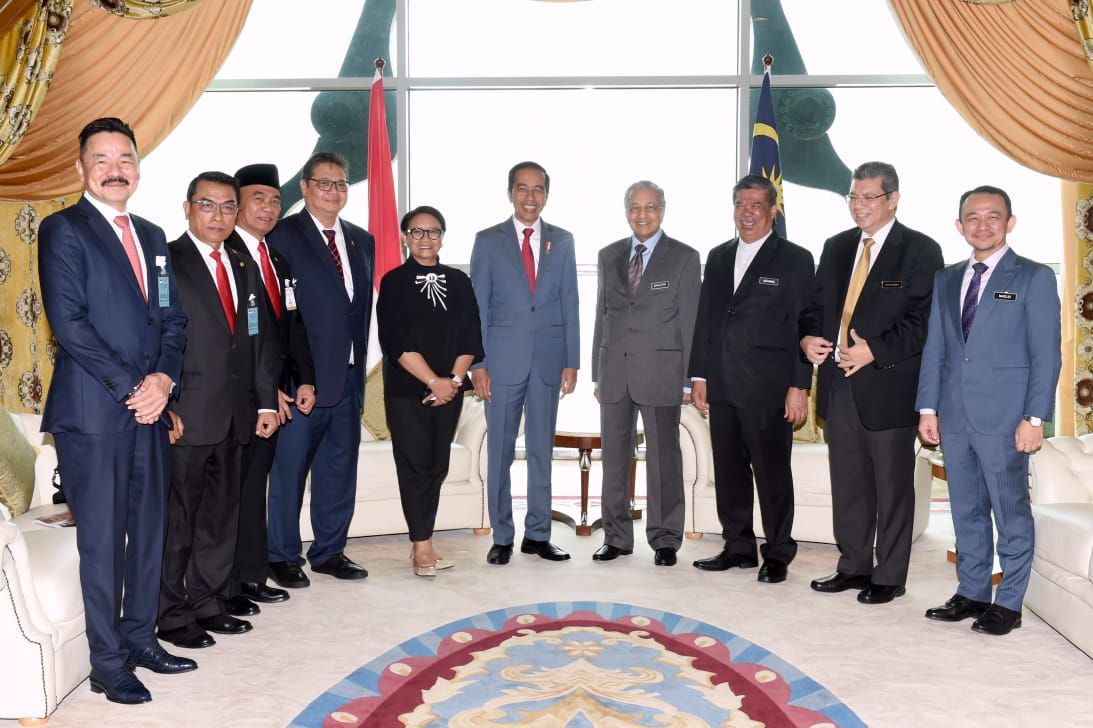
Jokowi with Mahathir Mohamad, accompanied by several government ministers from both countries

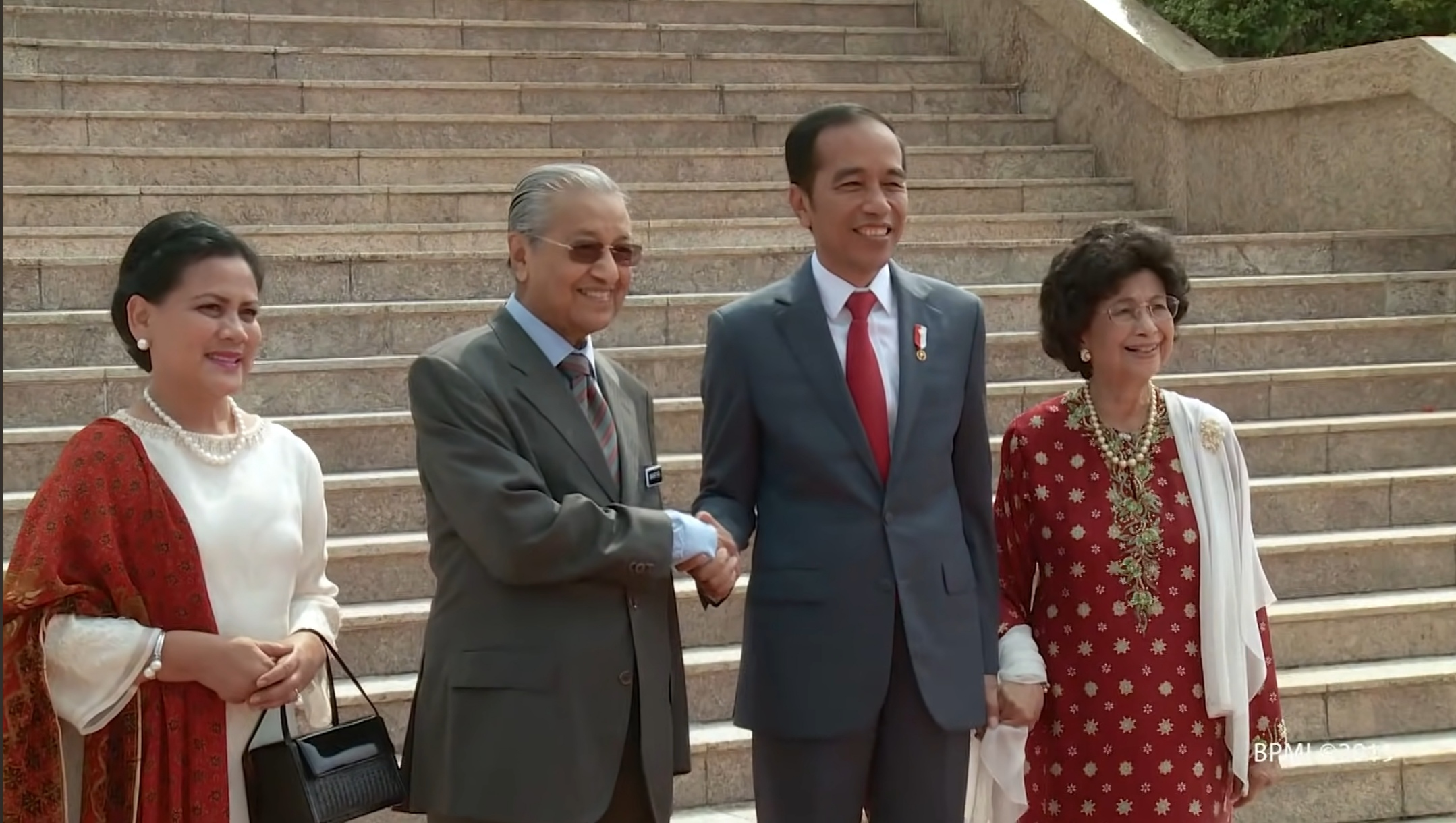
Joko Widodo and his wife, Iriana, meeting with Malaysian Prime Minister Mahathir Mohamad and his wife, Siti Hasmah Mohamad Ali

#	Dates	Country	Locations	Details
31	14–15 April	Saudi Arabia	Riyadh; Mecca	Jokowi attended an invitation by King Salman, meeting him and crown prince Mohammad Bin Salman in Riyadh before going on an umrah at Mecca.
32	28–29 June	Japan	Osaka	Jokowi attended the 2019 G20 Osaka summit.
33	8–9 August	Malaysia	Kuala Lumpur	Jokowi held bilateral talks with Malaysian Prime Minister Mahathir Mohamad.
33	9 August	Singapore		Jokowi attended Singapore's national day celebrations.
34	9 October	Singapore		Jokowi attended annual meetings with Singaporean Prime Minister Lee Hsien Loong.
35	2–4 November	Thailand	Bangkok	Jokowi attended the ASEAN Summit and the East Asia Summit. First international trip following his second inauguration.

== 2020 ==
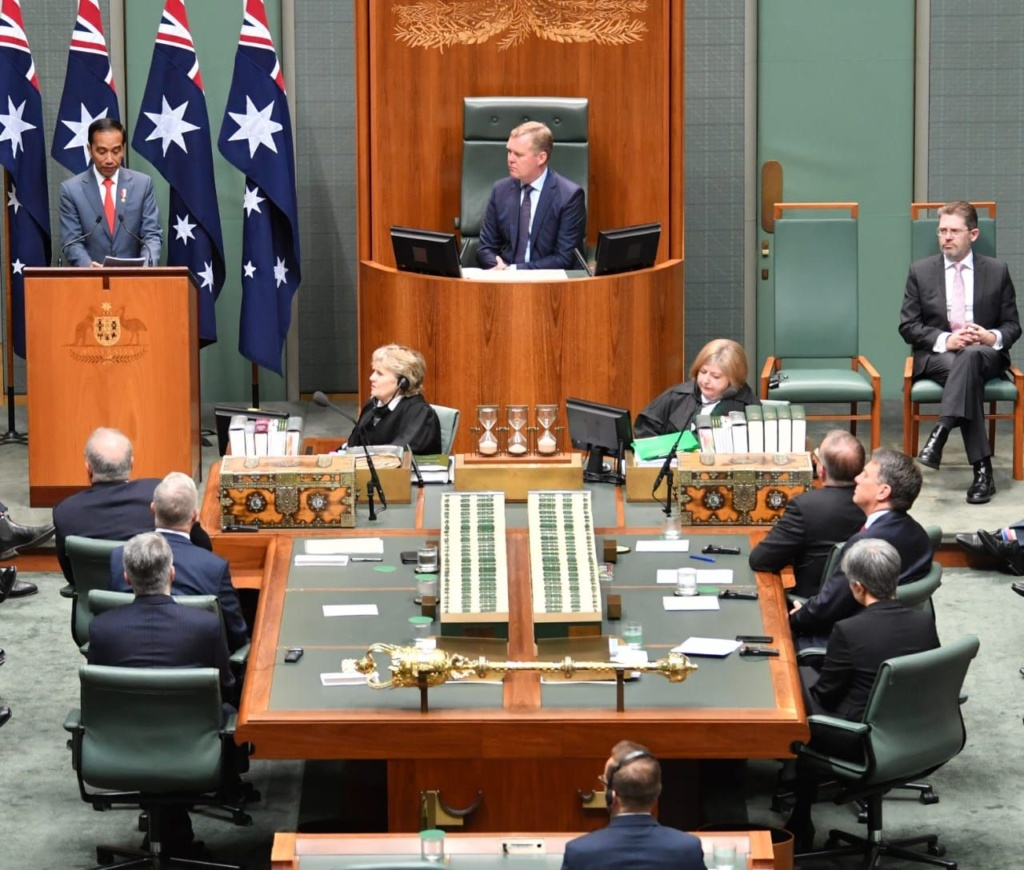
Jokowi delivering an address in the Parliament of Australia.

#	Dates	Country	Locations	Details
36	12–13 January	United Arab Emirates	Abu Dhabi	Jokowi attended an invitation by Abu Dhabi Crown Prince Mohammed bin Zayed Al Nahyan and held bilateral talks.
37	8–10 February	Australia	Canberra	Jokowi met with Australian Governor-General David Hurley and PM Scott Morrison to hold bilateral talks. He also delivered a speech in the House of Representatives

== 2021 ==
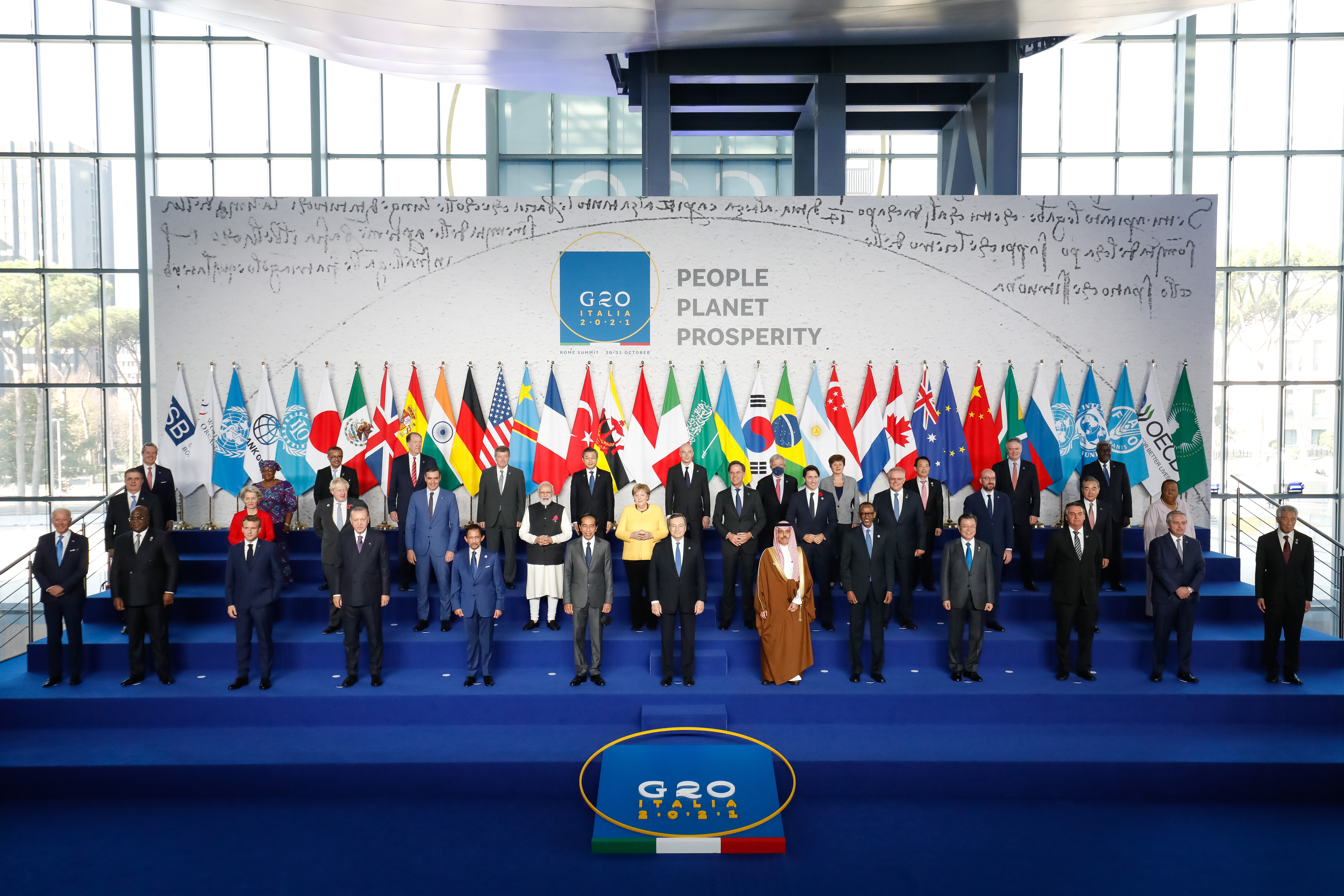
Joko Widodo (between Hassanal Bolkiah and Mario Draghi) at the 2021 G20 Rome summit

#	Dates	Country	Locations	Details
38	30–31 October	Italy	Rome	Jokowi attended the 2021 G20 Rome summit.
38	1–2 November	United Kingdom	Glasgow	Jokowi attended the 2021 United Nations Climate Change Conference.
38	3–4 November	United Arab Emirates	Abu Dhabi; Dubai	Jokowi met Emirati business leaders and held bilateral talks with Crown Prince Mohammed bin Zayed Al Nahyan. He also visited the Indonesian Pavilion at the Expo 2020.

== 2022 ==
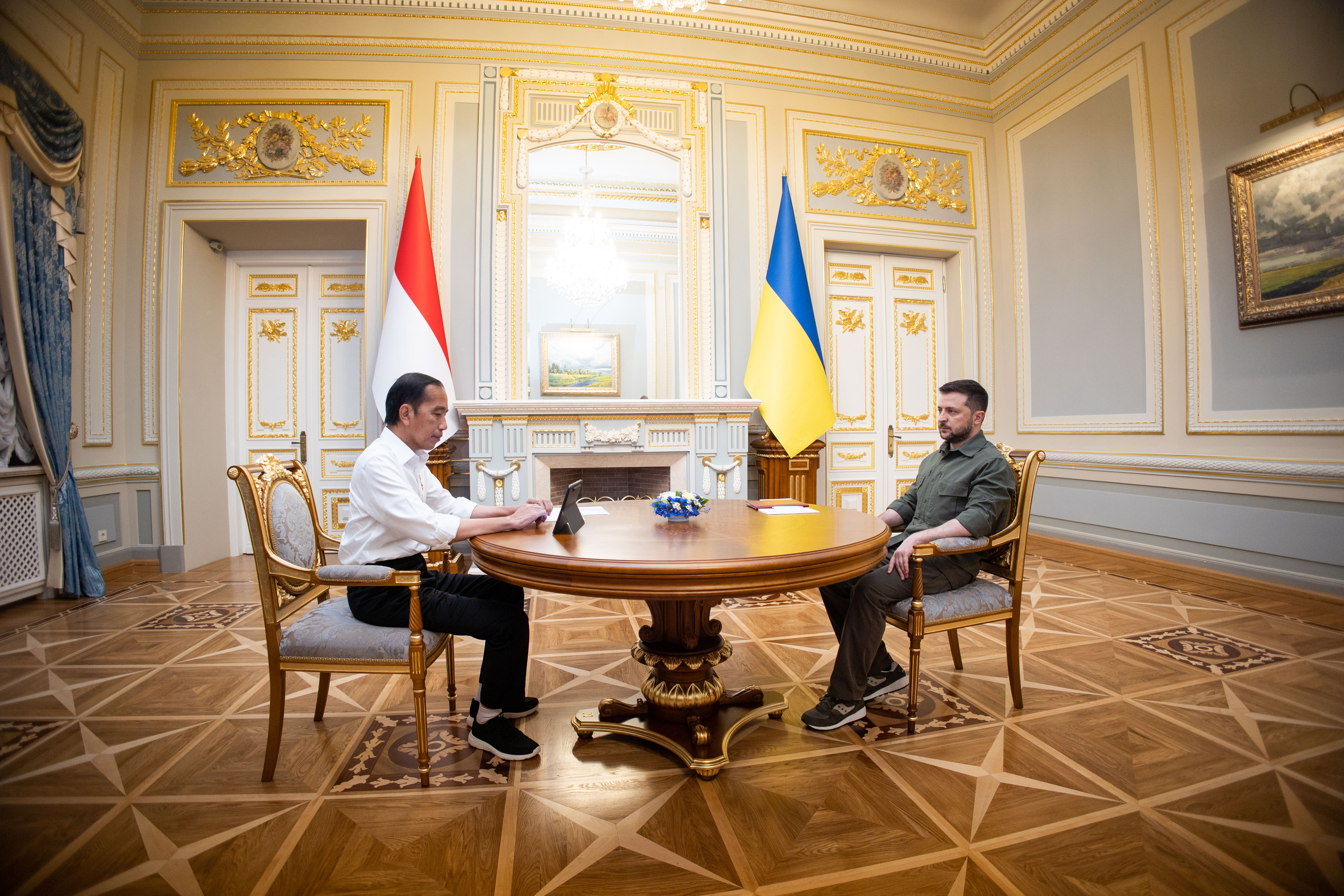
Jokowi meeting Volodymyr Zelenskyy at Mariinskyi Palace, Kyiv

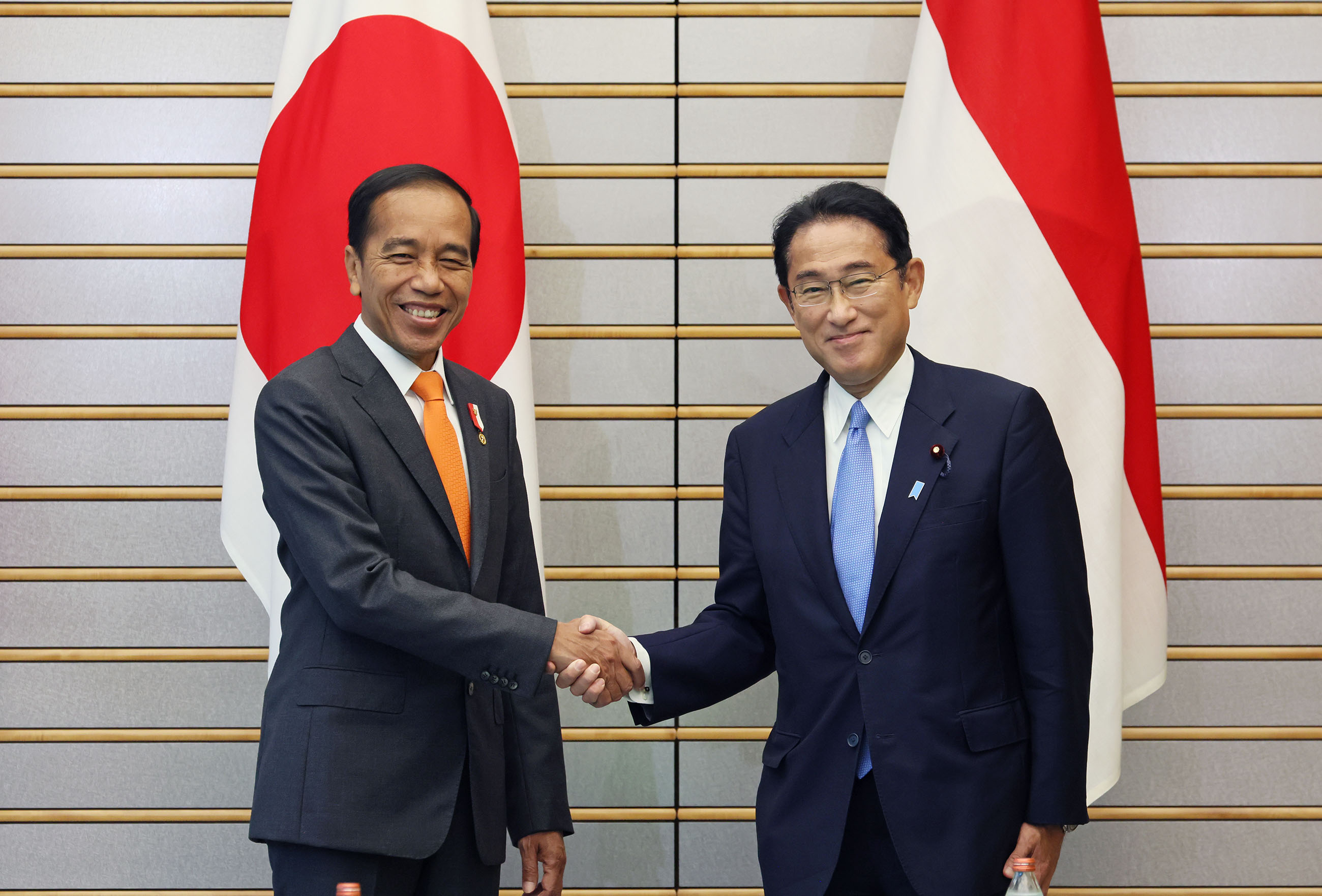
Jokowi meeting Fumio Kishida at Prime Minister of Japan Office, Tokyo

#	Dates	Country	Locations	Details
39	10 May	Netherlands	Amsterdam	Jokowi made a transit in Amsterdam en route to Washington, D. C.
39	10–14 May	United States	Washington, D. C. Boca Chica, Texas	Jokowi participated in a series of meetings of the ASEAN-US Special Summit (AUSS) and also met the CEO of Tesla, Inc., Elon Musk.
39	15 May	United Arab Emirates	Abu Dhabi	Jokowi expressed condolences to the UAE government, people, and the family of the late President Sheikh Khalifa bin Zayed Al Nahyan.
40	27–28 June	Germany	Munich; Schloss Elmau	Jokowi attended the 48th G7 summit as Indonesia assumed the G20 Presidency in 2022 and conducted bilateral talks with German Chancellor Olaf Scholz, French President Emmanuel Macron, Japanese PM Fumio Kishida, British PM Boris Johnson, Indian PM Narendra Modi, Canadian PM Justin Trudeau, European Commission President Ursula von der Leyen, and European Council President Charles Michel.
40	28 June	Poland	Rzeszów; Przemyśl	Jokowi made a transit in Rzeszów and Przemyśl en route to Kyiv by train.
40	29 June	Ukraine	Kyiv; Irpin	Jokowi conducted bilateral talks with President Volodymyr Zelenskyy at Mariinskyi Palace and also toured several locations, including a destroyed apartment complex in Irpin and Kyiv's Center of Endocrinology. This is his second presidential trip to a war zone after his visit to Afghanistan in 2018.
40	30 June	Poland	Rzeszów; Przemyśl	Jokowi returned to Poland after a 12-hour train journey from Kyiv.
40	30 June	Russia	Moscow	Jokowi conducted bilateral talks with President Vladimir Putin.
40	1 July	United Arab Emirates	Abu Dhabi	Jokowi traveled to the UAE to discuss investment cooperation.
41	26 July	China	Beijing	Jokowi conducted bilateral talks with Premier Li Keqiang and President Xi Jinping to extend the Global Maritime Fulcrum-Belt and Road Initiative (GMF-BRI) cooperation.
41	27 July	Japan	Tokyo	Jokowi conducted bilateral talks with PM Fumio Kishida and met with Emperor Naruhito.
41	28 July	South Korea	Seoul	Jokowi met South Korean business leaders and conducted bilateral talks with President Yoon Suk-yeol.
42	10–13 November	Cambodia	Phnom Penh	Jokowi attended the ASEAN Summit and the East Asia Summit.
43	18–19 November	Thailand	Bangkok	Jokowi attended the APEC Thailand 2022 summit.
44	13–14 December	Belgium	Brussels	Jokowi attended the ASEAN-EU Commemorative Summit marks 45 years of diplomatic relations. Jokowi also conducted bilateral talks with Czech PM Petr Fiala and met King Philippe of Belgium in Laeken Palace.

== 2023 ==
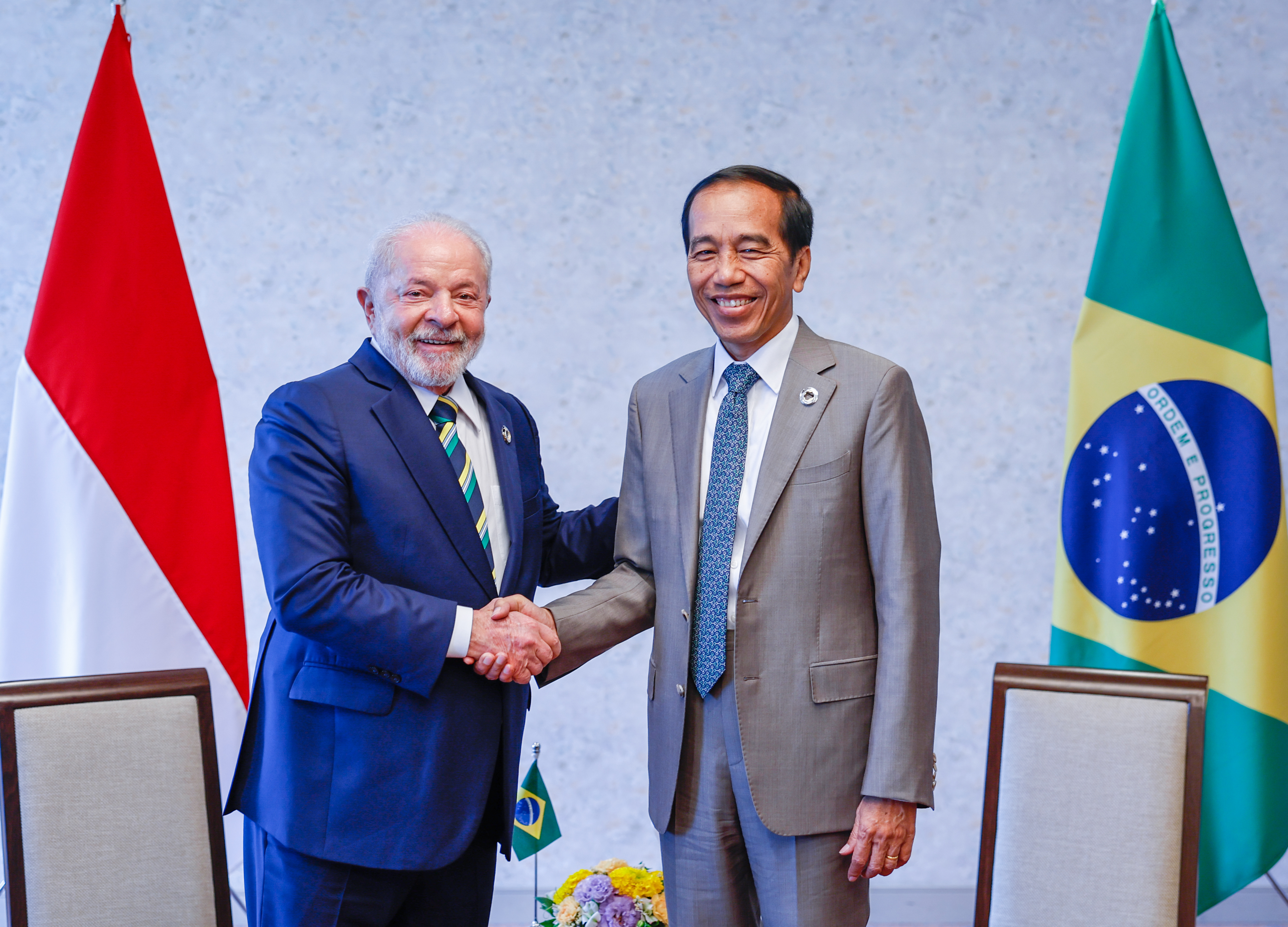
Jokowi with Brazilian President Luiz Inácio da Silva in Hiroshima

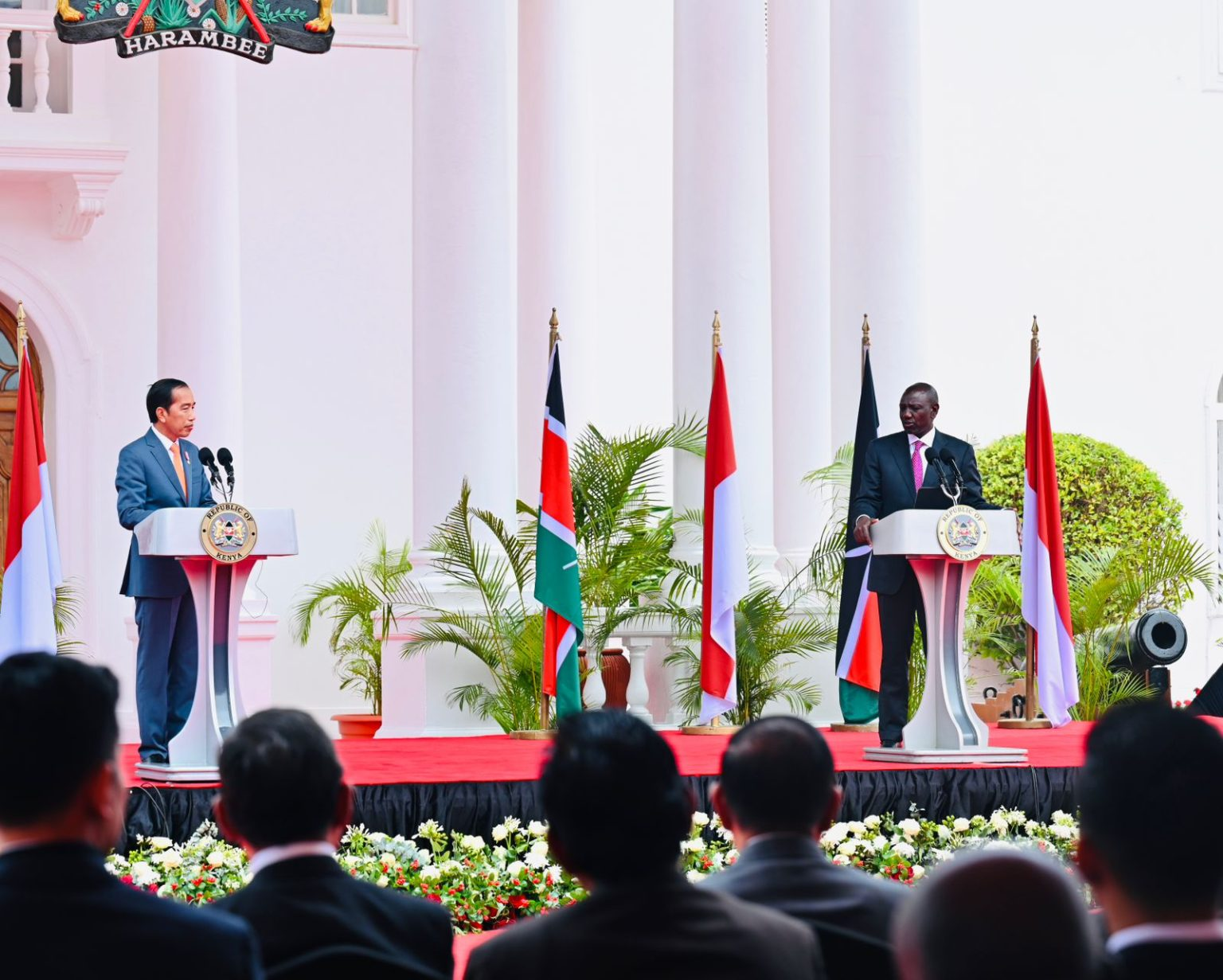
Jokowi made his first visit in Africa to Kenya

#	Dates	Country	Locations	Details
45	16 March	Singapore		Jokowi attended annual Leaders' Retreat with Singaporean Prime Minister Lee Hsien Loong.
46	15–18 April	Germany	Hanover	Jokowi attended and opened the 2023 Hannover Messe along with German Chancellor Olaf Scholz, while meeting several European executives regarding investments in Indonesia.
47	19–21 May	Japan	Hiroshima	Jokowi attended the 49th G7 summit as Indonesia assumed ASEAN Presidency in 2023 and conducted bilateral talks with Japanese PM Fumio Kishida, British PM Rishi Sunak, Canadian PM Justin Trudeau, Brazilian President Luiz Inácio Lula da Silva, Cook Islands PM Mark Brown, South Korean President Yoon Suk-yeol, French President Emmanuel Macron, Ukrainian President Volodymyr Zelenskyy, and European Commission President Ursula von der Leyen.
48	7 June	Singapore		Jokowi attended Ecosperity Week 2023 to promote investments in Nusantara and met with Singaporean Prime Minister Lee Hsien Loong.
48	7–8 June	Malaysia	Kuala Lumpur; Putrajaya	Jokowi held bilateral talks with Malaysian Prime Minister Anwar Ibrahim. He also met Yang di-Pertuan Agong Al-Sultan Abdullah and visited Chow Kit Market.
49	3–4 July	Australia	Sydney	Jokowi met with Australian Governor-General David Hurley and PM Anthony Albanese to hold the annual Leaders' Meeting.
49	5 July	Papua New Guinea	Port Moresby	Jokowi met with Papua New Guinean Governor-General Sir Bob Dadae and PM James Marape to hold bilateral talks and attended the first Indonesia–Papua New Guinea business forum.
50	27–28 July	China	Chengdu	Jokowi held bilateral talks with President Xi Jinping. He also met Chinese business leaders and attended the opening ceremony of the 2021 Summer World University Games.
51	20–21 August	Kenya	Nairobi	Jokowi made his first presidential visit to Africa and held bilateral talks with President William Ruto.
51	21–22 August	Tanzania	Dar es Salaam	Jokowi held bilateral talks with President Samia Suluhu Hassan and met Tanzanian business leaders.
51	22–23 August	Mozambique	Maputo	Jokowi held bilateral talks with President Filipe Nyusi.
51	23–24 August	South Africa	Johannesburg	Jokowi attended the 15th BRICS summit and conducted bilateral talks with the Prime Minister of the Democratic Republic of the Congo Jean-Michel Sama Lukonde.
52	8–10 September	India	New Delhi	Jokowi attended the 2023 G20 New Delhi summit, chaired the 1st MIKTA Leaders' Gathering, conducted bilateral talks with Dutch PM Mark Rutte, Emirati President Mohammed bin Zayed Al Nahyan, French President Emmanuel Macron, and Italian PM Giorgia Meloni.
53	17–18 October	China	Beijing	Jokowi attended the 2023 Belt and Road Forum, conducted bilateral talks with President Xi Jinping, Premier Li Qiang, and Sri Lankan President Ranil Wickremesinghe.
53	18–20 October	Saudi Arabia	Riyadh	Jokowi conducted bilateral talks with Prime Minister Mohammed bin Salman and attended the ASEAN-GCC summit.
54	11–12 November	Saudi Arabia	Riyadh	Jokowi conducted bilateral talks with King Abdullah II of Jordan, Palestinian President Mahmoud Abbas, and attended the OIC Extraordinary Meeting.
54	12–17 November	United States	Washington, D.C. San Francisco	Jokowi held bilateral talks with President Joe Biden at the White House. Before heading to the White House, Jokowi delivered a public lecture at Georgetown University. In San Francisco, Jokowi conducted trilateral talks with Papuan New Guinean PM James Marape and Fijian PM Sitiveni Rabuka. He also conducted bilateral talk with Peruvian President Dina Boluarte and attended the APEC United States 2023 Summit.
54	17 November	Japan	Tokyo	Jokowi made transit in Tokyo Haneda Airport en route to Jakarta by airplane after a 12-hour journey from San Francisco.
55	16–19 December	Japan	Tokyo	Jokowi attended the ASEAN-Japan summit.

== 2024 ==
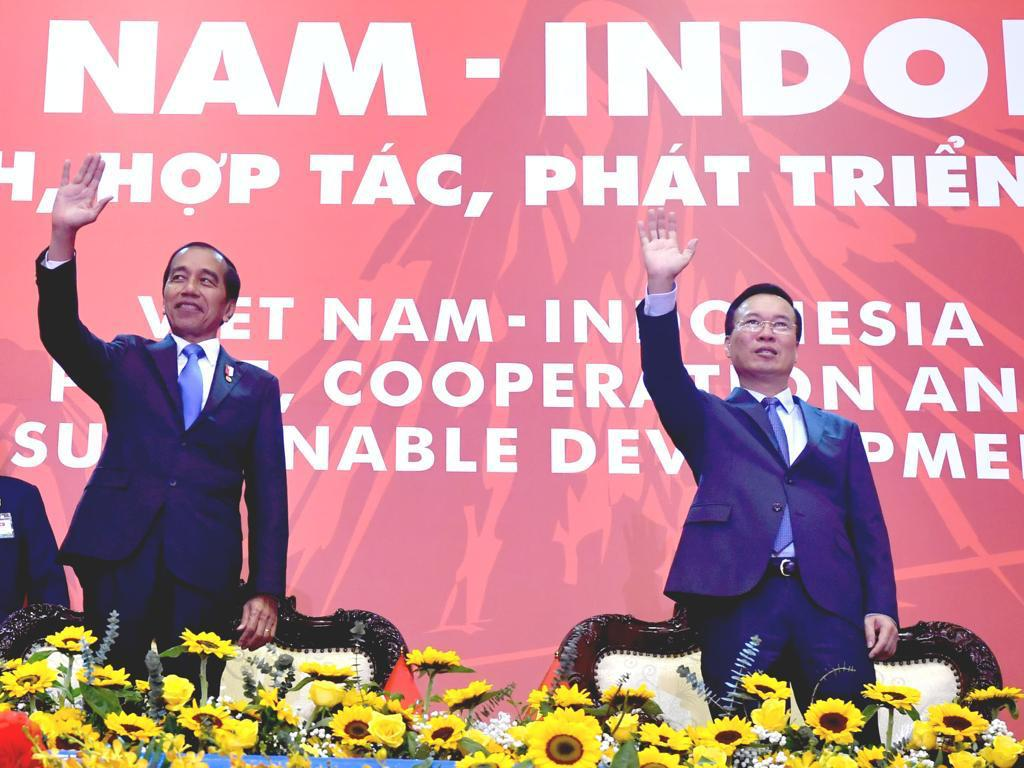
Jokowi with Vietnamese President Võ Văn Thưởng in Hà Nội

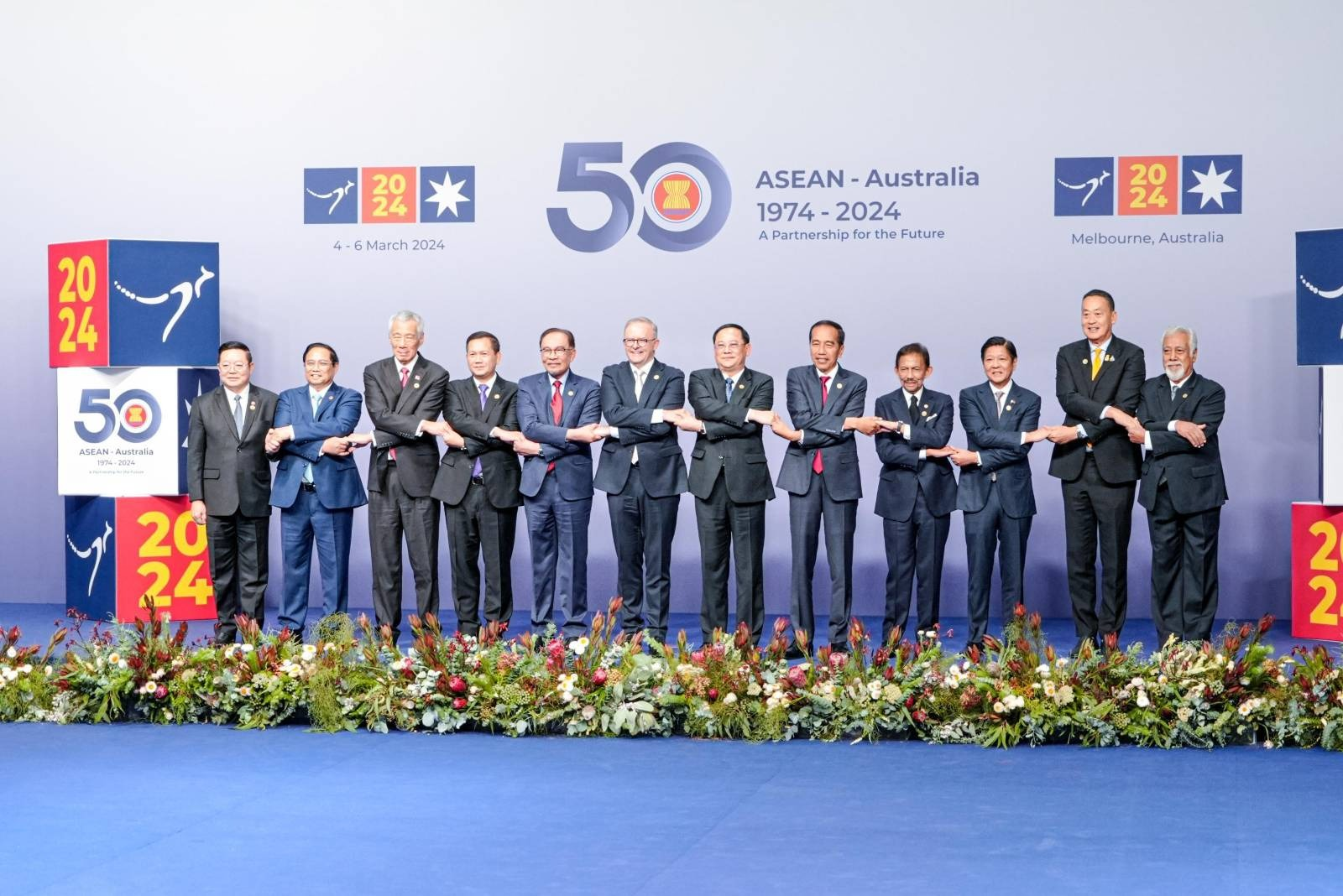
Joko Widodo at the ASEAN-Australia Special Summit in Melbourne

#	Dates	Country	Locations	Details
56	9–11 January	Philippines	Manila	Jokowi held bilateral talks with President Bongbong Marcos at the Malacañang Palace.
56	11–13 January	Vietnam	Hanoi; Haiphong	Jokowi held bilateral talks with President Võ Văn Thưởng and the Chairman of National Assembly of Vietnam Vương Đình Huệ. He also conducted a bilateral meeting with Phạm Minh Chính, PM of Vietnam. The next day, Jokowi attended a High-Level Business Dialogue alongside Chính. He invited Vietnamese entrepreneurs to invest in Indonesia's new capital city Nusantara. The president also visited VinFast EV manufacturing complex in Hai Phong and praised the company's plans to invest $1.2 billion in the EV sector.
56	13–14 January	Brunei	Bandar Seri Begawan	Jokowi held a meeting with a number of consortiums of investors of Brunei. He also attended the wedding reception of Prince Mateen, son of Sultan Hassanal Bolkiah.
57	4–6 March	Australia	Melbourne	Jokowi attended the ASEAN-Australia Special Summit marking 50 years of diplomatic relations. Jokowi also conducted bilateral talks with Cambodian PM Hun Manet, Australian PM Anthony Albanese and New Zealand PM Christopher Luxon.
58	17 July	United Arab Emirates	Abu Dhabi	Jokowi was directly greeted by Emirati President Mohamed bin Zayed Al Nahyan at the Presidential Airport in Abu Dhabi. The two leaders discussed a raft of agreements including co-operation on infrastructure development, artificial intelligence and other environmental issues. They also had a discussion to accelerate the Comprehensive Economic Partnership Agreement (CEPA) which was signed between both nations in July 2022. Jokowi also performed a prayer in President Joko Widodo Mosque, a mosque named after him in Abu Dhabi. He also received the Order of Zayed, the highest civilian honor that the UAE leader confers to world leaders and heads of state.

== Multilateral meetings ==
The following multilateral meetings were scheduled to take place during Jokowi's 2014–2019 term in office.

Group	Year					
Group	2014	2015	2016	2017	2018	2019
APEC	10–12 November (China) Beijing	18–19 November (Philippines) Manila	19–20 November (Peru) Lima	10–11 November (Vietnam) Đà Nẵng	17–18 November (Papua New Guinea) Port Moresby	
EAS (ASEAN)	12–13 November (Myanmar) Naypyidaw	21–22 November (Malaysia) Kuala Lumpur	6–8 September (Laos) Vientiane	13–14 November (Philippines) Pasay	14–15 November (Singapore) Central Area	
G20	15–16 November (Australia) Brisbane	15–16 November (Turkey) Antalya	4–5 September (China) Hangzhou	7–8 July (Germany) Hamburg	30 November – 1 December (Argentina) Buenos Aires	28–29 June (Japan) Osaka
Others	None	None	None	None	None	None
██ = Future event ██ = Did / will not attend ██ = Event cancelled

The following multilateral meetings were scheduled to take place during Jokowi's 2019–2024 term in office.

Group	2019	2020	2021	2022	2023	2024
APEC	16–17 November (Chile) Santiago	20 November (virtual) (Malaysia) Kuala Lumpur	12 November (virtual) (New Zealand) Auckland	18–19 November (Thailand) Bangkok	15–17 November (United States) San Francisco	
EAS (ASEAN)	4 November (Thailand) Bangkok	26 June & 11 November (virtual) (Vietnam) Hanoi	26–27 October (virtual) (Brunei) Bandar Seri Begawan	12–13 November (Cambodia) Phnom Penh	6–7 September (Indonesia) Jakarta	10–11 October (Laos) Vientiane
G20		21–22 November (virtual) (Saudi Arabia) Riyadh	30–31 October (Italy) Rome	15–16 November (Indonesia) Bali	9–10 September (India) New Delhi	
Others	None	None	None	G7 Summit; 26–28 June (Germany) Krün	G7 Summit; 19–21 May (Japan) Hiroshima; BRICS Summit; 22–24 August (South Africa) Johannesburg	World Water Forum; 18–25 May (Indonesia) Bali
██ = Future event ██ = Did / will not attend ██ = Event cancelled
