= APEC Papua New Guinea 2018 =

International economic delegation

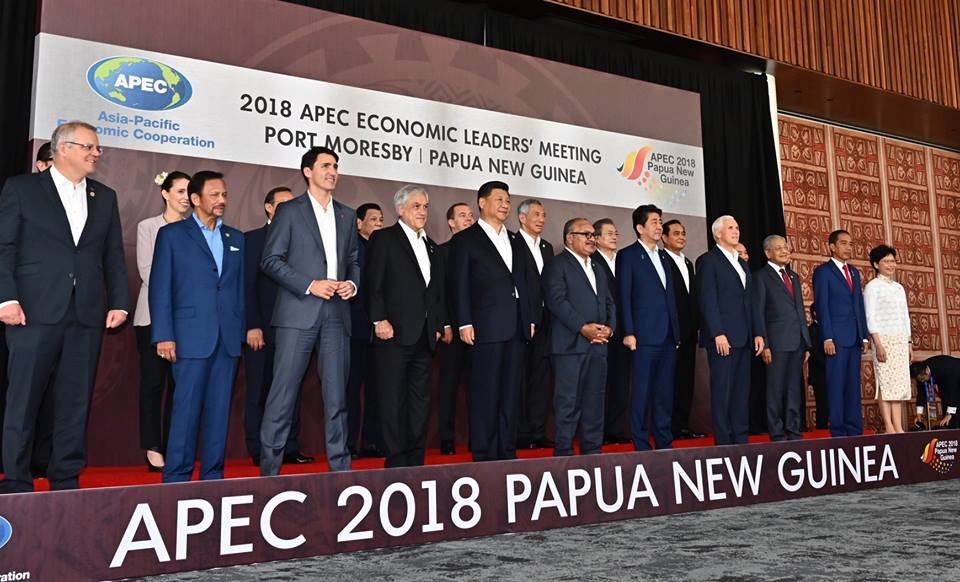
- Host country: Papua New Guinea
- Date: 17–18 November 2018
- Venues: Port Moresby
- Follows: APEC Vietnam 2017
- Precedes: ~~APEC Chile 2019~~ (cancelled); APEC Malaysia 2020
- Website: apec2018png.org (archived)

APEC Papua New Guinea 2018 was the year-long hosting of Asia-Pacific Economic Cooperation (APEC) meetings in Papua New Guinea.

It was the first time Papua New Guinea hosted the APEC meetings. Australia provided a quarter to a third of the cost to host the meetings and also helped with logistics and security (G4S). Three cruise ships were chartered through an Australian company to cater to some 10,000 delegates and guests.

Many of the attendees and delegations had previously attended the 2018 East Asia Summit held from 11 to 15 November in Singapore, hosted by the Chairperson Lee Hsien Loong, the prime minister of Singapore. Thereafter, many of the state leaders, including Prime Minister Lee of Singapore, flew from Singapore to Papua New Guinea.

== Events ==
=== Economic Leaders' Meeting ===
==== Attendees ====
This was the first APEC meeting for Chilean president Sebastián Piñera, Malaysian prime minister Mahathir Mohamad, and Australian prime minister Scott Morrison, since their inaugurations and appointments on 11 March 2018, 10 May 2018, and 24 August 2018, respectively; Piñera and Mahathir had previously attended multiple APEC meetings in their first term as president and prime minister, respectively. It was also the last APEC meeting for the host Papua New Guinea prime minister Peter O'Neill, who stepped down on 29 May 2019. Additionally, this was the last APEC meeting for Malaysian prime minister Mohamad and Japanese prime minister Shinzo Abe, following their respective resignations in 2020 as the planned 2019 summit was cancelled due to the protests in Chile. While Nguyễn Xuân Phúc attended for the last time as the prime minister of Vietnam before he was elected president in 2021.

Five presidents did not attend the summit – Mexican president Enrique Peña Nieto, Peruvian president Martín Vizcarra, Russian president Vladimir Putin, United States president Donald Trump, and Vietnamese president Nguyễn Phú Trọng. Peña Nieto was represented by Mexican Under Secretary of Foreign Trade Juan Carlos Baker, while Vizcarra sent Peruvian foreign minister Nestor Popolizio in his place. Putin was represented by former Russian president, now Prime Minister Dmitry Medvedev, while Trump sent Vice President Mike Pence in his place. Nguyễn Phú Trọng was represented by Prime Minister Nguyễn Xuân Phúc respectively.

Attendees at the 2018 APEC Economic Leaders' Meeting
Member economy	Name as used in APEC	Position	Name
Australia	Australia	Prime Minister	Scott Morrison
Brunei	Brunei Darussalam	Sultan	Hassanal Bolkiah
Canada	Canada	Prime Minister	Justin Trudeau
Chile	Chile	President	Sebastián Piñera
China	People's Republic of China	President (Note: The president of China is legally a ceremonial representative with no real power, but the general secretary of the Chinese Communist Party (de facto leader in one-party communist state) has always held this office since 1993 except for the months of transition.)	Xi Jinping
Hong Kong	Hong Kong, China	Chief Executive	Carrie Lam
Indonesia	Indonesia	President	Joko Widodo
Japan	Japan	Prime Minister	Shinzō Abe
South Korea	Republic of Korea	President	Moon Jae-in
Malaysia	Malaysia	Prime Minister	Mahathir Mohamad
Mexico*	Mexico	Under Secretary of Foreign Trade	Juan Carlos Baker
New Zealand	New Zealand	Prime Minister	Jacinda Ardern
Papua New Guinea	Papua New Guinea	Prime Minister	Peter O'Neill (host)
Peru*	Peru	Foreign Minister	Nestor Popolizio
Philippines	Philippines	President	Rodrigo Duterte
Russia*	Russia	Prime Minister	Dmitry Medvedev
Singapore	Singapore	Prime Minister	Lee Hsien Loong
Taiwan	Chinese Taipei	Special Representative of President	Morris Chang
Thailand	Thailand	Prime Minister	Prayut Chan-o-cha
United States*	The United States	Vice President	Mike Pence
Vietnam*	Viet Nam	Prime Minister	Nguyễn Xuân Phúc
(*) Mexican President Enrique Peña Nieto, Peruvian President Martín Vizcarra, Russian President Vladimir Putin, United States President Donald Trump, and Vietnamese President Nguyễn Phú Trọng did not attend the leaders summit. Representatives of each country were sent to attend on their behalf. (Note: The actual head of government of Vietnam is the Prime Minister. The President of Vietnam is legally the head of state, but the General Secretary of the Communist Party of Vietnam is the practical highest political leader in one-party communist state.)

==== Invited Attendees ====
Leaders and representatives of Pacific Island nations were invited by Papua New Guinea to attend the "APEC Leaders' Dialogue with Pacific Island Leaders" on 17 November.

Pacific Island Attendees at the 2018 APEC Economic Leaders' Meeting
Pacific Island attendee	Name	Position
Cook Islands	Henry Puna	Prime Minister
Fiji	Inoke Kubuabola	Minister for National Security and Defence
(France) French Polynesia	Tearii Alpha	Minister of Primary Resource Development, Land Use, Development and Mining
Kiribati	David Ateti Teaabo	Special envoy for President Taneti Mamau
Marshall Islands	Hilda Heine	President
Micronesia	Peter M. Christian	President
Nauru	Baron Waqa	President
Niue	Toke Talagi	Premier
Samoa	Tuilaepa Aiono Sailele Malielegaoi	Prime Minister
Solomon Islands	Rick Houenipwela	Prime Minister
Tonga	ʻAkilisi Pōhiva	Prime Minister
Tuvalu	Enele Sopoaga	Prime Minister
Vanuatu	Charlot Salwai	Prime Minister

=== Absence of declaration and aftermath ===
According to Reuters, "the leaders failed to agree on a communique at a summit in Papua New Guinea on Sunday for the first time in their history as deep divisions between the United States and China over trade and investment stymied cooperation." Also according to same article: "O’Neill said that as APEC host, he would release a Chairman’s Statement, though it was not clear when." O'Neill said that the talks broke down over language about the World Trade Organization while Reuters reported that the cause for the impasse was disagreement on portions of the draft communique relating to the WTO which mentioned opposing "unfair trade practices" and reforming the WTO, while another concerned sustainable development.

== Security ==
Much of the security for the meeting was provided by the Australian Defence Force (ADF) at an estimated cost of AUD130 million. The Papua New Guinea Government passed special legislation which gave unprecedented powers to foreign forces and security personnel to protect visiting leaders. The ADF supplied about 1500 personnel with airspace security provided by the Royal Australian Air Force and maritime security support provided by the Royal Australian Navy.

Other nations to provide security support to the summit included New Zealand, the United States, China, Canada, Japan and Indonesia. In total, about 2000 foreign military personnel were involved.

The New Zealand Defence Force provided the offshore Patrol Vessel HMNZS Otago with about 75 crew to assist with maritime security, a P-3 Orion detachment with 20 personnel to provide aerial surveillance, and up to 30 Special Operation Forces personnel. The United States Coast Guard provided in shore security in Port Moresby.

== Notes ==
Preceded by APEC Vietnam 2017	APEC meetings 2018	Succeeded by APEC Chile 2019
