= APEC Chile 2019 =

Cancelled economic meeting in Chile

- Host country: Chile
- Date: 16–17 November 2019 (cancelled)
- Venues: Santiago
- Follows: APEC Papua New Guinea 2018
- Precedes: APEC Malaysia 2020
- Website: apecchile2019.cl (archived)

APEC Chile 2019 would have been an Asia-Pacific Economic Cooperation (APEC) series of meetings in Chile. The meetings were supposed to take place in Santiago and focus on the digital economy, regional connectivity, and women's role in economic growth.

Chile previously hosted an APEC meeting in 2004. The 2019 summit was cancelled on 30 October due to ongoing protests.

== Attendees ==
This would have been the first APEC meeting for Peruvian President Martín Vizcarra, Vietnamese President Nguyễn Phú Trọng, Mexican President Andrés Manuel López Obrador and Papua New Guinean Prime Minister James Marape after their inaugurations and appointments on March 23, 2018, October 23, 2018, December 1, 2018, and May 30, 2019, respectively.

The only leader not in attendance would have been Russian President Vladimir Putin, owing to domestic priorities and commitments. Putin was planned to be represented by former Russian President, then-Prime Minister Dmitry Medvedev.

Attendees at the 2019 APEC Economic Leaders' Meeting
Member economy	Name as used in APEC	Position	Name
Australia	Australia	Prime Minister	Scott Morrison
Brunei	Brunei Darussalam	Sultan	Hassanal Bolkiah
Canada	Canada	Prime Minister	Justin Trudeau
Chile	Chile	President	Sebastián Piñera (host)
China	People's Republic of China	President (Note: The president of China is legally a ceremonial representative with no real power, but the general secretary of the Chinese Communist Party (de facto leader in one-party communist state) has always held this office since 1993 except for the months of transition.)	Xi Jinping
Hong Kong	Hong Kong, China	Chief Executive	Carrie Lam
Indonesia	Indonesia	President	Joko Widodo
Japan	Japan	Prime Minister	Shinzō Abe
South Korea	Republic of Korea	President	Moon Jae-in
Malaysia	Malaysia	Prime Minister	Mahathir Mohamad
Mexico	Mexico	President	Andrés Manuel López Obrador
New Zealand	New Zealand	Prime Minister	Jacinda Ardern
Papua New Guinea	Papua New Guinea	Prime Minister	James Marape
Peru	Peru	President	Martín Vizcarra
Philippines	Philippines	President	Rodrigo Duterte
Russia*	Russia	Prime Minister	Dmitry Medvedev
Singapore	Singapore	Prime Minister	Lee Hsien Loong
Taiwan	Chinese Taipei	Special Representative of President	Morris Chang
Thailand	Thailand	Prime Minister	Prayut Chan-o-cha
United States	United States	President	Donald Trump
Vietnam	Viet Nam	President (Note: The actual head of government of Vietnam is the Prime Minister. The President of Vietnam is legally the head of state, but the General Secretary of the Communist Party of Vietnam is the practical highest political leader in one-party communist state.)	Nguyễn Phú Trọng
(*) Russian President Vladimir Putin would have not attended the leaders' summit, prior to its cancellation. A representative was planned to attend on his behalf.

== Cancellation ==
APEC Chile 2019 was canceled due to large protests occurring across Chile. COP25, the United Nations conference focusing on climate change, was canceled at the same time. Chilean president Sebastian Pinera tweeted: "As president, I have the duty to put the needs of Chileans first. That is why, sadly, we decided to cancel the APEC and COP summits to guarantee order and peace [and] focus on dialogue and #NuevaAgendaSocial in order to produce urgent solutions to the main demands".

== Notes ==
Preceded by APEC Papua New Guinea 2018	APEC meetings 2019	Succeeded by APEC Malaysia 2020
