= Thirteenth East Asia Summit =

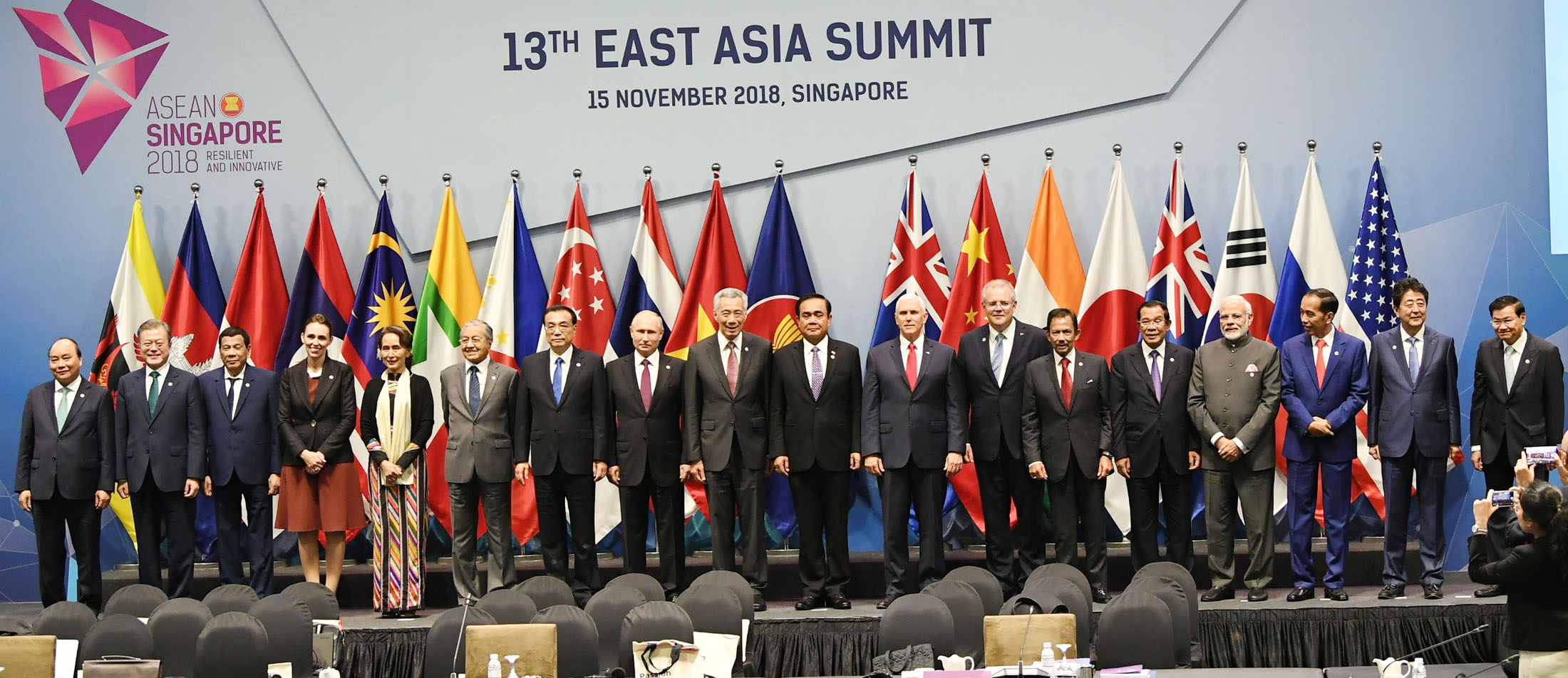
- Host country: Singapore
- Date: 14–15 November 2018
- Venues: Suntec Singapore Convention and Exhibition Centre
- Participants: EAS members
- Follows: Twelfth East Asia Summit
- Precedes: Fourteenth East Asia Summit

The Thirteenth East Asia Summit was held at the Suntec Singapore Convention and Exhibition Centre in Singapore on 14–15 November 2018. The East Asia Summit is an annual meeting of national leaders from the East Asian region and adjoining countries. East Asia Summit has evolved as forum for strategic dialogue and cooperation on political, security and economic issues of common regional concern and plays an important role in the regional architecture.

== Attending delegations ==
The heads of state and heads of government of the eighteen countries participated in the summit. The host of the 2018 East Asian Summit is also the chairperson of ASEAN, the Prime Minister of Singapore, Lee Hsien Loong.

U.S. President Donald Trump did not attend the summit but U.S. Vice President Mike Pence attended on his behalf.

=== Gallery ===
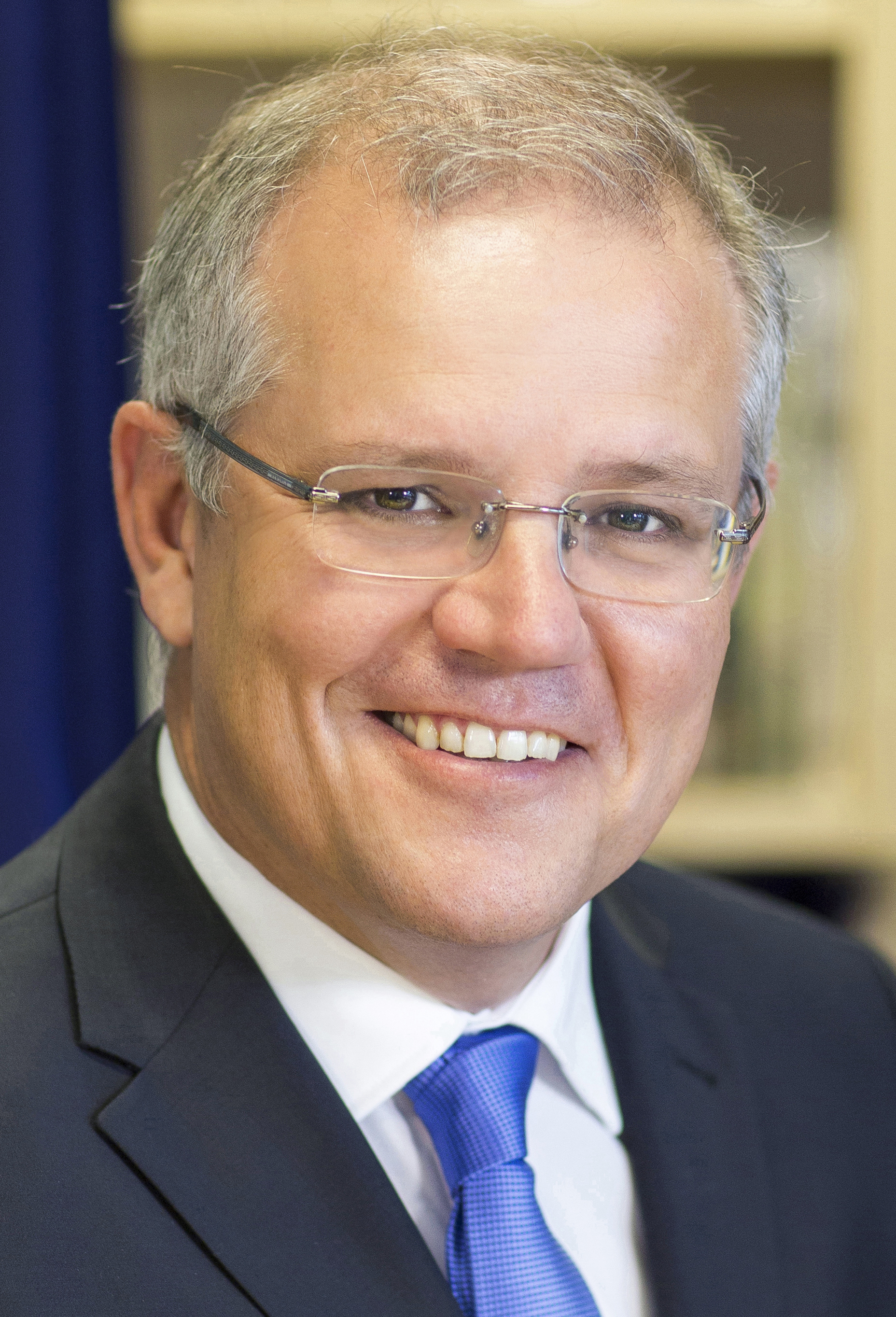
Australia
Prime Minister Scott Morrison

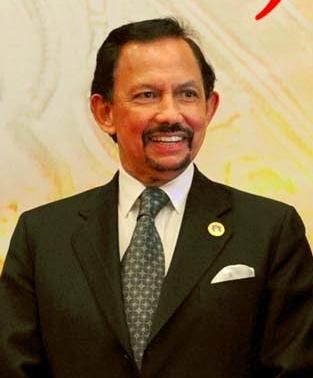
Brunei
Sultan Hassanal Bolkiah

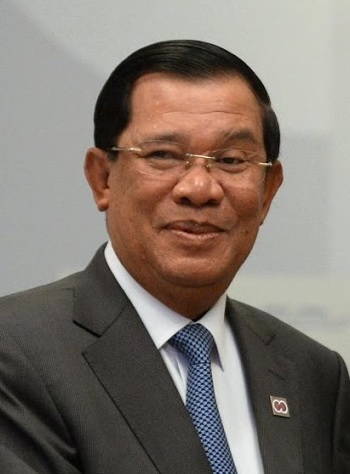
Cambodia
Prime Minister Hun Sen

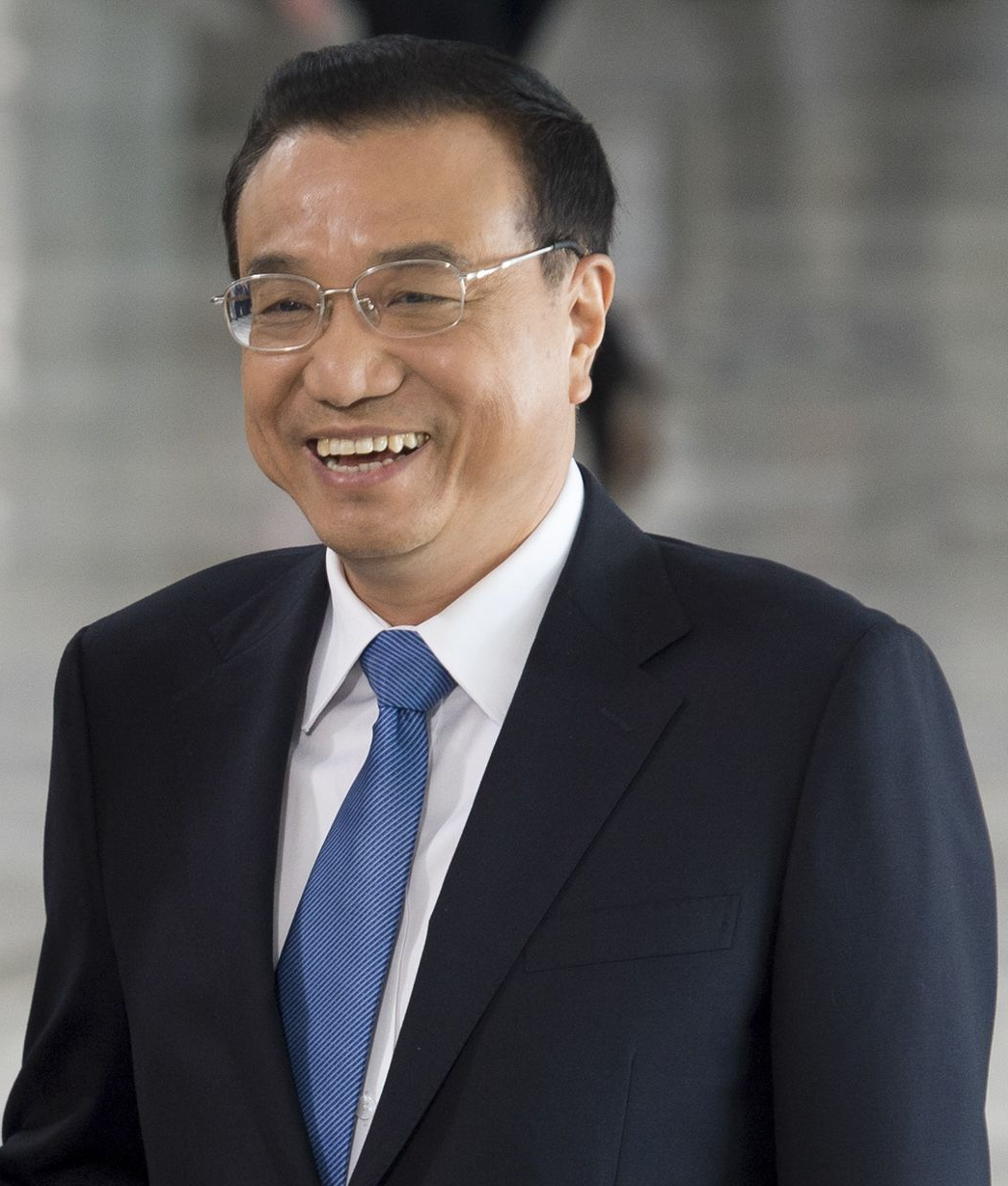
(China) China
Premier Li Keqiang

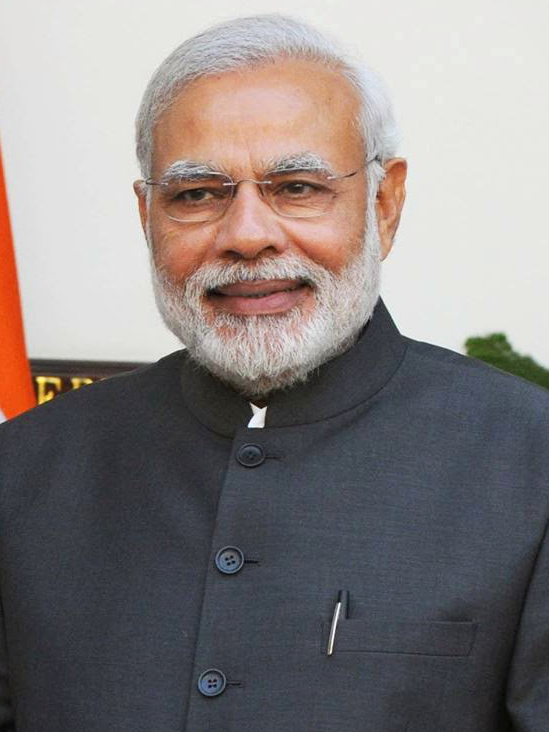
(India) India
Prime Minister Narendra Modi

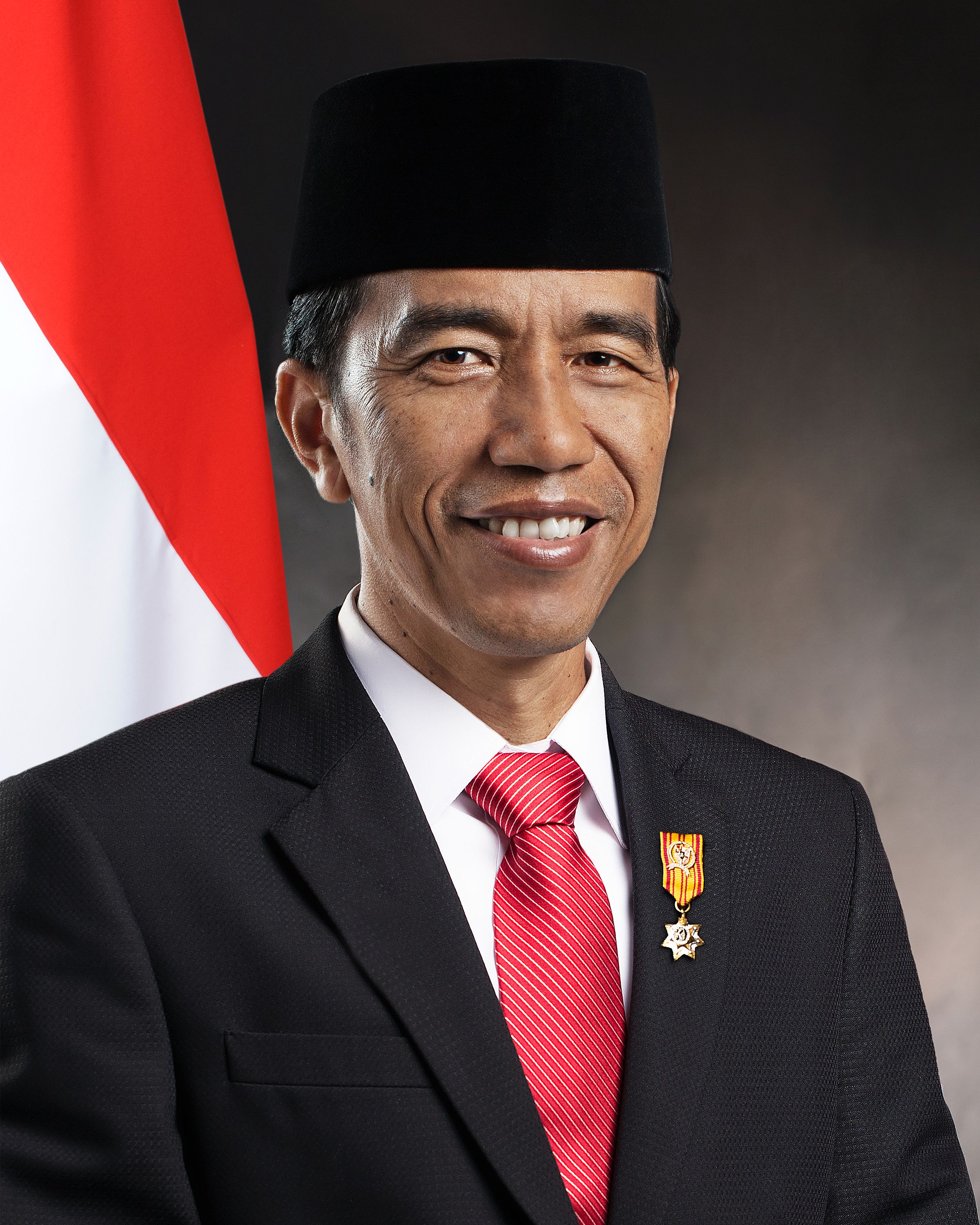
(Indonesia) Indonesia
President Joko Widodo

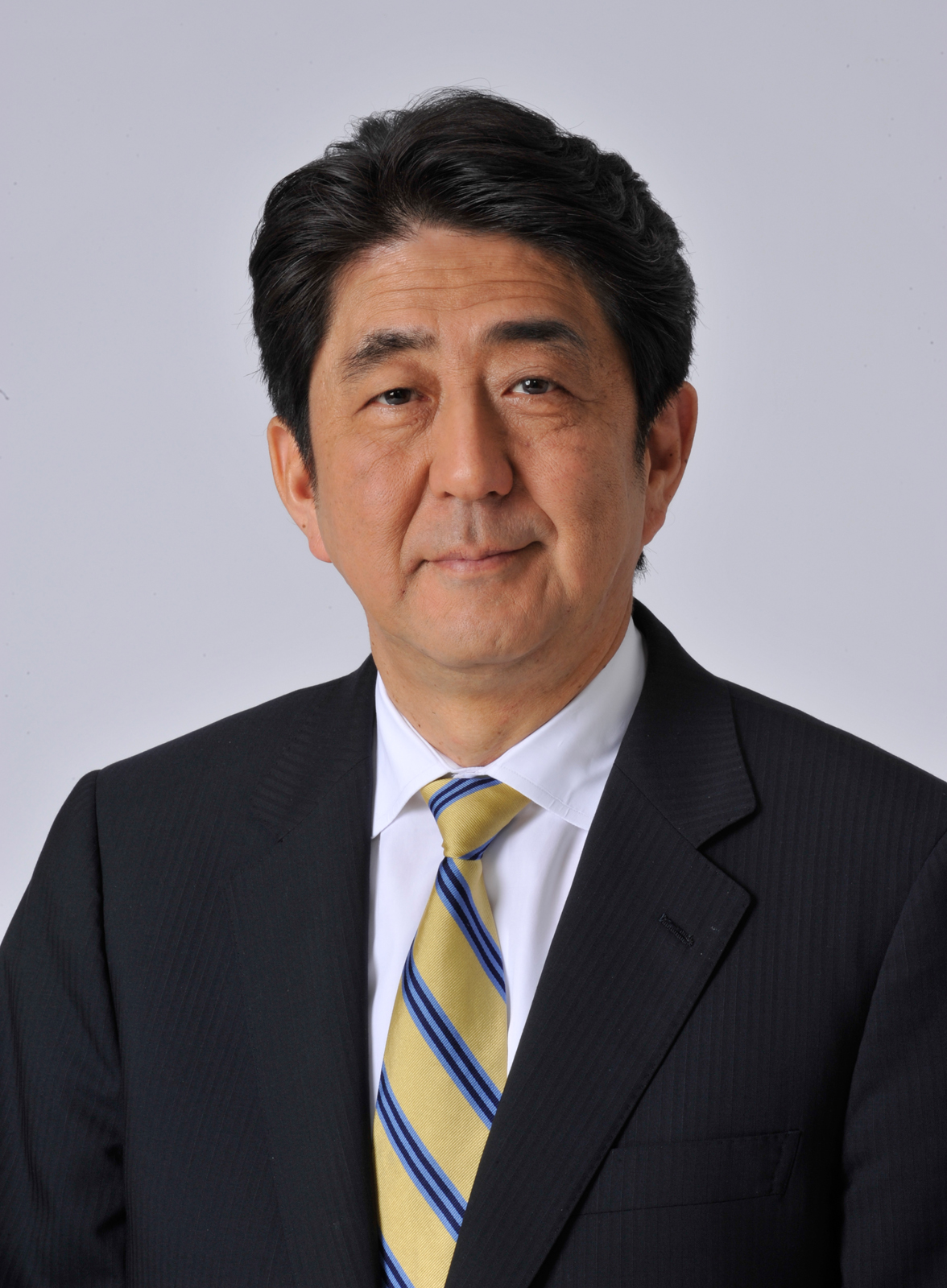
(Japan) Japan
Prime Minister Shinzō Abe

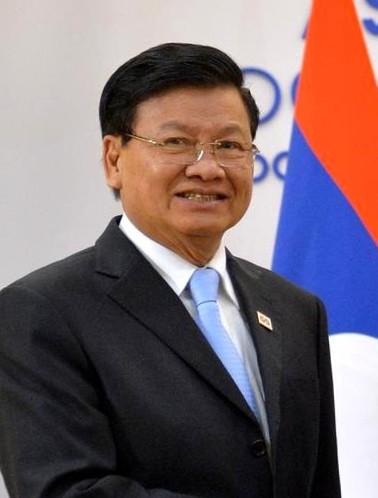
(Laos) Laos
Prime Minister Thongloun Sisoulith

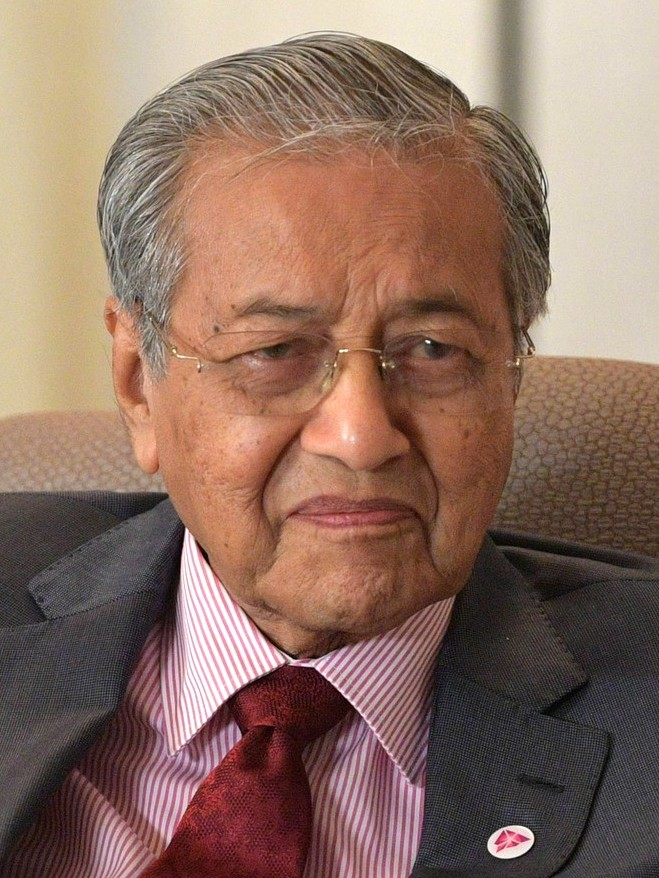
(Malaysia) Malaysia
Prime Minister Mahathir Mohamad

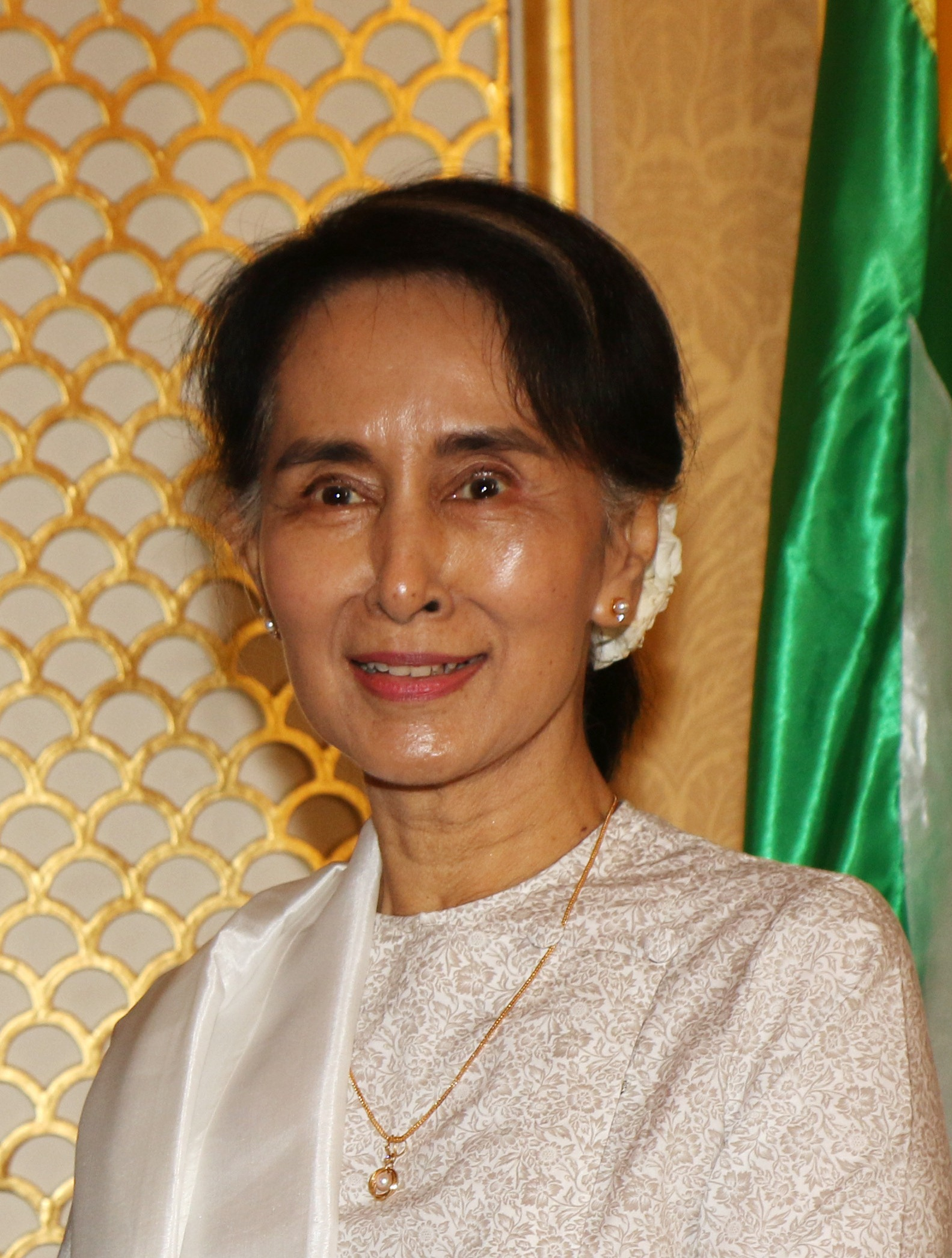
Myanmar
State Counsellor Aung San Suu Kyi

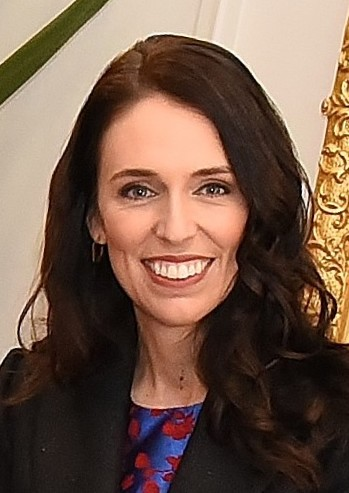
(New Zealand) New Zealand
Prime Minister Jacinda Ardern

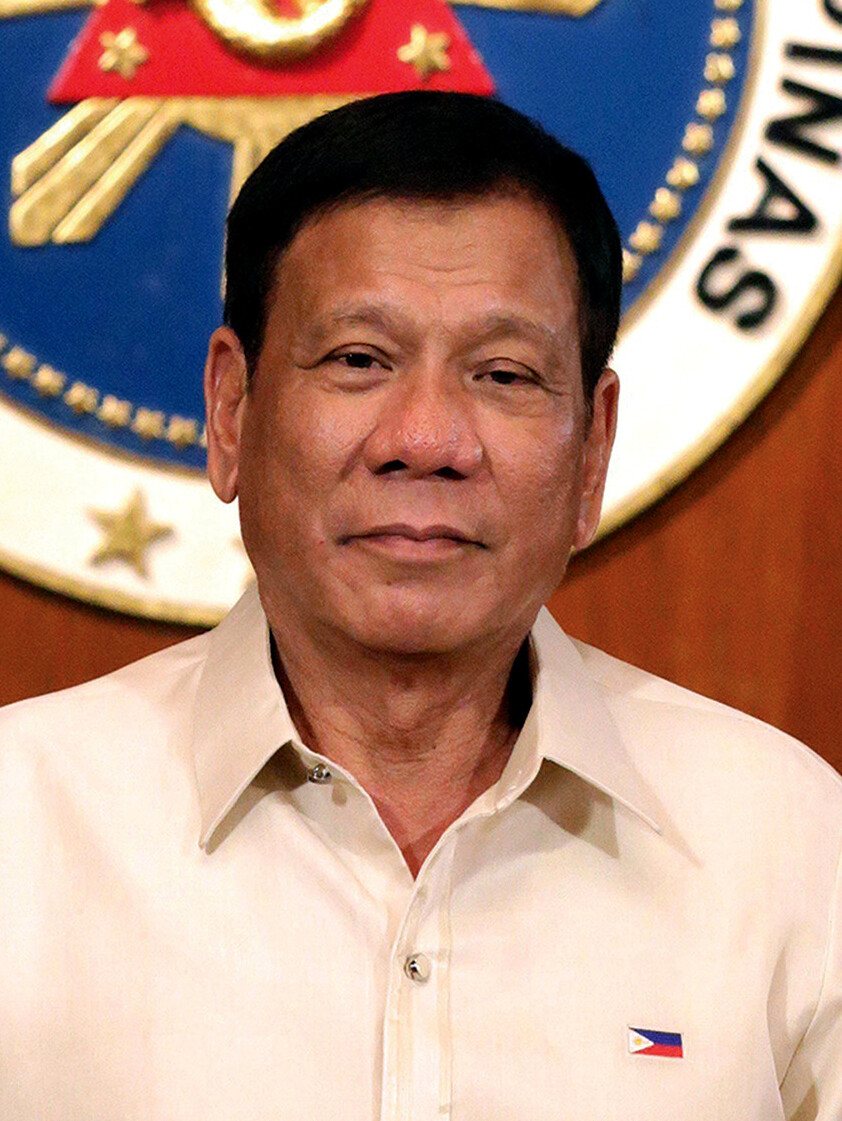
(Philippines) Philippines
President Rodrigo Duterte

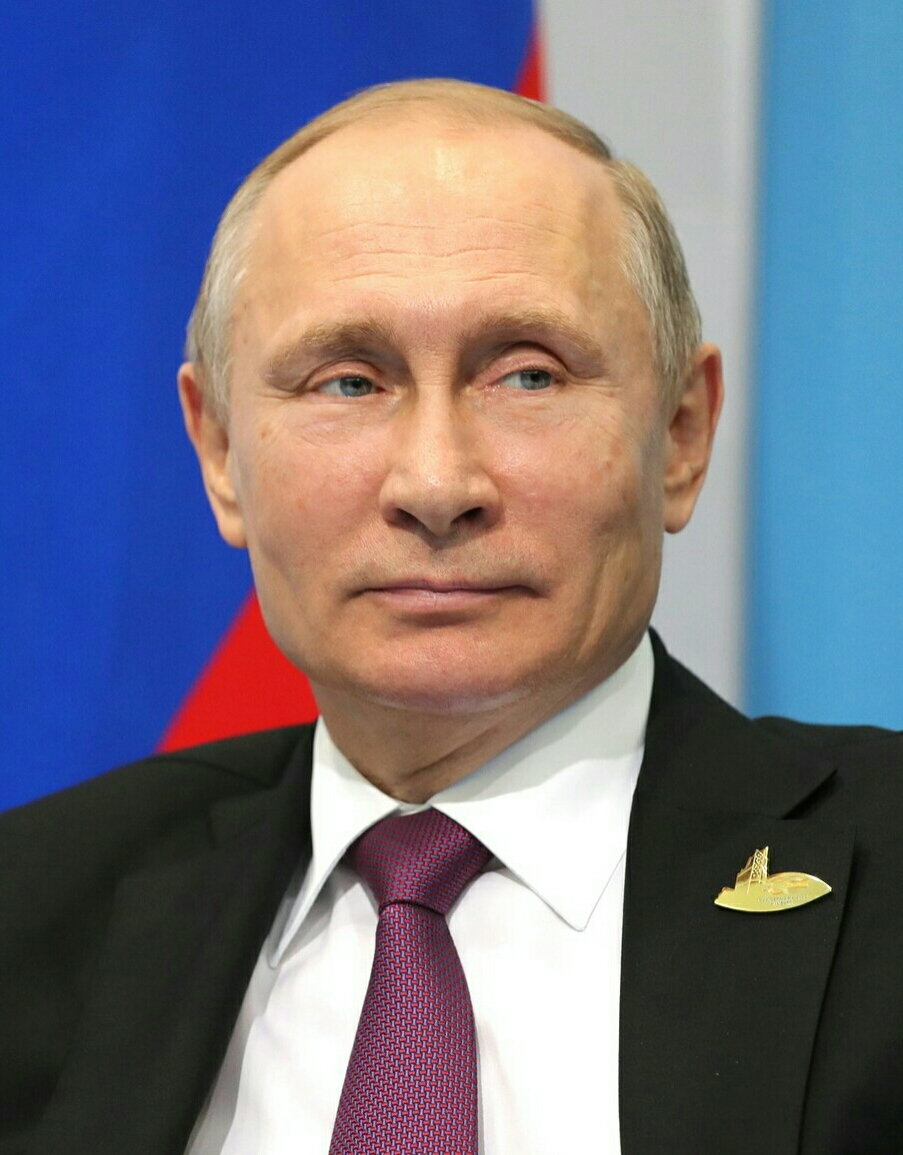
(Russia) Russia
President Vladimir Putin

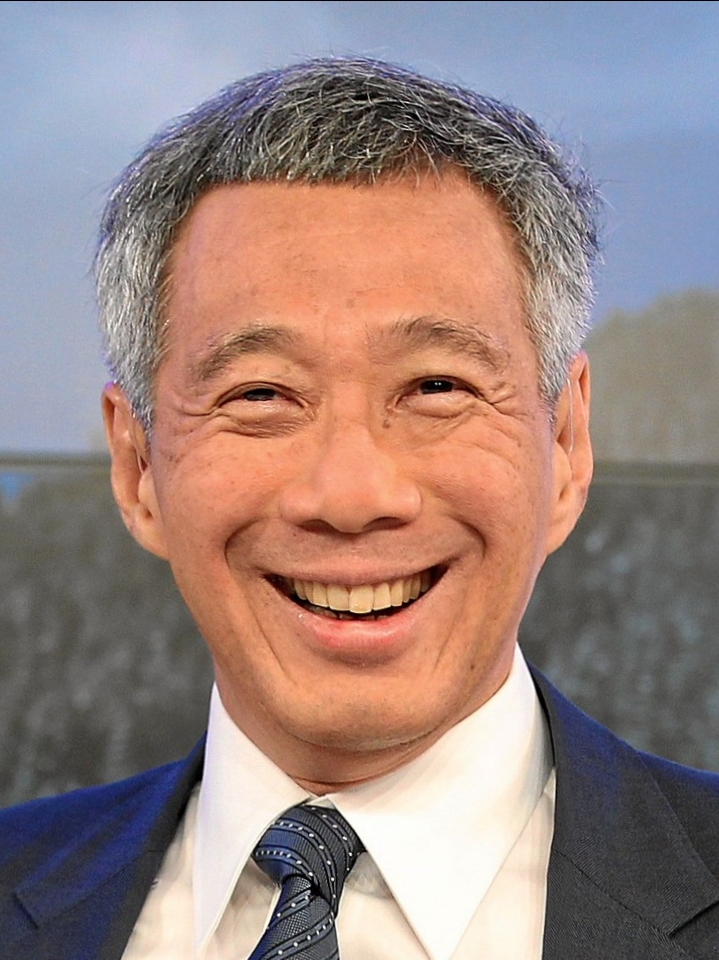
(Singapore) Singapore
Prime Minister Lee Hsien Loong (Chairperson)

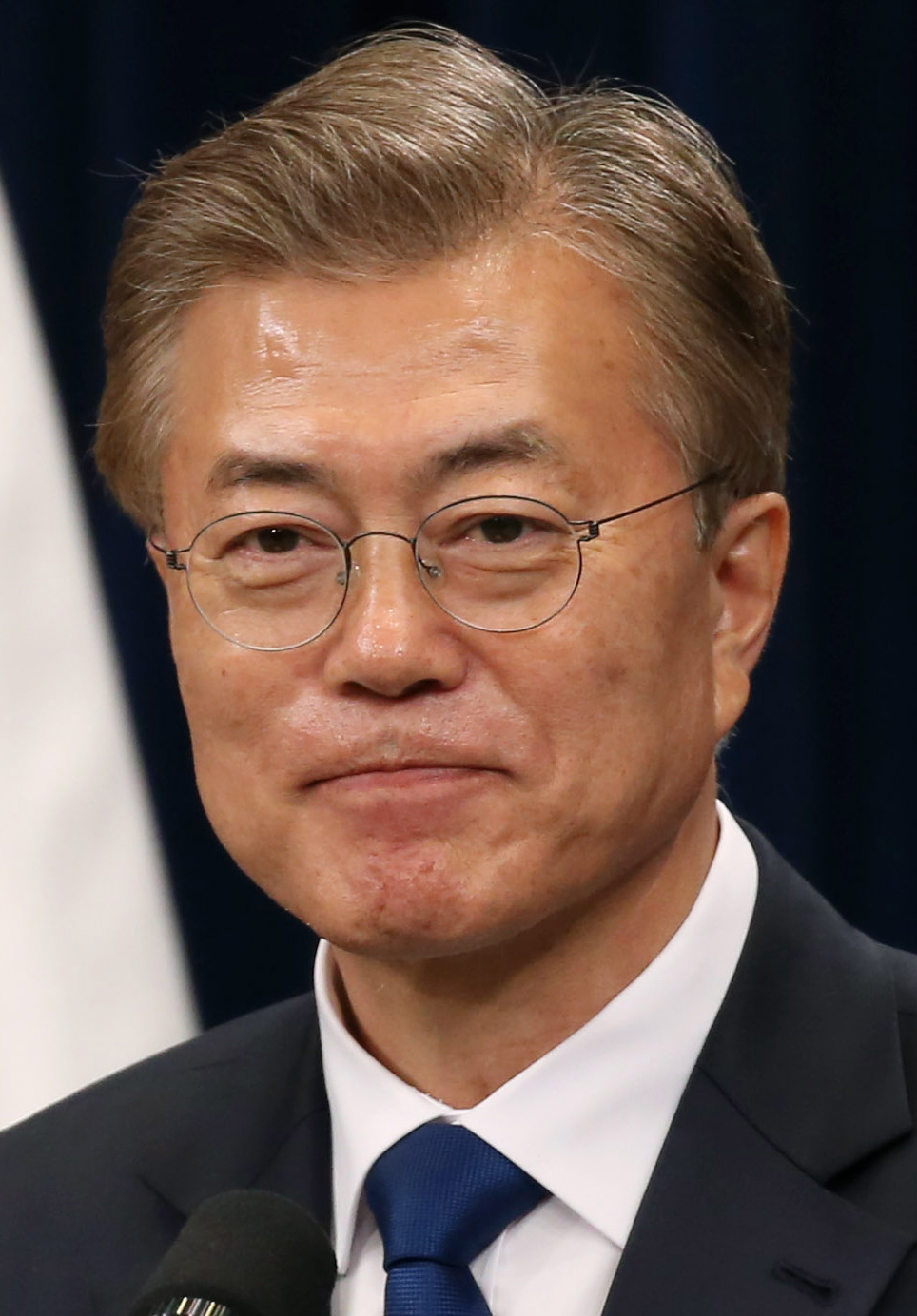
(South Korea) South Korea
President Moon Jae-in

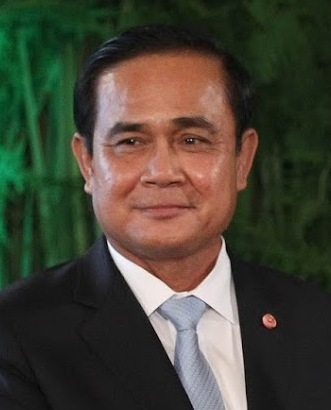
(Thailand) Thailand
Prime Minister Prayuth Chan-ocha

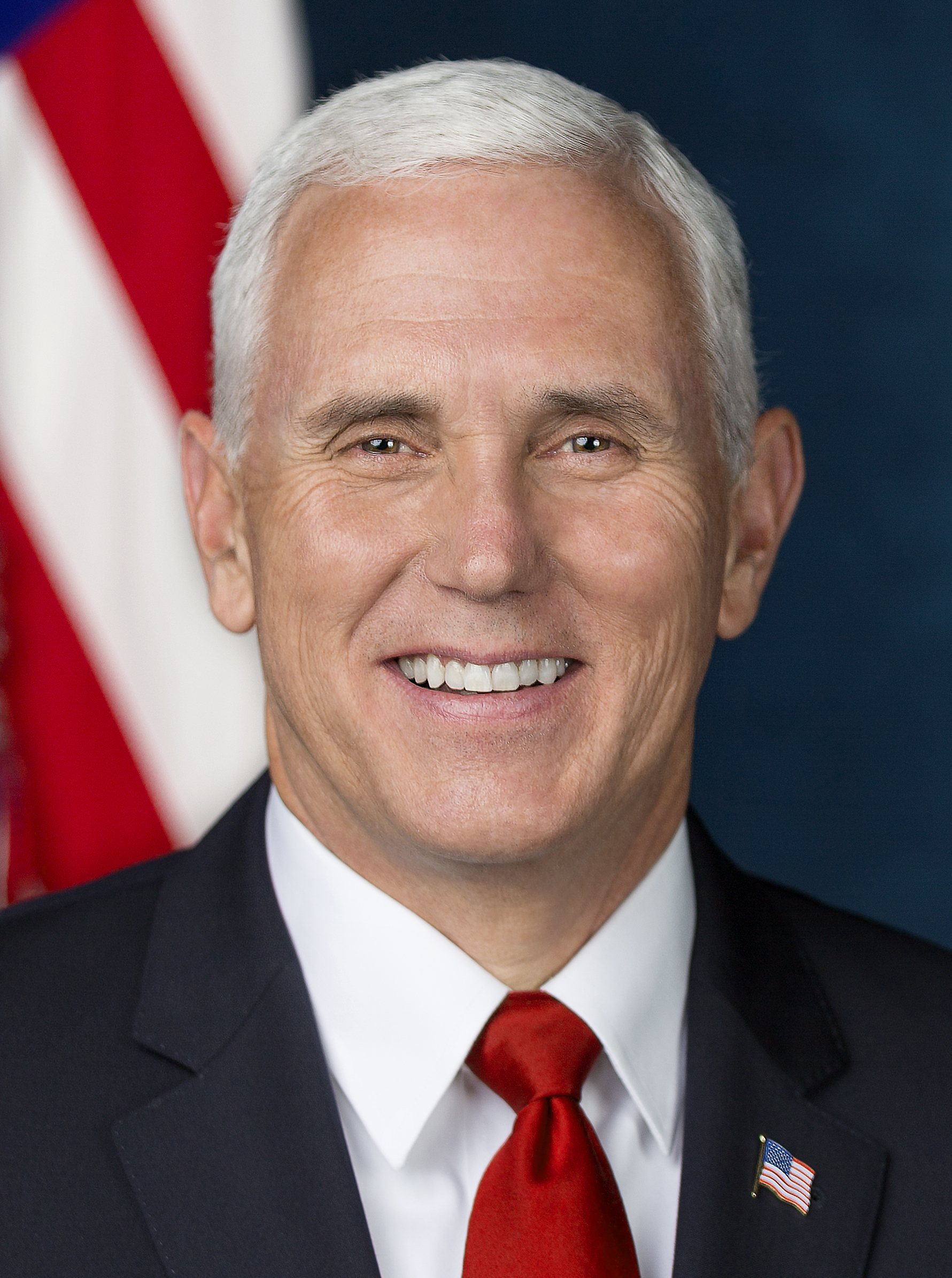
(United States) United States
Vice President Mike Pence

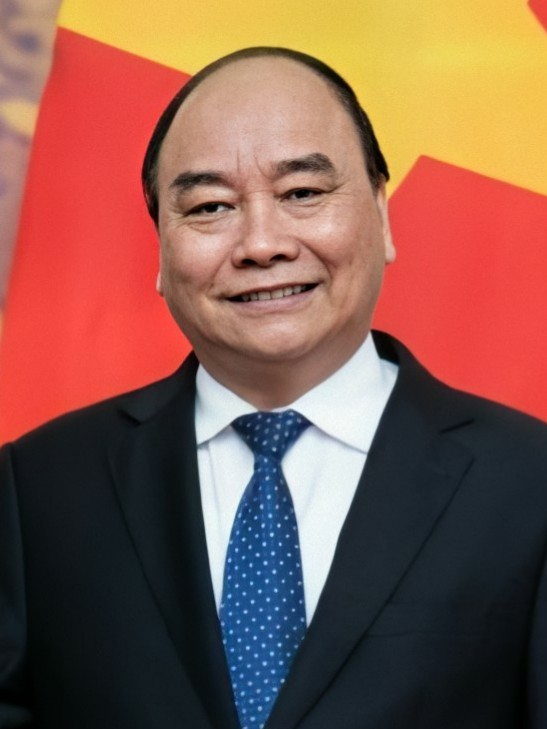
(Vietnam) Vietnam
Prime Minister Nguyễn Xuân Phúc

=== Guest invitees ===
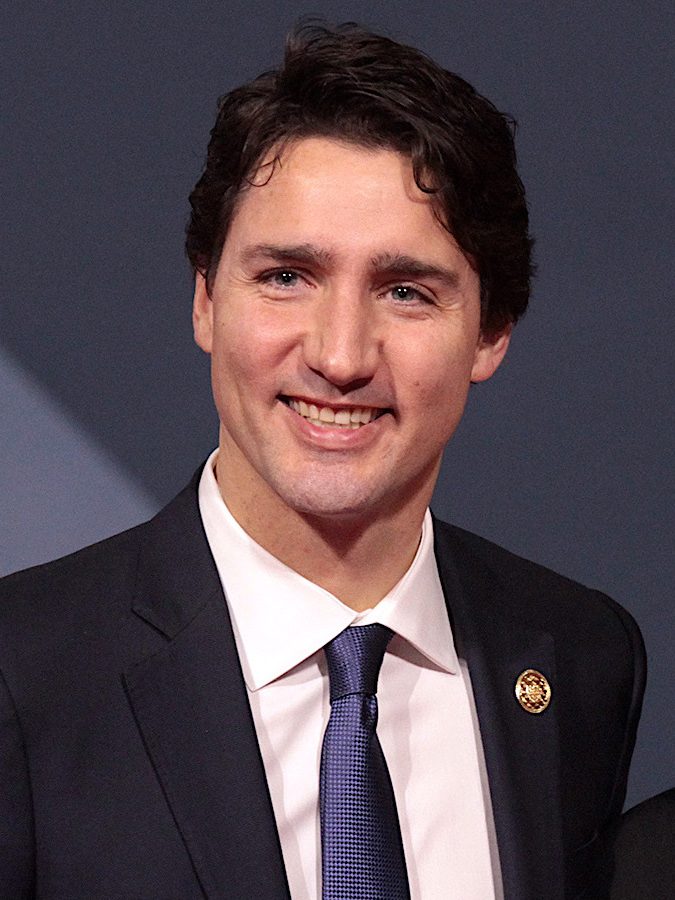
(Canada) Canada
Prime Minister Justin Trudeau
