= List of international prime ministerial visits undertaken by Narendra Modi =

This is a list of international prime ministerial trips made by Narendra Modi since he became the Prime Minister of India, following his first oath of office in 2014. The first overseas visit was to Bhutan in June 2014. He is the most widely-travelled Prime Minister of India.

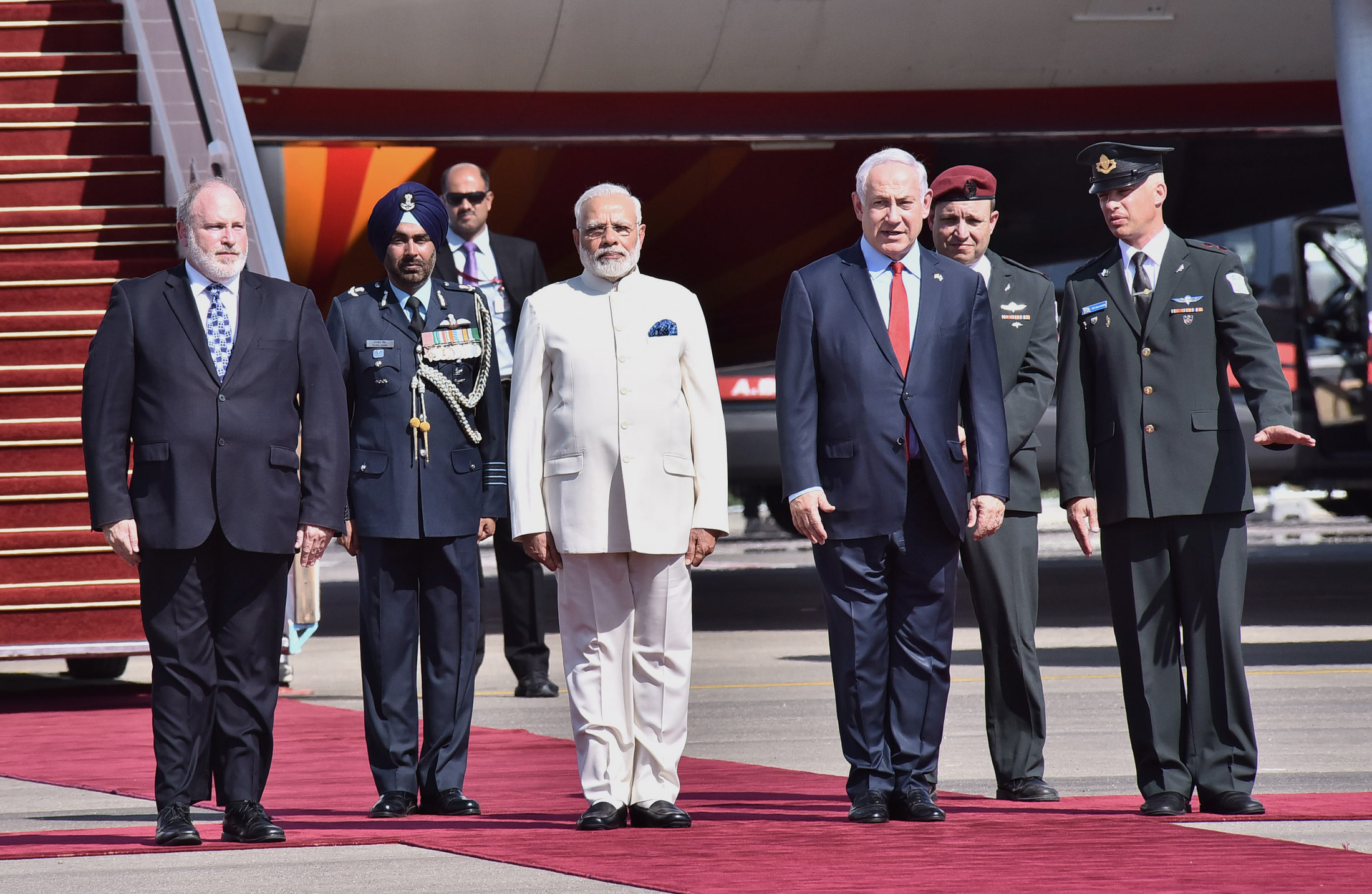
Prime Minister Narendra Modi being received by Prime Minister Benjamin Netanyahu, at Ben Gurion Airport, in Tel Aviv, Israel (July 2017).

== Summary of international trips ==
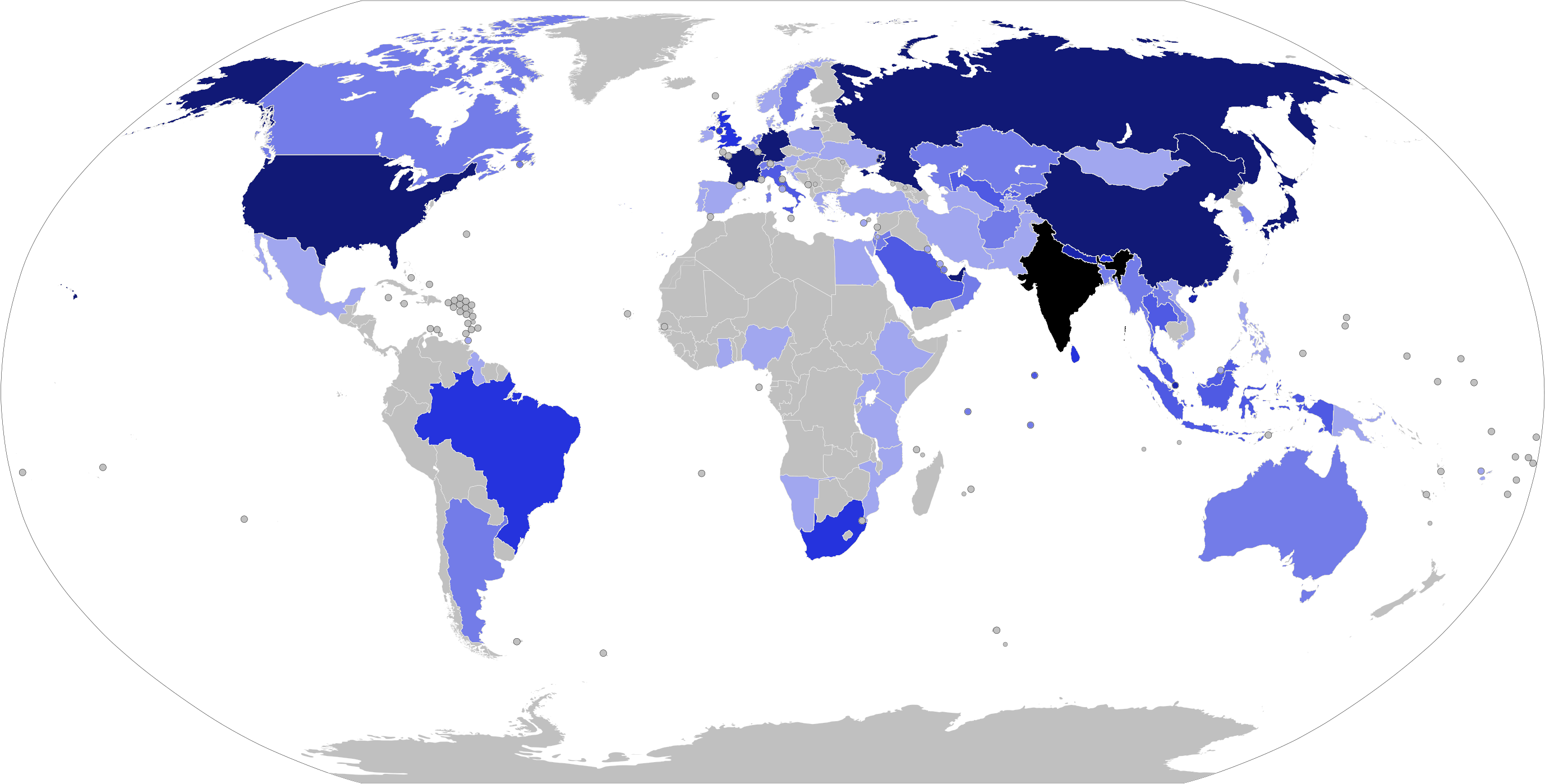
Map of international trips made by Narendra Modi as Prime Minister (as of June 2026).

As of November 2026, Narendra Modi has made 105 international trips, visiting 82 countries, including visits to the United States to attend the United Nations General Assembly.

As of November 2026:

One visit
Two visits
Three visits
Four visits
Five visits
Six or more visits
India

Prime Minister Narendra Modi's visits by country
Number of visits	Country
1 visit (41)	Austria, Bahrain, Belgium, Brunei, Croatia, Cyprus, Denmark, Egypt, Ethiopia, Fiji, Ghana, Greece, Guyana, Iran, Ireland, Kenya, Kuwait, Mexico, Mongolia, Mozambique, Namibia, New Zealand, Nigeria, Norway, Pakistan, Palestine, Papua New Guinea, Poland, Portugal, Rwanda, Slovakia, Spain, Tajikistan, Tanzania, Trinidad and Tobago, Turkey, Turkmenistan, Uganda, Ukraine, Vatican City, Vietnam
2 visits (18)	Afghanistan, Argentina, Bangladesh, Canada, Israel, Jordan, Kazakhstan, Laos, Mauritius, Netherlands, Myanmar, Oman, Philippines, Qatar, Seychelles, South Korea, Sweden, Switzerland
3 visits (7)	Australia, Italy, Kyrgyzstan, Malaysia, Maldives, Saudi Arabia, Thailand
4 visits (7)	Bhutan, Brazil, Indonesia, South Africa, Sri Lanka, United Kingdom, Uzbekistan
5 visits (2)	Nepal, Singapore
6 visits (2)	China, Germany
7 visits (1)	Russia
8 visits (3)	France, Japan, United Arab Emirates
10 visits (1)	United States

== 2014 ==
	Country	Areas visited	Date(s)	Purpose	Notes	Images
1	Bhutan	Paro, Thimphu	15–16 June	State visit	See also: Bhutan–India relations Details First foreign visit by Narendra Modi as Prime Minister.	
2	Brazil	Fortaleza, Brasília	13–17 July	6th BRICS summit	See also: Brazil–India relations	
3	Nepal	Kathmandu	3–5 August	Official visit	See also: India–Nepal relations Details Modi arrived for a two-day visit to Nepal on 3 August. The last visit of an Indian prime minister to Nepal was 17 years ago in 1997 by Inder Kumar Gujral.^{[Note I]} The talks with Nepal were focused on reviewing the 1950s Treaty of Peace and Friendship, India-funded hydroelectricity projects in Nepal and other infrastructure projects in Nepal. Following Jana Andolan, that marked the beginning of constitutional democracy in 1990, Modi became the first foreign leader to address a joint session of the Federal Parliament of Nepal. The Western media read it as a shift in foreign affairs for India, as well as a Nepal policy shift. He performed puja at the fifth century Pashupatinath temple (where he donated Rs. 25 crores and the high priest, Ganesh Bhatta, said: "I told him that we see him as a mascot for Hinduism, and appreciate his efforts in saving Hindu culture"). Further he pledged not to interfere in Nepal's internal affairs (following controversy of appointment of Indian priests at a Nepali temple), Modi announced a credit assistance programme of US$1 billion to Nepal and said "Nepal can free India of its darkness with its electricity. But [sic] we don't want free electricity, we want to buy it. Just by selling electricity to India, Nepal can find a place in the developed countries of the world." He also told Nepali MPs he wanted to turn India's "hostile borders benign and ultimately gateways for free trade and commerce...borders must be bridges not barriers." The Kathmandu Post reacted in writing: "Modi mantra warms Nepal's hearts." The New York Times also suggested the lack of a meeting with former King Gyanendra of Nepal signified that India would not support a return to monarchy despite the lack of a new constitution of Nepal. The commonality of a majority Hindu heritage was also played up.	
4	Japan	Kyoto, Tokyo	30 August–3 September	Official visit	See also: India–Japan relations Details Modi visited Japan on a five-day official trip from 30 August to 3 September, which is labelled as his first bilateral visit outside the subcontinent. His 2014 visit further strengthened the ties between the two countries, and resulted in several key agreements, including the elevating of the already established strategic partnership to the "Special Strategic Global Partnership". During his visit, official negotiations on the sale of 2 amphibious aircraft for the Indian Navy and the long pending civil nuclear agreements have both progressed.	
5	United Nations United States	New York City, Washington, D.C.	25 September–1 October	Official visit, General debate of the 69th United Nations General Assembly	See also: India and the United Nations and India–United States relations Details Modi delivered his maiden speech in the 69th session of the United Nations General Assembly on 27 September 2014, in which he called for the reform and expansion of the United Nations Security Council, most notably bringing attention to India's long standing demand of a permanent membership. He expressed his concerns over the relevance of a 20th century setup in the 21st century, and stressed the need to evaluate the UN's performance in the past 70 years. He also questioned why the UN should serve as the G-All for global governance, instead of several parallel sub-groupings like the G7 or G20. In the wake of the ISIS threat in West Asia and other similar threats in other parts of the world, Modi urged for the immediate implementation of the 'Comprehensive on International Terrorism' by the UN and offered India's pro-active role in it, citing India as a victim of terrorism for decades. Prior to his speech, he, along with Minister of External Affairs Sushma Swaraj, met with United Nations Secretary-General Ban Ki-moon to discuss issues relating to UN governance. Modi also ridiculed the possibility of any multilateral intervention on the issue of Kashmir, a demand Pakistani Prime Minister Nawaz Sharif made in his address at the UN General Assembly on 26 September, stating that the Indian government is ready for 'bilateral talks' with Pakistan provided that it cultivate a suitable environment for talks by giving up its terrorism policy against India. Modi commented briefly on climate change and the use of clean energy. In this regard, he also asked world leaders and UN officials to recognize and observe International Yoga Day, in order to emphasize the importance of incorporating Yoga into a modern-day lifestyle. Modi was also known to observe fast during a White House dinner for the Hindu festival of Navratri.	
6	Myanmar	Naypyidaw	11–13 November	9th East Asia summit, 12th ASEAN–India summit	See also: India–Myanmar relations	
6	Australia	Brisbane, Canberra, Melbourne, Sydney	14–18 November	2014 G20 Brisbane summit, Official visit	See also: Australia–India relations Details Modi addressed the joint meeting of the Parliament of Australia.	
6	Fiji	Suva	19–20 November	1st FIPIC summit	See also: Fiji–India relations Details Modi became the first Indian head of government to visit Fiji after 33 years, since Indira Gandhi's visit in 1981. While there, he also attended a 'Forum for India-Pacific Island cooperation' along with leaders from all 14 Pacific islands nations.	
7	Nepal	Kathmandu	25–27 November	18th SAARC summit	See also: India–Nepal relations Details This was Modi's first ever SAARC summit.	

== 2015 ==
	Country	Areas visited	Date(s)	Purpose	Notes	Images
8	Seychelles	Victoria	10–11 March		See also: India–Seychelles relations Details Modi's visit to Seychelles was part of his "Indian Ocean outreach" programme. While there, he held talks with President James Alexis Michel in order to strengthen maritime ties and enhance bilateral development and cooperation.	
8	Mauritius	Port Louis	11–13 March		See also: India–Mauritius relations Details Modi was the chief guest at the Mauritian National Day on 12 March.	
8	Sri Lanka	Colombo, Jaffna, Anuradhapura	13–14 March		See also: India–Sri Lanka relations Details Modi was scheduled to visit Sri Lanka earlier, in January 2015. He eventually made this visit from 13–15 March 2015, following newly-inaugurated Sri Lankan President Maithripala Sirisena's visit to New Delhi in February. During this trip, Modi also visited the city of Jafna in the Northern Province.	
9	Singapore	Singapore	28–29 March	State funeral of Lee Kuan Yew	See also: India–Singapore relations Details Prime Minister Modi attended the state funeral of Lee Kuan Yew, the first Prime Minister of Singapore. There, at the sidelines, he met several world leaders including the Israeli President. It was his first visit to Singapore, and he is expected to visit again during the later part of the year for the golden jubilee celebration of India and Singapore's diplomatic relations.	
10	France	Paris, Toulouse, Neuve-Chapelle	9–12 April		See also: France–India relations Details During his visit, Prime Minister Modi encouraged French companies to participate in the Make in India programme in defense, civil nuclear power and food processing. Prime Minister Modi also addressed the UNESCO.	
10	Germany	Berlin, Hanover	12–14 April		See also: Germany–India relations	
10	Canada	Ottawa, Toronto, Vancouver	14–17 April		See also: Canada–India relations Details Modi addressed a huge gathering of Indian-Canadians in Toronto, similar to his previous Madison Square Garden event in New York City.	
11	China	Xi'an, Beijing, Shanghai	14–16 May		See also: China–India relations Details Modi made his first visit to the People's Republic of China in May 2015. President Xi Jinping received Modi in Xi'an, his home town (akin to Xi's Ahmedabad trip last September, the home town of Modi), before official talks in Beijing.	
11	Mongolia	Ulaanbaatar	16–17 May		See also: India–Mongolia relations Details Modi became the first Indian Prime Minister to visit Mongolia.	
11	South Korea	Seoul	18–19 May		See also: India–South Korea relations Details Modi's visit to South Korea was part of India's East Asia policy and Modi's attempt to promote his Make in India concept to Korean investors.	
12	Bangladesh	Dhaka	6–7 June	State visit	See also: Bangladesh–India relations Details Prime Minister Modi paid a visit to Bangladesh from 6–7 June 2015 at the invitation of Sheikh Hasina, Prime Minister of Bangladesh. This visit, the Prime Minister's first to Bangladesh. During this visit, the Prime Minister discussed the ratification of the Bangladesh–India Land Boundary Agreement - 1974 & Protocol- 2011.	
13	Uzbekistan	Tashkent	6 July		See also: India–Uzbekistan relations	
13	Kazakhstan	Astana	7 July		See also: India–Kazakhstan relations	
13	Russia	Ufa	8–10 July	7th BRICS summit	See also: India–Russia relations Details First visit by Prime Minister Modi to Moscow. This was his second BRICS summit. This summit was a joint BRICS-SCO-EEU Summit. At this summit, the SCO (then consisting of 6 members) decided to admit India and Pakistan as full members.	
13	Turkmenistan	Ashgabat	10–11 July		See also: India–Turkmenistan relations	
13	Kyrgyzstan	Bishkek	12 July		See also: India–Kyrgyzstan relations	
13	Tajikistan	Dushanbe	12–14 July		See also: India–Tajikistan relations Details Prime Minister Modi to ask Tajikistan for lease of ex-Soviet airbase.	
14	United Arab Emirates	Abu Dhabi, Dubai	16–17 August		See also: India–United Arab Emirates relations Details This was the first Prime ministerial visit to the UAE in 34 years.	
15	Ireland	Dublin	23 September		See also: India–Ireland relations Details The agenda was related to trade, commerce and aviation.	
15	United Nations United States	New York City, San Francisco Bay Area	24–29 September	Official visit	See also: India and the United Nations and India–United States relations Details This was his second visit to the United States as prime minister and third bilateral summit with President Obama. During the visit, Prime Minister Modi also visited several cities in the San Francisco Bay Area, including San Francisco, San Jose and Mountain View, and met with the executives of several tech companies.	
16	United Kingdom	London, Chequers	12–14 November	Official visit	See also: India–United Kingdom relations Details Prime Minister Modi addressed the joint session of UK Parliament and also addressed a large gathering of Indian diaspora at Wembley Stadium in London.	
16	Turkey	Antalya	14–16 November	2015 G20 Antalya summit	See also: India–Turkey relations	
17	Malaysia	Kuala Lumpur	20–22 November	10th East Asia summit, 13th ASEAN–India summit	See also: India–Malaysia relations Details This was the Prime Minister's second visit to the East Asia summit and the related ASEAN–India summit.	
17	Singapore	Singapore	23–24 November		See also: India–Singapore relations Details Singaporean Prime Minister Lee Hsien Loong invited Modi to visit Singapore in 2015 to commemorate the 50th anniversary of India and Singapore's bilateral ties.	
18	United Nations France	Paris	28 November–30 November	2015 United Nations Climate Change Conference (COP21)	See also: India and the United Nations and France–India relations Details Prime Minister Modi participated in the Leaders Event of the COP21 conference to set out India's Strategy to contain global warming.	
19	Russia	Moscow	23–24 December	16th India–Russia annual summit	See also: India–Russia relations	
19	Afghanistan	Kabul	25 December		See also: Afghanistan–India relations	
19	Pakistan	Lahore	25 December	Informal visit	See also: India–Pakistan relations Details Informal meeting with Pakistani Prime Minister Nawaz Sharif in Lahore on the way back from Kabul. Attended the wedding celebrations of PM Sharif's granddaughter at his residence.	

== 2016 ==
	Country	Areas visited	Date(s)	Purpose	Notes	Images
20	European Union Belgium	Brussels	30 March	14th India–European Union summit	See also: India–European Union relations and Belgium–India relations	
20	United States	Washington, D.C.	31 March–1 April	2016 Nuclear Security summit	See also: India–United States relations	
20	Saudi Arabia	Riyadh	2–3 April		See also: India–Saudi Arabia relations Details The agenda of this visit was energy, security, trade and well-being of Indian workers Modi is first Indian conferred Order of King Abdulaziz, Saudi Arabia's highest honour for non-Muslim dignitaries.	
21	Iran	Tehran	22–23 May		See also: India–Iran relations Details Connectivity and infrastructure, energy partnership with Iran, and bilateral trade.	
22	Afghanistan	Herat	4 June	Working visit	See also: Afghanistan–India relations Details Narendra Modi inaugurated the Afghan–India Friendship Dam on the river Hari in Chist-e-Sharif in Herat province. During his visit he was also conferred with Afghanistan's highest civilian award Amir Amanullah Khan Award.	
22	Qatar	Doha	4–5 June		See also: India–Qatar relations Details Held talks with Emir of Qatar Tamim bin Hamad Al Thani on bilateral issues including to boost economic ties and in the hydrocarbon sector.	
22	Switzerland	Geneva	6 June		See also: India–Switzerland relations Details Held discussions on black money issue and Nuclear Suppliers Group membership.	
22	United States	Washington, D.C.	6–8 June		See also: India–United States relations Details Held progress review meeting with President Barack Obama on defence, security and energy, and also addressed a joint session of the United States Congress.	
22	Mexico	Mexico City	9 June	Working visit	See also: India–Mexico relations Details Held discussions regarding Nuclear Suppliers Group membership.	
23	Uzbekistan	Tashkent	23–24 June	2016 Tashkent SCO summit	See also: India–Uzbekistan relations Details At this summit, India and Pakistan signed the memorandum of obligations to join the SCO as full members. They would be admitted as full members at the next summit.	
24	Mozambique	Maputo	7 July		See also: India–Mozambique relations	
24	South Africa	Pretoria, Durban, Johannesburg, Pietermaritzburg	8–9 July		See also: India–South Africa relations	
24	Tanzania	Dar es Salaam	10 July		See also: India–Tanzania relations	
24	Kenya	Nairobi	11 July		See also: India–Kenya relations	
25	Vietnam	Hanoi	2–3 September		See also: India–Vietnam relations	
25	China	Hangzhou	4–5 September	2016 G20 Hangzhou summit	See also: China–India relations	
26	Laos	Vientiane	7–8 September	11th East Asia summit, 14th ASEAN–India summit	See also: India–Laos relations	
27	Thailand	Bangkok	10 November	Stop-over for the state funeral of Bhumibol Adulyadej	See also: India–Thailand relations Details Paid homage to the Late King Bhumibol Adulyadej at Grand Palace, Bangkok.	
27	Japan	Tokyo, Kobe	10–12 November		See also: India–Japan relations Details Prime Minister Modi and Prime Minister of Japan Shinzo Abe boarded the Shinkansen bullet train from Tokyo Station to Kobe and visited the Kawasaki Heavy Industries Plant that manufactures the Shinkansen.	

== 2017 ==
	Country	Areas visited	Date(s)	Purpose	Notes	Images
28	Sri Lanka	Colombo, Kandy	11–12 May	International Day of Vesak celebrations	See also: India–Sri Lanka relations Details Visited Tamil community in Sri Lanka.	
29	Germany	Meseberg, Berlin	29–30 May		See also: Germany–India relations	
29	Spain	Madrid	30–31 May		See also: India–Spain relations	
29	Russia	Saint Petersburg	31 May–2 June	18th India–Russia annual summit	See also: India–Russia relations Details Also attended St. Petersburg International Economic Forum as a guest.	
29	France	Paris	2–3 June		See also: France–India relations	
30	Kazakhstan	Astana	8–9 June	2017 Astana SCO summit	See also: India–Kazakhstan relations Details India and Pakistan officially joined the SCO as full members at this summit, taking the membership of the SCO from 6 to 8.	
31	Portugal	Lisbon	24 June		See also: India–Portugal relations Details 11 agreements signed included cooperation in outer space, double taxation avoidance, nano technology, improving cultural ties, youth and sports, higher education, scientific research, and setting up of an India–Portugal Business Hub and an Indian Chamber of Commerce.	
31	United States	Washington, D.C.	25–26 June		See also: India–United States relations Details First bilateral meet of Narendra Modi and Donald Trump.	
31	Netherlands	Amsterdam, The Hague	27 June		See also: India–Netherlands relations Details 3 MoUs signed in fields of Cultural, Water Cooperation and Social Security.	
32	Israel	Jerusalem, Haifa, Tel Aviv	4–6 July		See also: India–Israel relations Details Landmark first visit by an Indian Prime Minister. 7 MoUs signed: Industrial Research and Development and Technological Innovation Fund, Water Conservation, State Water Utility Reform, 3-year work program in Agriculture 2018–20, cooperation regarding atomic clocks, GEO-LEO optical link, Electric Propulsion for Small Satellites.	
32	Germany	Hamburg	7–8 July	2017 G20 Hamburg summit	See also: Germany–India relations	
33	China	Xiamen	3–5 September	9th BRICS summit	See also: China–India relations	
33	Myanmar	Bagan, Yangon, Naypyidaw	6–7 September		See also: India–Myanmar relations	
34	Philippines	Manila	12–14 November	12th East Asia summit, 15th ASEAN–India summit	See also: India–Philippines relations	

== 2018 ==
	Country	Areas visited	Date(s)	Purpose	Notes	Images
35	Switzerland	Davos	22–23 January	World Economic Forum	See also: India–Switzerland relations	
36	Jordan	Amman	9 February	Transit	See also: India–Jordan relations Details First visit by an Indian Prime Minister in 30 years. Meeting with Prime Minister Hani Al-Mulki and King Abdullah II of Jordan, discussions for India–Jordan bilateral relations.	
36	Palestine	Ramallah	10 February		Details First visit by an Indian Prime Minister. Signed six agreements worth around USD 50 million that includes setting up of a USD 30 million super speciality hospital in Beit Sahur. Construction of a centre for empowering women. During his visit he was conferred the highest civilian award of the Palestine, Grand Collar of the State of Palestine	
36	United Arab Emirates	Abu Dhabi, Dubai	10–11 February		See also: India–United Arab Emirates relations Details Awarding a consortium of Indian oil companies a 10% stake in offshore oil concession; administration of contractual employment of Indian workers in the Gulf country; technical cooperation in railways, joint research and technology transfer; cooperation in the field of finance, an MoU between Bombay Stock Exchange and Abu Dhabi Securities Exchange; multi-modal logistics park and hub in Jammu comprising warehouses and specialised storage solutions.	
36	Oman	Muscat	11–12 February		See also: India–Oman relations Details Met Sultan Qaboos; signed eight agreements, including an MoU on legal and judicial cooperation in civil and commercial matters; signed annexutre to the MoU on military cooperation; academic and scholarly cooperation between National Defence College, Sultanate of Oman and the Institute for Defence Studies and Analyses; cooperation between Foreign Service Institute, Ministry of External Affairs, India and Oman's Diplomatic Institute; cooperation in the field of health, tourism and peaceful uses of outer space; legal and judicial cooperation in civil and commercial matters;	
37	Sweden	Stockholm	16–18 April	1st India–Nordic summit	See also: India–Sweden relations	
37	United Kingdom	London	18–20 April	2018 Commonwealth Heads of Government Meeting	See also: India–United Kingdom relations	
37	Germany	Berlin	20 April	Working visit	See also: Germany–India relations	
38	China	Wuhan	27–28 April	Informal summit	See also: China–India relations	
39	Nepal	Janakpur, Kathmandu	11–12 May	Working visit	See also: India–Nepal relations	
40	Russia	Sochi	21–22 May	Informal summit	See also: India–Russia relations	
41	Indonesia	Jakarta	29–30 May		See also: India–Indonesia relations	
41	Malaysia	Kuala Lumpur	31 May	Working visit	See also: India–Malaysia relations Details Discussions with Malaysian Prime Minister Mahathir Mohamad on defence, maritime security and strategic access to ports.	
41	Singapore	Singapore	31 May–2 June		See also: India–Singapore relations Details Met with Singapore's Prime Minister Lee Hsien Loong on agreements concerning peace and security in the Indo-Pacitic region, naval cooperation, among others topics.	
42	China	Qingdao	9–10 June	2018 Qingdao SCO summit	See also: China–India relations	
43	Rwanda	Kigali, Rweru model village	23–24 July	State visit	See also: India–Rwanda relations	
43	Uganda	Entebbe, Kampala	24–25 July	State visit	See also: India–Uganda relations	
43	South Africa	Johannesburg	25–28 July	10th BRICS summit	See also: India–South Africa relations	
44	Nepal	Kathmandu	30–31 August	4th BIMSTEC summit	See also: India–Nepal relations	
45	Japan	Tokyo, Narusawa	27–30 October	Official visit	See also: India–Japan relations	
46	Singapore	Singapore	13–15 November	13th East Asia summit	See also: India–Singapore relations	
47	Maldives	Malé	17 November	Swearing-in ceremony of Ibrahim Mohamed Solih	See also: India–Maldives relations	
48	Argentina	Buenos Aires	28 November–3 December	2018 G20 Buenos Aires summit	See also: Argentina–India relations	

== 2019 ==
	Country	Areas visited	Date(s)	Purpose	Notes	Images
49	South Korea	Seoul	21–22 February		See also: India–South Korea relations	
50	Maldives	Malé	8 June		See also: India–Maldives relations	
50	Sri Lanka	Colombo	9 June		See also: India–Sri Lanka relations	
51	Kyrgyzstan	Bishkek	13–14 June	2019 Bishkek SCO summit	See also: India–Kyrgyzstan relations	
52	Japan	Osaka	27–29 June	2019 G20 Osaka summit	See also: India–Japan relations	
53	Bhutan	Thimphu	17–18 August	State visit	See also: Bhutan–India relations	
54	France	Paris	22–23 August	Official visit	See also: France–India relations	
54	United Arab Emirates	Abu Dhabi	23–24 August		See also: India–United Arab Emirates relations Details During his visit, the prime minister met Sheikh Mohammed bin Zayed Al Nahyan, Crown Prince of Abu Dhabi and received the Order of Zayed, the highest civilian award of the UAE.	
54	Bahrain	Manama, Riffa	24–25 August		See also: Bahrain–India relations Details First ever visit by an Indian prime minister to the Kingdom. During his visit, He held talks with Sheikh Khalifa bin Salman Al Khalifa, Prime Minister of Bahrain and received the Order of the Renaissance, the third highest civilian decoration of Bahrain.	
54	France	Biarritz	25–26 August	45th G7 summit	See also: France–India relations	
55	Russia	Vladivostok	4–5 September	Official visit, 5th Eastern Economic Forum	See also: India–Russia relations	
56	United Nations United States	New York City, Houston, Chicago	21–28 September	General debate of the 74th United Nations General Assembly, 1st India–Caribbean summit, Howdy Modi community event	See also: India and the United Nations and India–United States relations Details Prime Minister Modi addressed the 74th session of the United Nations General Assembly and later an event in Houston with Indian Americans along US President Donald Trump and took part in bilateral and multilateral talks with the heads of government of Pacific island nations. In another event at New York he was presented the Global Goalkeeper Award by Bill & Melinda Gates Foundation.	
57	Saudi Arabia	Riyadh	28–29 October		See also: India–Saudi Arabia relations	
58	Thailand	Bangkok	2–4 November	14th East Asia summit, 16th ASEAN–India summit	See also: India–Thailand relations	
59	Brazil	Brasília	13–15 November	11th BRICS summit	See also: Brazil–India relations	

== 2020 ==
Prime Minister Modi did not make any international trips in 2020 due to the COVID-19 pandemic.

== 2021 ==
	Country	Areas visited	Date(s)	Purpose	Notes	Images
60	Bangladesh	Dhaka, Ishwaripur, Orakandi	26–27 March	Official visit	See also: Bangladesh–India relations	
61	United Nations United States	New York City, Washington, D.C.	22–26 September	General debate of the 76th United Nations General Assembly, 2nd Quad leaders' summit	See also: India and the United Nations and India–United States relations Details Prime Minister Modi held bilateral talks with Joe Biden, President of the United States, Scott Morrison, Prime Minister of Australia, Yoshihide Suga, Prime Minister of Japan and CEOs of some companies in Washington D.C. He also participated in the first in-person Quad leaders' summit at White House. Prime Minister addressed the 76th session of the United Nations General Assembly in New York City.	
62	Italy	Rome	29–31 October	2021 G20 Rome summit	See also: India–Italy relations	
62	Vatican City	Vatican City	30 October	Working visit	See also: Holy See–India relations	
62	United Nations United Kingdom	Glasgow	1–2 November	2021 United Nations Climate Change Conference (COP26)	See also: India and the United Nations and India–United Kingdom relations	

== 2022 ==
	Country	Areas visited	Date(s)	Purpose	Notes	Images
63	Germany	Berlin	2 May	Official visit	See also: Germany–India relations Details Prime Minister Modi met German Chancellor Olaf Scholz and co-chaired the 6th India–Germany Inter-Governmental Consultations.	
63	Denmark	Copenhagen	3–4 May	2nd India–Nordic summit	See also: Denmark–India relations Details Prime Minister Modi met Danish Prime Minister Mette Frederiksen and Queen Margrethe II. He also attended on 2nd India–Nordic Summit in Copenhagen and met Finnish Prime Minister Sanna Marin, Icelandic Prime Minister Katrín Jakobsdóttir, Norwegian Prime Minister Jonas Gahr Støre, and Swedish Prime Minister Magdalena Andersson.	
63	France	Paris	4–5 May	Working visit	See also: France–India relations Details Prime Minister Modi met French President Emmanuel Macron who had just been re-elected as President for a second term.	
64	Nepal	Lumbini	16 May	Working visit	See also: Nepal–India relations Details Prime Minister Modi visited Lumbini at the invitation of Nepalese Prime Minister Sher Bahadur Deuba on the occasion of Buddha Purnima.	
65	Japan	Tokyo	23–24 May	4th Quad leaders' summit	See also: India–Japan relations Details Prime Minister Modi participated in the Quad leaders' summit and held bilateral talks with Japanese Prime Minister Fumio Kishida, Australian Prime Minister Anthony Albanese and US President Joe Biden.	
66	Germany	Krün	26–27 June	48th G7 summit	See also: Germany–India relations	
66	United Arab Emirates	Abu Dhabi	28 June	Personal visit due to the demise of President Sheikh Khalifa bin Zayed Al Nahyan.	See also: India–United Arab Emirates relations	
67	Uzbekistan	Samarkand	15–16 September	2022 Samarkand SCO summit	See also: India–Uzbekistan relations	
68	Japan	Tokyo	26–27 September	State funeral of Shinzo Abe	See also: India–Japan relations	
69	Indonesia	Nusa Dua	14–16 November 2022	2022 G20 Bali summit	See also: India–Indonesia relations	

== 2023 ==
	Country	Areas visited	Date(s)	Purpose	Notes	Images
70	Japan	Hiroshima	19–21 May	49th G7 summit, 5th Quad leaders' summit	See also: India–Japan relations	
70	Papua New Guinea	Port Moresby	21–22 May	3rd FIPIC summit	See also: India–Papua New Guinea relations Details Attended FIPIC summit hosted by Papuan Prime Minister James Marape, received Order of Logohu, the highest civilian honour of Papua New Guinea and Order of Fiji, the highest civilian honour of Fiji.	
70	Australia	Sydney	22–25 May	Official visit	See also: Australia–India relations	
71	United Nations United States	New York City, Washington, D.C.	20–23 June	State visit	See also: India and the United Nations and India–United States relations Details Prime Minister Modi oversaw a cultural program at the United Nations in New York City to commemorate International Yoga Day. In Washington, D.C. and paid his first official State visit to the United States. He also separately met various other US business and tech leaders. Prime Minister Modi addressed a joint session of the United States Congress becoming the first Indian Prime Minister and sixth world leader in history to address the US Congress twice. Later in the evening, he was hosted by President Joe Biden and First Lady Jill Biden at the White House for a State dinner.	
71	Egypt	Cairo	24–25 June	State visit	See also: Egypt–India relations Details Prime Minister Modi paid a state visit to Egypt on the invitation of the Egyptian President Abdel Fattah el-Sisi and received Order of the Nile, the highest civilian honour of Egypt.	
72	France	Paris	13–15 July	Official visit, Bastille Day military parade	See also: France–India relations Details Prime Minister Modi attended the Bastille Day military parade as the chief guest and received Legion of Honour, the highest civilian honour of France.	
72	United Arab Emirates	Abu Dhabi	15 July	Official visit	See also: India–United Arab Emirates relations	
73	South Africa	Johannesburg	22–24 August	15th BRICS summit	See also: India–South Africa relations	
73	Greece	Athens	25 August	Official visit	See also: Greece–India relations Details Prime Minister Modi paid an official visit to Greece on the invitation of the Greek Prime Minister Kyriakos Mitsotakis and received Order of Honour, the second-highest civilian honour of Greece.	
74	Indonesia	Jakarta	6–7 September	18th East Asia summit, 20th ASEAN–India summit	See also: India–Indonesia relations	
75	United NationsUnited Arab Emirates	Dubai	30 November–1 December	2023 United Nations Climate Change Conference (COP28)	See also: India and the United Nations and India–United Arab Emirates relations	

== 2024 ==
	Country	Areas visited	Date(s)	Purpose	Notes	Images
76	United Arab Emirates	Abu Dhabi	13–14 February	Inauguration of BAPS Hindu Mandir and several key agreements between India and the United Arab Emirates, participated in Ahlan Modi community event.	See also: India–United Arab Emirates relations	
76	Qatar	Doha	14–15 February	Official visit	See also: India–Qatar relations	
77	Bhutan	Paro, Thimphu	22–23 March	State visit	See also: Bhutan–India relations Details Prime Minister Modi paid a state visit to Bhutan on the invitation of the Bhutanese Prime Minister Tshering Tobgay and received Order of the Dragon King, the highest civilian honour of Bhutan.	
78	Italy	Fasano	13–14 June	50th G7 summit	See also: India–Italy relations	
79	Russia	Moscow	8–9 July	22nd India–Russia annual summit	See also: India–Russia relations Details Prime Minister Modi was awarded the Order of St. Andrew by President Vladimir Putin. He also laid a wreath at the Tomb of the Unknown Soldier in Moscow, and announced the opening of two new Indian consulates in Russia, in the cities of Kazan and Yekaterinburg.	
79	Austria	Vienna	9–10 July	Official visit	See also: Austria–India relations Details First visit by an Indian Prime Minister to Austria in 41 years.	
80	Poland	Warsaw	21–22 August	Official visit	See also: India–Poland relations Details Prime Minister Modi met with the Prime Minister of Poland Donald Tusk and President of Poland Andrzej Duda. During the visit, he paid tribute at the Tomb of the Unknown Soldier in Warsaw and met with several prominent Polish Indologists and business leaders. The bilateral relationship between India and Poland was elevated to the level of a Strategic Partnership. This was the first visit by an Indian Prime Minister to Poland in 45 years.	
80	Ukraine	Kyiv	22–23 August	Official visit	See also: India–Ukraine relations Details Prime Minister Modi met with the President of Ukraine Volodymyr Zelenskyy. He also visited the National Museum of the History of Ukraine, paid homage to Mahatma Gandhi at his statue in Kyiv, interacted with Ukrainian students learning the Hindi language, and donated humanitarian aid to the Ukrainian government on behalf of India in view of the ongoing Russo-Ukrainian war. This was the first visit by an Indian Prime Minister to Ukraine since its independence in 1991 and the establishment of India–Ukraine diplomatic relations in 1992.	
81	Brunei	Bandar Seri Begawan	3–4 September	Official visit	See also: Brunei–India relations Details Prime Minister Modi met with the Sultan and Prime Minister of Brunei Hassanal Bolkiah. During the visit, he also inaugurated the new Chancery premises of the Indian High Commission, interacted with the Indian diaspora, and visited the Omar Ali Saifuddien Mosque. This was the first bilateral visit by an Indian Prime Minister to Brunei.	
81	Singapore	Singapore	4–5 September	Official visit	See also: India–Singapore relations Details Prime Minister Modi met with the Prime Minister of Singapore Lawrence Wong, President of Singapore Tharman Shanmugaratnam, Senior Minister of Singapore and former Prime Minister Lee Hsien Loong and Emeritus Senior Minister Goh Chok Tong. He also visited AEM Singapore, a leading semiconductor and electronics company, interacted with prominent Singaporean investors and business leaders, and announced the establishment of a first-of-its-kind Thiruvalluvar Cultural Center in Singapore. The India-Singapore bilateral relationship was elevated to a Comprehensive Strategic Partnership.	
82	United Nations; United States	New York City, Wilmington	21–24 September	6th Quad leaders' summit, United Nations Summit of the Future	See also: India and the United Nations and India–United States relations Details Prime Minister Modi attended the Quad leaders' summit on September 21 in Wilmington, Delaware. On September 22, he addressed a gathering of Indian Americans at the Nassau Coliseum and interacted with business leaders and CEOs of leading US-based companies. On September 23, he addressed the Summit of the Future at the United Nations General Assembly, as well as held bilateral meetings with several world leaders on its sidelines.	
83	Laos	Vientiane	10–11 October	19th East Asia summit, 21st ASEAN–India summit	See also: India–Laos relations	
84	Russia	Kazan	22–23 October	16th BRICS summit	See also: India–Russia relations	
85	Nigeria	Abuja	16–17 November	State visit	See also: India–Nigeria relations	
85	Brazil	Rio de Janeiro	18–19 November	2024 G20 Rio de Janeiro summit	See also: Brazil–India relations	
85	Guyana	Georgetown	19–22 November	State visit, 2nd India–Caribbean summit	See also: Guyana–India relations	
86	Kuwait	Kuwait City	21–22 December	Official visit	See also: India–Kuwait relations Details First visit by an Indian Prime Minister in 43 years. The India-Kuwait bilateral relationship was elevated to the level of a Strategic Partnership. Prime Minister Modi was conferred the Order of Mubarak the Great by the Emir of Kuwait.	

== 2025 ==
	Country	Areas visited	Date(s)	Purpose	Notes	Images
87	France	Paris, Marseille, Saint-Paul-lès-Durance	10–12 February	State visit, co-chairing the 3rd AI summit	See also: France–India relations Details Prime Minister Modi paid a state visit to France, during which he co-chaired the AI Action Summit in Paris along with French President Emmanuel Macron. The two leaders then travelled to Marseille and inaugurated the new Indian consulate and paid homage at the Mazargues Cemetery to Indian soldiers who fought during World War I. The leaders also visited the ITER (International Thermonuclear Experimental Reactor) in Saint-Paul-lès-Durance, a project in which India is a stakeholder.	
87	United States	Washington D.C.	12–14 February	Working visit	See also: India–United States relations Details Prime Minister Modi met with United States President Donald Trump at the White House, becoming the fourth leader to do so since President Trump took office on January 20, after Israeli Prime Minister Benjamin Netanyahu, Japanese Prime Minister Shigeru Ishiba and the King of Jordan Abdullah II. Prime Minister Modi also separately met with other US officials and prominent personalities, including Director of National Intelligence Tulsi Gabbard, United States National Security Advisor Mike Waltz, businessmen Elon Musk and Vivek Ramaswamy.	
88	Mauritius	Port Louis	11–12 March	Mauritius National Day celebrations	See also: India–Mauritius relations Details Prime Minister Modi attended the Mauritius National Day celebrations as the chief guest. This was the second time he did so, having previously attended in 2015.	
89	Thailand	Bangkok	3–4 April	6th BIMSTEC summit	See also: India–Thailand relations Details The India-Thailand bilateral relationship was elevated to a Strategic Partnership. Prime Minister Modi also proposed a 21-point Action Plan for BIMSTEC covering a wide range of sectors including establishment of a BIMSTEC Chamber of Commerce, establishment of a Home Ministers' Mechanism, cooperation in space and satellite development, training of BIMSTEC diplomats in India, scholarships for BIMSTEC students to study in India, operationalization of the BIMSTEC Energy Centre in Bengaluru, and the organization of the first BIMSTEC Games in 2027.	
89	Sri Lanka	Colombo, Anuradhapura	4–6 April	State visit	See also: India–Sri Lanka relations Details Prime Minister Modi was the first foreign leader hosted by President Anura Kumara Dissanayake since taking office (whose first foreign trip as President was also to India in December 2024.)	
90	Saudi Arabia	Jeddah	22 April	Official visit	See also: India–Saudi Arabia relations Details First visit by Prime Minister Modi to Saudi Arabia in more than 5 years. Prime Minister Modi and Saudi Crown Prince Mohammed bin Salman co-chaired the 2nd meeting of the India–Saudi Arabia Strategic Partnership Council. This visit was originally scheduled for two days (22–23 April), but was cut short after Prime Minister Modi returned to India following the terrorist attack in Pahalgam.	
91	Cyprus	Nicosia, Limassol	15–16 June	Official visit	See also: Cyprus–India relations Details First visit by an Indian Prime Minister to Cyprus since 2002. Prime Minister Modi was awarded the Grand Cross of the Order of Makarios III by the President of Cyprus Nikos Christodoulides. The two leaders also visited the Green Line in Nicosia, the de facto border that separates Cyprus from Northern Cyprus, a self-declared state established following the 1974 Turkish invasion, and considered by the international community to be a territory of Cyprus under Turkish occupation.	
91	Canada	Kananaskis	16–17 June	51st G7 summit	See also: Canada–India relations Details Prime Minister Modi attended the G7 Summit after being invited by Canadian Prime Minister Mark Carney. Prime Minister Modi has been invited by the host country to every G7 Summit since 2019. This was his first visit to Canada in more than 10 years, and was seen as a key step in mending strained India–Canada relations. During the bilateral meeting between Prime Minister Modi and Prime Minister Carney, several steps were announced to normalize the relationship, including the reinstatement of High Commissioners and resumption of trade negotiations.	
91	Croatia	Zagreb	18–19 June	Official visit	See also: Croatia–India relations Details First visit by an Indian Prime Minister to Croatia.	
92	Ghana	Accra	2–3 July	Official visit	See also: Ghana-India relations Details First visit by an Indian Prime Minister to Ghana since 1995. Prime Minister Modi addressed the Parliament of Ghana.	
92	Trinidad and Tobago	Port of Spain, Couva	3–4 July	Official visit	See also: India–Trinidad and Tobago relations Details First visit by an Indian Prime Minister to Trinidad and Tobago since 2009 (and the first bilateral visit since 1999; the 2009 visit by Prime Minister Manmohan Singh was for the 21st CHOGM). Prime Minister Modi was the first foreign leader hosted by Trinidad and Tobago Prime Minister Kamla Persad-Bissessar since assuming office on 1 May. During the visit, Prime Minister Modi addressed a joint session of the Parliament of Trinidad and Tobago. He also addressed a diaspora event in Couva.	
92	Argentina	Buenos Aires	4–5 July	Official visit	See also: Argentina–India relations Details First bilateral visit by an Indian Prime Minister to Argentina since Prime Minister Indira Gandhi's visit in 1968.	
92	Brazil	Rio de Janeiro, Brasília	5–8 July	17th BRICS summit, State visit	See also: Brazil–India relations	
92	Namibia	Windhoek	9 July	State visit	See also: India–Namibia relations Details First visit by an Indian Prime Minister to Namibia since Prime Minister Atal Bihari Vajpayee's visit in 1998. During the visit, Prime Minister Modi addressed a joint session of the Parliament of Namibia.	
93	United Kingdom	London, Chequers, Sandringham	23–24 July	Official visit	See also: India–United Kingdom relations Details At Chequers, Prime Minister Modi and Prime Minister Keir Starmer signed the India–UK Free Trade Agreement. The two leaders also released a "Vision 2035" plan for the India–UK bilateral relationship, and interacted with prominent business leaders from both countries. Prime Minister Modi also met with King Charles III at Sandringham House.	
93	Maldives	Malé	25–26 July	State visit	See also: India–Maldives relations Details Prime Minister Modi was the Guest of Honour at the 60th Maldivian Independence Day celebrations. He was the first foreign leader hosted by President Mohamed Muizzu since taking office in November 2023.	
94	Japan	Tokyo, Sendai	28–30 August	India–Japan annual summit	See also: India–Japan relations Details During the visit, India is expected to sign a deal to acquire the under-development E10 Series Shinkansen to be used on the Mumbai-Ahmedabad high-speed rail corridor.	
94	China	Tianjin	31 August–1 September	2025 Tianjin SCO summit	See also: China–India relations	
95	Bhutan	Thimphu	11-12 November	Official visit	See also: Bhutan-India relations	
96	South Africa	Johannesburg	21–23 November	2025 G20 Johannesburg summit, 6th IBSA summit	See also: India–South Africa relations	
97	Jordan	Amman, Petra	15–16 December 2025	Official visit	See also: India–Jordan relations	
97	Ethiopia	Addis Ababa	16–17 December 2025	State visit	See also: Ethiopia–India relations	
97	Oman	Muscat	17–18 December 2025	Official visit	See also: India–Oman relations	

== 2026 ==
	Country	Areas visited	Date(s)	Purpose	Notes	Images
98	Malaysia	Kuala Lumpur, Putrajaya, Selangor	7–8 February	Official visit	See also: India–Malaysia relations	
99	Israel	Tel Aviv, Jerusalem	25–26 February	Official visit	See also: India–Israel relations	
100	United Arab Emirates	Abu Dhabi	15 May	Stop-over	See also: India–United Arab Emirates relations	
100	Netherlands	Amsterdam, The Hague	15–17 May	Official visit	See also: India–Netherlands relations	
100	Sweden	Gothenburg	17–18 May	Official visit	See also: India–Sweden relations	
100	Norway	Oslo	18–19 May	3rd India–Nordic summit	See also: India–Norway relations Details First visit by an Indian Prime Minister to Norway since Prime Minister Indira Gandhi's visit in 1983.	
100	Italy	Rome	19–20 May	Official visit	See also: India–Italy relations Details First bilateral visit on the invitation by the Italian Prime Minister Giorgia Meloni.	
101	France	Nice	13–14 June	Official visit	See also: France–India relations	
101	Slovakia	Bratislava	14–16 June	Official visit	See also: India–Slovakia relations Details First visit to Slovakia by an Indian prime minister.	
101	France	Évian-les-Bains, Paris	16–18 June	52nd G7 summit	See also: France–India relations	
102	Seychelles	Victoria	27–29 June	State visit	See also: India–Seychelles relations Details Attended Golden Jubilee Celebration of the National Day of Seychelles as the Guest of Honour by invitation of President Patrick Herminie.	
103	Indonesia	Jakarta, Yogyakarta	6–8 July	State visit	See also: India–Indonesia relations	
103	Australia	Melbourne	8–10 July	Official visit	See also: Australia–India relations	
103	New Zealand	Auckland	10–11 July	Official visit	See also: India–New Zealand relations	
104	Uzbekistan	Tashkent	29–30 August	State visit	See also: India–Uzbekistan relations	
104	Kyrgyzstan	Bishkek	31 August–1 September	2026 Bishkek SCO summit	See also: India–Kyrgyzstan relations	
105	Philippines	Metro Manila	16–18 November	21st East Asia summit, 23rd ASEAN–India summit, 7th Quad leaders' summit	See also: India–Philippines relations	

== Expected future trips ==
This is a list of international trips that Prime Minister Modi is expected to undertake in the near future, based either on official confirmation or on reliable media reports.

	Country	Areas visited	Date(s)	Purpose	Notes	Images
106	Canada	Ottawa	11–12 December	Working visit	See also: Canada–India relations	
106	United States	Miami	13–15 December	2026 G20 Miami summit	See also: India–United States relations	
106	European Union; Belgium	Brussels	16–17 December	Working visit	See also: India–European Union relations and Belgium–India relations	

== Multilateral meetings ==
Group	Year															
Group	2014	2015	2016	2017	2018	2019	2020	2021	2022	2023	2024	2025	2026	2027	2028	2029
Artificial Intelligence Summit										1–2 November, (Note: Minister of State for Electronics and Information Technology Rajeev Chandrashekhar attended in the Prime Minister's place.) (United Kingdom) Milton Keynes	21–22 May, (South Korea) Seoul	10–11 February, (France) Paris	16–20 February, (Note: These summits were hosted by India.) (India) New Delhi	TBA, (Switzerland) Geneva	TBA, (United Arab Emirates) United Arab Emirates	TBA
ASEM	16–17 October, (Note: Vice President Mohammad Hamid Ansari attended in the Prime Minister's place.) (Italy) Milan		15–16 July, (Mongolia) Ulaanbaatar		18–19 October, (Note: Vice President Venkaiah Naidu attended in the Prime Minister's place.) (Belgium) Brussels			25–26 November, (Note: These summits were held online due to the COVID-19 pandemic.) (Cambodia) Phnom Penh								
BIMSTEC	Office not entered				30–31 August, (Nepal) Kathmandu				30 March, (Sri Lanka) Colombo			2–4 April, (Thailand) Bangkok		TBA, (Bangladesh) Dhaka		
BRICS	14–16 July, (Brazil) Fortaleza	8–9 July, (Russia) Ufa	15–16 October, (India) Benaulim	3–5 September, (China) Xiamen	25–27 July, (South Africa) Johannesburg	13–14 November, (Brazil) Brasília	17 November, (Russia) Saint Petersburg	9 September, (India) New Delhi	27 June, (China) Beijing	22–24 August, (South Africa) Johannesburg	22–24 October, (Russia) Kazan	6–7 July, (Brazil) Rio de Janeiro	12–13 September, (India) New Delhi	TBA, China	TBA	TBA
CHOGM		27–29 November, (Note: Minister of External Affairs Sushma Swaraj attended in the Prime Minister's place.) (Malta) Valletta			18–20 April, (United Kingdom) London				24–25 June, (Note: Minister of State for External Affairs Meenakshi Lekhi attended in the Prime Minister's place.) (Rwanda) Kigali		25–26 October, (Note: Minister of Parliamentary Affairs Kiren Rijiju attended in prime minister's place.) (Samoa) Apia		1–4 November, (Note: Minister of External Affairs S. Jaishankar attended in the Prime Minister's place.) (Antigua and Barbuda) St. John's		TBA	
EAS-ASEAN	12–14 November, (Myanmar) Naypyidaw	21–22 November, (Malaysia) Kuala Lumpur	6–8 September, (Laos) Vientiane	13–14 November, (Philippines) Pasay	14–15 November, Singapore	2–4 November, (Thailand) Bangkok	14 November, (Vietnam) Hanoi	26–27 October, (Brunei) Bandar Seri Begawan	13–14 November, (Note: Vice President Jagdeep Dhankhar attended in the Prime Minister's place.) (Cambodia) Phnom Penh	5–7 September, (Indonesia) Jakarta	10–11 October, (Laos) Vientiane	26–28 October, (Malaysia) Kuala Lumpur	16–18 November, (Philippines) Pasay	TBA	TBA	TBA
FIPIC	19 November, (Fiji) Suva	21 August, (India) Jaipur								22 May, (Papua New Guinea) Port Moresby						
G-7	4–5 June, (Note: India was not a full member.) (European Union) (Belgium) Brussels	7–8 June, (Germany) Krün	26–27 May, (Japan) Shima	26–27 May, (Italy) Taormina	8–9 June, (Canada) La Malbaie	24–26 August, (France) Biarritz	~~10–12 June,~~; ~~(United States) Camp David~~ Cancelled	11–13 June, (United Kingdom) Carbis Bay	26–28 June, (Germany) Krün	19–21 May, (Japan) Hiroshima	13–14 June, (Italy) Fasano	16–17 June, (Canada) Kananaskis	15–17 June, (France) Évian-les-Bains	TBA, United States	TBA	TBA
G-20	15–16 November, (Australia) Brisbane	15–16 November, (Turkey) Antalya	4–5 September, (China) Hangzhou	7–8 July, (Germany) Hamburg	30 November–1 December, (Argentina) Buenos Aires	28–29 June, (Japan) Osaka	21–22 November, (Saudi Arabia) Riyadh	30–31 October, (Italy) Rome	15–16 November, (Indonesia) Nusa Dua	9–10 September, (India) New Delhi	18–19 November, (Brazil) Rio de Janeiro	22–23 November, (South Africa) Johannesburg	14–15 December, (United States) Miami	TBA, (United Kingdom) Manchester	TBA, South Korea	TBA
IAFS		29–30 October, (India) New Delhi											~~28–31 May,~~; ~~(India) New Delhi~~ Cancelled			
IEUS			30 March, (European Union) (Belgium) Brussels				15 July, (India) New Delhi	8 May, (European Union) (Portugal) Lisbon					17 January, (India) New Delhi	TBA	TBA	TBA
IORA				5–7 March, (Indonesia) Jakarta										TBA, (India) New Delhi		
India–Caribbean Summit						25 September, (United States) New York					19–21 November, (Guyana) Georgetown				TBA, (India) New Delhi	
India–Central Asia Summit										27 January, (India) New Delhi				TBA, (India) New Delhi		
India–Nordic Summit					16–18 April, (Sweden) Stockholm				3–4 May, (Denmark) Copenhagen				18–19 May, (Norway) Oslo			
NAM			13–18 September, (Venezuela) Porlamar			25–26 October, (Azerbaijan) Baku	4 May, (Azerbaijan) Baku	11–12 October, (Serbia) Belgrade			15–20 January, (Uganda) Kampala					TBA, (Uzbekistan) Tashkent
NSS	Office not entered		31 March–1 April, (United States) Washington, D.C.													
QUAD								24 March, (United States) Washington, D.C.	4 March, (United States) Washington, D.C.	20 May, (Japan) Hiroshima	21 September, (United States) Wilmington		17 November, (Philippines) Manila	TBA	TBA	TBA
QUAD								24 September, (United States) Washington, D.C.	24 May, (Japan) Tokyo	20 May, (Japan) Hiroshima	21 September, (United States) Wilmington		17 November, (Philippines) Manila	TBA	TBA	TBA
SAARC	26–27 November, (Nepal) Kathmandu		~~9–10 November,~~; ~~(Pakistan) Islamabad~~ Cancelled													
SCO	11–12 September, (Tajikistan) Dushanbe	9–10 July, (Russia) Ufa	23–24 June, (Uzbekistan) Tashkent	8–9 June, (Kazakhstan) Astana	7–8 June, (China) Qingdao	14–15 June, (Kyrgyzstan) Bishkek	10 November, (Russia) Saint Petersburg	16–17 September, (Tajikistan) Dushanbe	15–16 September, (Uzbekistan) Samarkand	4 July, (India) New Delhi	3–4 July, (Kazakhstan) Astana	31 August–1 September, (China) Tianjin	31 August–1 September (Kyrgyzstan) Bishkek	TBA (Pakistan) Islamabad	TBA	TBA
UNCCC	1–12 December, (Note: Minister of Environment, Forest and Climate Change Prakash Javadekar attended in the Prime Minister's place.) (United Nations) (Peru) Lima	30 November–12 December, (United Nations) (France) Paris	7–18 November, (Note: Minister of Environment, Forest and Climate Change Anil Madhav Dave attended in the Prime Minister's place.) (United Nations) (Morocco) Marrakesh	6–17 November, (Note: Minister of Environment, Forest and Climate Change Harsh Vardhan attended in the Prime Minister's place.) (United Nations) (Germany) Bonn	2–15 December, (United Nations) (Poland) Katowice	2–13 December, (United Nations) (Spain) Madrid		31 October–12 November, (United Nations) (United Kingdom) Glasgow	6–18 November, (Note: Minister of Environment, Forest and Climate Change Bhupender Yadav attended in the Prime Minister's place.) (United Nations) (Egypt) Sharm El Sheikh	30 November–12 December, (United Nations) (United Arab Emirates) Dubai	11–22 November, (Note: Minister of State for Environment, Forest and Climate Change Kirti Vardhan Singh attended in the Prime Minister's place.) (United Nations) (Azerbaijan) Baku	10–21 November, (United Nations) (Brazil) Belém	9–20 November, (United Nations) (Turkey) Antalya	TBA, (United Nations) (Ethiopia) Addis Ababa	TBA, (United Nations)	TBA, (United Nations)
UNGA	27 September, (United Nations) New York City	1 October, (United Nations) New York City	26 September, (United Nations) New York City	23 September, (United Nations) New York City	29 September, (United Nations) New York City	27 September, (United Nations) New York City	26 September, (United Nations) New York City	25 September, (United Nations) New York City	24 September, (United Nations) New York City	26 September, (United Nations) New York City	28 September, (United Nations) New York City	27 September, (United Nations) New York City	26 September, (United Nations) New York City	TBA, (United Nations) New York City	TBA, (United Nations) New York City	TBA, (United Nations) New York City
Others		G-4; 26 September, (United States) New York City							I2U2; 14 July, (Israel) Jerusalem			IBSA; 23 November, (South Africa) Johannesburg				
Did not attend Virtual event Future event No event held

== See also ==
- Premiership of Narendra Modi
- List of international trips made by prime ministers of India
- List of international presidential trips made by Ram Nath Kovind
- List of international presidential trips made by Droupadi Murmu
- List of international trips made by S. Jaishankar as Minister of External Affairs of India
- History of Indian foreign relations
