= India–Tajikistan relations =

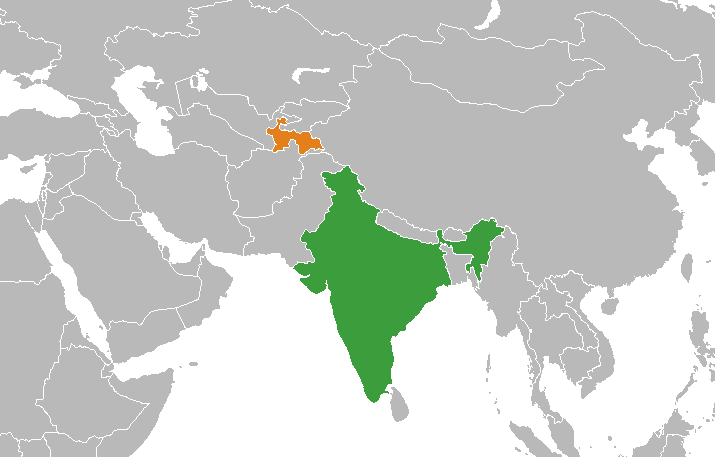

- India: Tajikistan

Diplomatic mission
- Embassy of India, Dushanbe: Embassy of Tajikistan, New Delhi

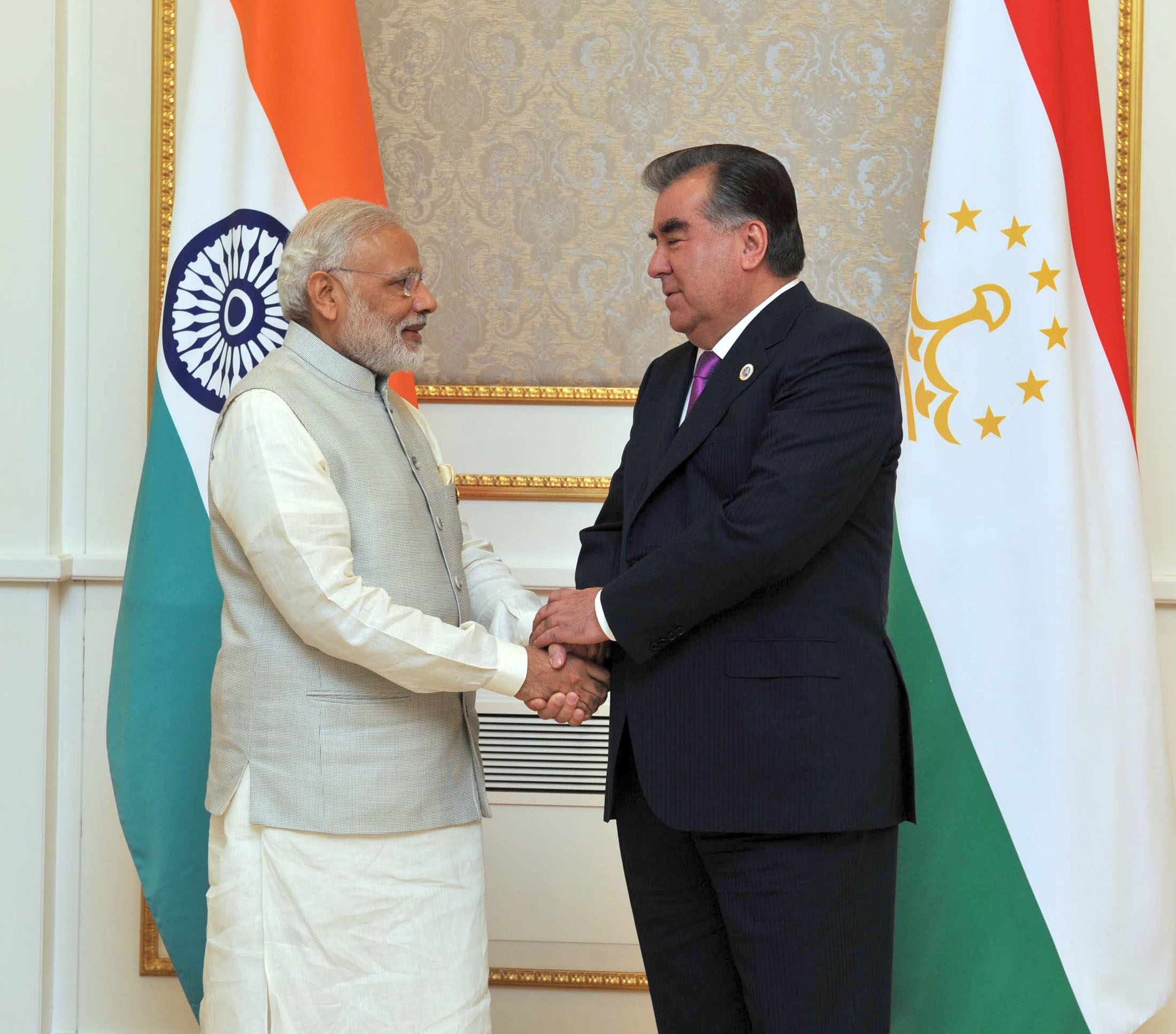
Indian prime minister Narendra Modi and Tajikistan president Emomali Rahmon.

The bilateral relations between India and Tajikistan have developed considerably owing to both nations' co-operation on security and strategic issues. India had set up its first overseas military base Farkhor in Tajikistan. India also assisted in building Ayni Hospital.

== Background ==
Diplomatic relations were established with Tajikistan's independence following the 1991 dissolution of the Soviet Union, which had been friendly with India. Tajikistan occupies a strategically important position in Central Asia, bordering Afghanistan, the People's Republic of China and separated by a small strip of Afghan territory called the Wakhan Corridor from Northern Pakistan. Both Russia and China have sought to cultivate ties with Tajikistan, which has also been seen as important in the war in Afghanistan against the Islamist Taliban and Al-Qaeda. India's role in fighting the Taliban and Al-Qaeda and its strategic rivalry with both China and Pakistan have made its ties with Tajikistan important to its strategic and security policies. Military presence in Tajikistan and its neighbouring Central Asian Republics has been coveted by the United States, Russia and China apart from India.

== Bilateral cooperation ==
Despite their common efforts, bilateral trade has been comparatively low, valued at US$42.33 million in 2016-17 increased from US$12.09 million in 2005; India's exports to Tajikistan were valued at US$6.2 million and its imports at US$5.89 million. To expand economic co-operation and trade, Tajikistan and India established an inter-governmental commission on trade, economic, scientific and technical co-operation and have encouraged investment and trade in hydroelectricity, transport, mining, food processing, construction and tourism. India has also offered to repair and modernise the Varzob-1 hydroelectric power plant. In 2006, the President of Tajikistan Emomali Rakhmanov made an official visit to India that resulted in bolstered efforts to expand trade and cooperation on anti-terrorism issues.

=== Bilateral Trade ===
Trade Value in US$ Million												
	2005–06	2006–07	2007–08	2008–09	2009–10	2010–11	2011–12	2012–13	2013–14	2014–15	2015–16	2016–17
Total Trade	12.13	15.50	22.21	34.18	32.56	41.33	30.14	48.02	55.13	58.1	32.24	42.33
Exports from India to Tajikistan	6.24	7.45	12.40	16.71	15.71	18.31	21.28	35.16	54.27	53.71	22.26	20.51
Imports to India from Tajikistan	5.89	8.05	9.81	17.47	16.85	23.02	8.86	12.86	0.86	4.39	9.98	21.82
Ministry of Commerce & Industry, India as of August 2017

The major items of India's exports are pharmaceuticals, tea, coffee, chemicals, textiles/clothing/apparel and machinery and the major imports are aluminium, cotton, dry fruits, vegetables and organic chemicals. The Trade between the countries is not very significant due to the inaccessibility of the country. Currently all trade between India and Tajikistan is done by sea from India to the port of Bandar Abbas in Iran and then by road through Turkmenistan and Uzbekistan that everything becomes expensive for India huge revenue lost in transportation.

== ITEC Assistance ==
As a lesser developed country, and one of the poorest nations in the world, Tajikistan is one of the largest beneficiaries of the Indian Technical and Economic Cooperation Programme (ITEC) programme. Till date, 381 Tajik personnel have been trained under the ITEC scheme. Similarly, 160 students have received Government of India scholarships for higher studies. So far, 35 Tajik military cadets and 67 young officers have undergone training at National Defence Academy in Pune, Indian Military Academy in Dehradun and other training establishments. The first batch of Tajik officers graduating out of NDA and IMA returned to Tajikistan in June 2007 and were inducted into the Tajik Defence forces.

== Strategic and military ties ==
India's military presence and activities have been significant, beginning with India's extensive support to the anti-Taliban Afghan Northern Alliance (ANA). In 2002, India built a hospital at the Farkhor Air Base, located 60 km from the Afghan border, to treat wounded ANA fighters; the leader of the ANA Ahmed Shah Massoud had been rushed there after the fatal attack on his life on 10 September 2001. After the United States declined Tajikistan's offer to use the base, the Indian government began talks over using the base, and the then-Indian Prime Minister Atal Bihari Vajpayee signed an agreement with the Tajik president Emomali Rahmon to that effect on 14 November 2003. India began renovating the base and stationed aircraft of the Indian Air Force there. The use of the base was speculated to include the acquisition of military and energy assets from the former Soviet republics of Central Asia, given India's primary reliance on Soviet/Russian weaponry. India also sees the base providing access to the oil and energy resources of Central Asia. India also promised to aid in Tajikistan's defence and is providing training to the Tajikistan Air Force. Indian presence at Farkhor has been objected to by Pakistan, which sees it as a threat. The Farkhor Air Base became fully operational in 2006, and 12 MiG-29 fighters and trainer aircraft are planned to be stationed there. The lease for Ayni air base expired in 2022 and Tajikistan refused to renew the lease, which led to the withdrawal of Indian forces. India is the fourth nation after the US, Russia and Germany to have a military base in Central Asia. India has established a military hospital in southern Tajikistan. The hospital with capacity of 50 beds will treat military personnel as well as civilians.

== Cultural ties ==
Hindi films are the most popular foreign films in Tajikistan. Hindi & Urdu departments are very large in the country's universities.

== See also ==
- Republic of India
- India–Kazakhstan Relations
- India–Kyrgyzstan Relations
- India–Tanzania Relations
- India–Uzbekistan Relations
