= India–Kyrgyzstan relations =

- India: Kyrgyzstan

India–Kyrgyzstan relations or the Indo–Kyrgyz relations are the bilateral relations between the Republic of India and the Kyrgyz Republic. Since the independence of Kyrgyzstan on 31 August 1991, India was among the first to establish diplomatic relations in 1992; the resident Mission of India was set up in 1994.

Former Prime Minister Rajiv Gandhi visited Bishkek and Issyk Kul Lake in 1985.

== History ==
Historically, India has had close contacts with Central Asia, especially countries which were part of the ancient Silk Route, including Kyrgyzstan. Parts of what are now India and Kyrgyzstan have been ruled and settled by Tibetans, Muslims and the Mongols.

== Relations ==
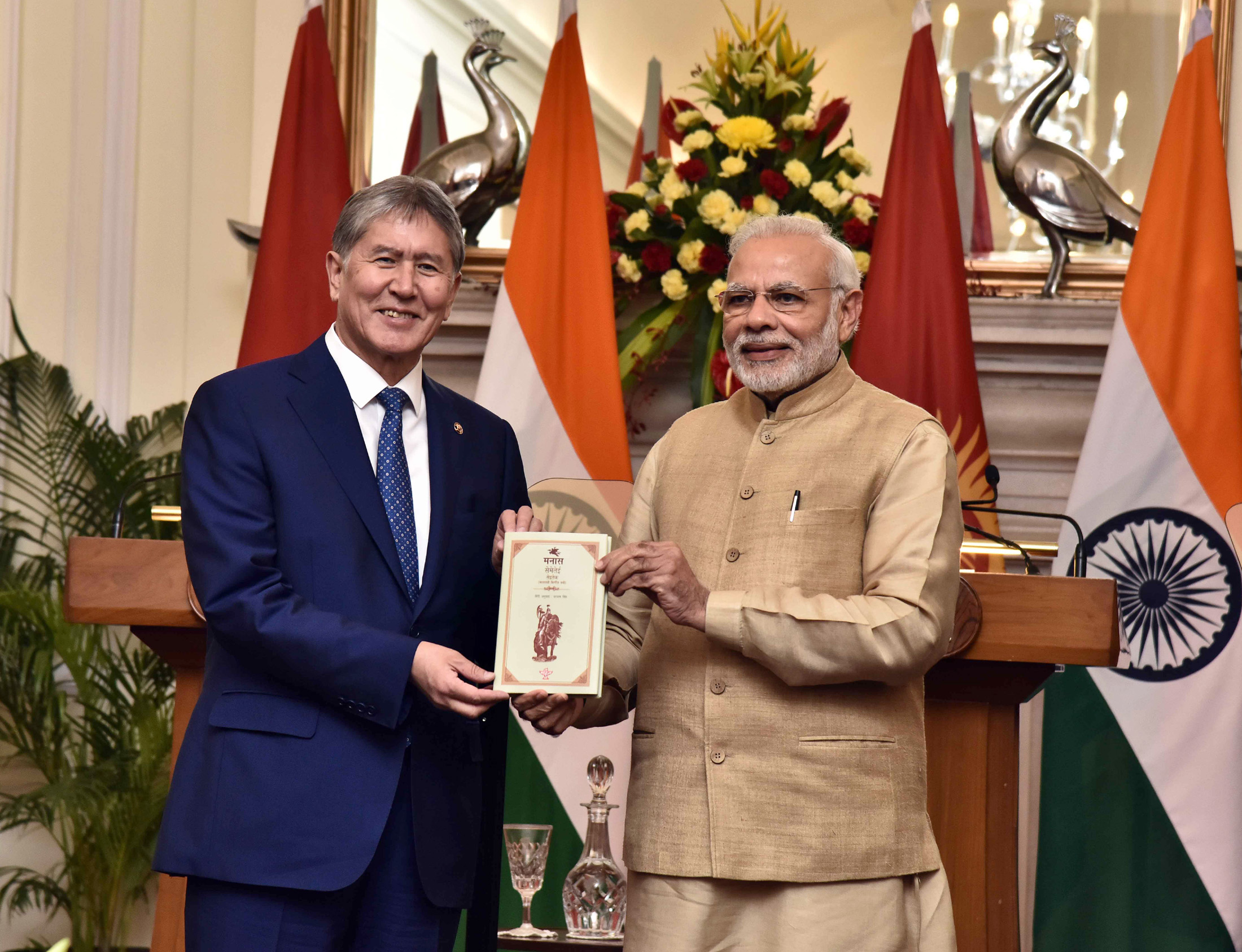
President Almazbek Atambayev presents a copy of Manas-Semetei-Seitek to Indian Prime Minister Shri Narendra Modi.

Political ties with the Kyrgyz Republic have been traditionally warm and friendly. Kyrgyzstan also supports India's bid for a permanent seat at the United Nations Security Council and India's full membership in the Shanghai Cooperation Organization (SCO).

Both countries share common concerns on threat of terrorism, extremism and drug trafficking. Since the establishment of diplomatic relations in 1992, the two countries have signed several framework agreements, including on culture, trade and economic cooperation.

The Indo-Kyrgyz diplomatic relations reached its 20th year in 2012. India announced its Connect Central Asia Policy during the Sri E. Ahamed's visit to Kyrgyzstan from 10 to 13 June 2012, with the first India-Central Asia Track-II Dialogue held in Bishkek. In his inaugural address, the Indian Minister of External Affairs declared India's intention to establish e-Network in Central Asia to promote tele-medicine and tele-education. During the visit, he met Kyrgyz Prime Minister Ömürbek Babanov and held bilateral talks with the Kyrgyz Foreign Minister Ruslan Kazakbayev.

Indian Minister of External Affairs Salman Khurshid visited Kyrgyzstan on 12 and 13 September 2013. On 12 September, he met with the Kyrgyz Minister of Foreign Affairs Erlan Abdyldaev and called on President Atambaev as bilateral component of his visit and thereafter he participated in the SCO Summit. On the sidelines of the SCO Summit, EAM had bilateral meetings with the Iranian President Hassan Rouhani, Mongolian President Tsakhiagiin Elbegdorj, and SCO Secretary General Mazentsev.

== High-level visits ==
=== From India ===
Prime Minister P. V. Narasimha Rao visited Kyrgyzstan in September 1995, and a year later Vice President K. R. Narayanan made a visit to Kyrgyzstan. Vice President Krishan Kant made a visit in August 1999. Narendra Modi visited Kyrgyzstan on 11 and 12 July 2015, and held meetings with Kyrgyz politicians Almazbek Atambayev, Asylbek Jeenbekov and Temir Sariyev.

=== From Kyrgyzstan ===
Vice Prime Minister Mira Jangavacheva visited India in March 1997, and two months later, Prime Minister Apas Jumagulov made a visit to India. President Askar Akayev has visited India four times: once in March 1992, once in April 1999, once in August 2002, and once in November 2003. First Deputy Prime Minister Joomart Otorbayev made a visit to India in May 2013.

== Parliamentary exchanges ==
A Parliamentary delegation led by Usup Mukambaev, the then Chairman of the Legislative Assembly of the Kyrgyz Parliament, visited India from 25 July to 1 August 1997. The four-member group of the Kyrgyz Parliamentarians visited India in February 1999 to study the Indian experiences in infrastructure and agricultural sectors.

== Trade ==
India-Kyrgyz trade was US$38.53 million between 2014 and 2015. India's exports to Kyrgyzstan was US$37.76 million whereas Kyrgyz exports to India was US$0.77 million. Apparel and clothing, leather goods, drugs and pharmaceuticals, fine chemicals, and tea are some of the important items in India's export basket to Kyrgyzstan. Kyrgyz exports to India consist of raw hides, metalifers ores, and metal scrap.

== Financial assistance ==
In 1995, India extended a US$5 million line of credit to Kyrgyzstan; out of this, US$2.78 million were disbursed for four projects: a plant for manufacturing toothbrushes, a polythene bag manufacturing plant, a toothpaste production plant, and a pharmaceutical plant. Kyrgyzstan repaid US$1.66 million and the balance amount was converted to grant.

== Education and culture ==
An Agreement on Cooperation in the spheres of culture was recently signed during the visit of PM Modi in July 2015 to replace the agreement on Culture, arts, education, science, mass-media and sports of 18 March 1992. In general, there is appreciation of Indian culture. The Centre for Indian Studies set up in Osh State University in 1997 has been useful in providing an exposure to Indian culture and civilization to academicians and intelligentsia in this country. The chair has been discontinued since 2010 unrest in Osh. Two workshops of Kathak dance were conducted one each in Bishkek (January 2014) and Issyk-kul (July 2014). A 10-member Bhangra Dance group “Bhola Panchi”, sponsored by ICCR, performed in Bishkek on 18 October and in Kara-Balta on 19 October 2014. An India Study Centre was established by the Mission in the prestigious National Library of Kyrgyzstan in Bishkek and inaugurated on 14 November 2014. A seven-member Sitar (Fusion) group led by Pandit Prateek Chaudhuri, sponsored by ICCR, performed in Bishkek and Osh on 28–29 March 2015 respectively. A renowned Indian musician Shri Dhruba Ghosh, Principal of Bhartiya Vidya Bhavan, Mumbai, performed in Bishkek along with a Central Asian Orchestra on 5 August 2015. A troupe, Natya STEM Dance Kampani, sponsored by ICCR performed in the most prestigious Kyrgyz National Philharmony Hall on 20 October 2015.

== Indians in Kyrgyzstan ==
About 16,000 Indian students are studying medicine in various medical institutions across the country. A few businessmen are engaged in trade and services in Kyrgyzstan. Many Indian restaurants have also opened across Bishkek as a result of the growing Indian diaspora. Other Indian influence in Kyrgyzstan include the growing popularity of Indian music, yoga and Bollywood.

A handful of Indians in Kyrgyzstan are of Northeast Indian origin, due to the similar cultural, culinary and genetic ties they share with the Kyrgyz population.

== See also ==
- Republic of India
- India–Mongolia Relations
- India–Kazakhstan Relations
- India–Tanzania Relations
- India–Tajikistan Relations
- India–Uzbekistan Relations
- Foreign relations of India
- Foreign relations of Kyrgyzstan
