= List of ambassadors of Kazakhstan to India =

Coordinates: 28.560477°N 77.159102°E

Nurlan A. Zhalgasbayev

Kazakhstan Ambassador to India
- Incumbent
- Assumed office 19 March 2019
- President: Kassym-Jomart Tokayev
- Preceded by: Bulat Sergazyuly Sarsenbayev

This is a list of ambassadors of Kazakhstan to India.

The first new Embassy of India in Central Asia was opened in 1992 in Kazakhstan's former capital city, Almaty, then it was relocated to the nation's new capital city, Astana, in 1997. The Embassy of Kazakhstan was opened in India's capital, New Delhi, in 1993.

== List of representatives ==
Diplomatic agrément/Diplomatic accreditation	Ambassador	Russian language ru:Послы Казахстана в России	Observations	Prime Minister of Kazakhstan	List of prime ministers of India	Term end
May 1995	Rashid Turarovich Ibraev	ru:Ибраев, Рашид Турарович	1998: Kazakhstan's ambassador to Azerbai jan. Rashid Ibrayev,	Akezhan Kazhegeldin	P. V. Narasimha Rao	August 1998
August 1998	Askar Shakirov	Шакиров Аскар		Nurlan Balgimbayev	Atal Bihari Vajpayee	August 27, 2004
August 27, 2004	Kairat Umarov	ru:Умаров, Кайрат Ермекович	Qayrat Omarow	Daniyal Akhmetov	Manmohan Singh	September 9, 2009
May 11, 2010	Doulat Kuanyshev	Куанышев Дулат	(born 29.10.1960) 05.2003-09.2005 ambassador to Paris	Karim Massimov	Manmohan Singh	September 2014
October 6, 2014	Bulat Sergazyuly Sarsenbayev	ru:Сарсенбаев, Булат Сергазиевич		Serik Akhmetov	Narendra Modi	April 19, 2021
April 19, 2021	Nurlan A. Zhalgasbayev					Narendra Modi

== See also ==
- India–Kazakhstan relations
