= India–Jordan relations =

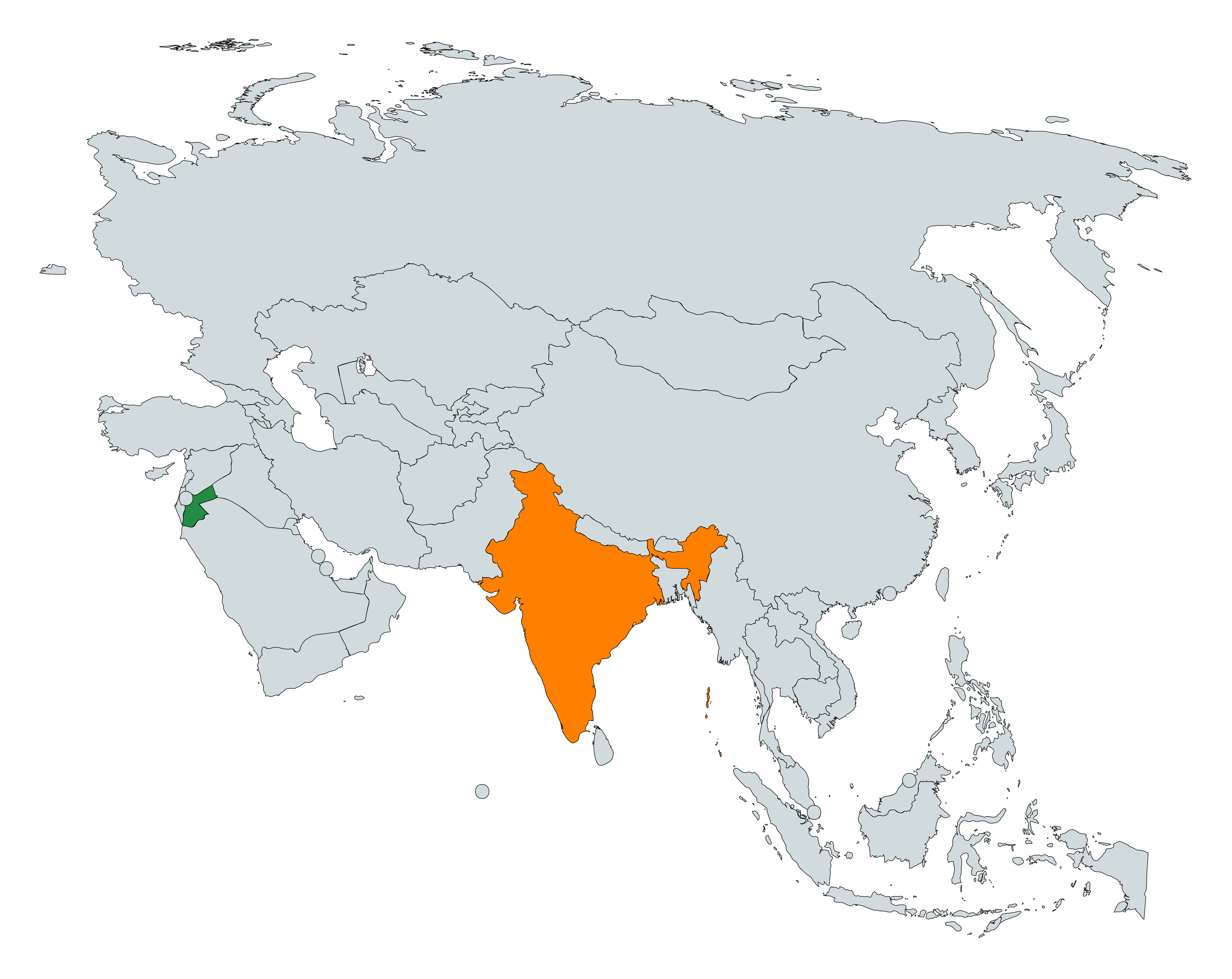

- Jordan: India

Diplomatic mission
- Embassy of Jordan, New Delhi, India: Embassy of India, Amman, Jordan

Envoy
- Jordanian Ambassador to India Thamer Al-Adwan: Indian Ambassador to Jordan Anwar Haleem

The Republic of India and the Hashemite Kingdom of Jordan signed their first bilateral agreement for cooperation and friendly relations in 1947. The agreement was formalized in 1950, when India became a republic, and full diplomatic relations were established between the two countries.

Several high level visits between the countries have taken place. King Hussein visited India in December 1963. Indian Vice-President Zakir Husain visited Jordan in May 1965 and offered prayers at the Al-Aqsa Mosque, which was under Jordanian control at the time. King Abdullah II bin Al-Hussein and Queen Rania visited India in December 2006. Indian Foreign Minister S. M. Krishna visited Jordan on 20 November 2011. Prince Hassan bin Talal paid visited the country during October–November 2012. Indian Prime Minister Narendra Modi met with King Abdullah on the sidelines of the UN general assembly in New York in September 2015.

Queen Rania expressed her views on bilateral relations between the two countries in a March 2006 interview with India Today. Rania described India as the "rising star of Asia" and Jordan's "natural partner". On India's role in the Middle East, she stated that the region "yearns for India to play a greater role", adding, "India has an important role because you have always had contact with us and understand our sensitivities." Jordan supported India's candidature for a non-permanent seat in the UN Security Council for the term 2011–12, and India supported to Jordan's candidature for the seat for the term 2014–16.

In October 2015, Pranab Mukherjee became the first Indian President to visit Jordan. Mukherjee met with King Abdullah, Prime Minister Abdullah Ensour and several other senior officials during the visit. During Mukherjee's six-day visit agreements/MoUs were signed between the two countries on a cultural exchange programme (2015–17) and maritime transport. Bilateral agreements/MoUs were also signed between the Bureau of Indian Standards and Jordan Standards and Metrology Organization, the Foreign Service Institute of India and Jordan Institute of Diplomacy, and 10 MOUs for educational cooperation were signed between the Indian and Jordanian Universities and Institutes. The two countries also agreed to enhance their counter-terrorism co-operation. King Abdullah also assured President Mukherjee that Jordan supported India's candidature for a permanent seat in a reformed UN Security Council.

Fayez Tarawneh, Chief of the Royal Hashemite Court of Jordan, visited India in March 2017. He held discussions with Prime Minister Modi.

On his second visit to India, King Abdullah II bin Al-Hussien of Jordan reached the country for a three-day visit starting from 27 February 2018 to participate in a CEO roundtable organised by the India-Jordan Business Forum and met his counterpart Narendra Modi, signing MoUs and agreements in diverse areas of bilateral cooperation. He also visited IIT Delhi to explore collaboration with Jordan technical institutes.

== Economic relations ==
India is Jordan's 4th largest trade partner after Iraq, Saudi Arabia and China. Trade between India and Jordan is governed by a 1976 bilateral agreement. Bilateral trade between the two countries totaled US$2.228 billion in 2014–15, which was $12 million more than the previous fiscal. India exported $1.431 billion worth of goods to Jordan, and imported $857 million. Since the 2012-13 fiscal, the balance of trade has been in favour of India. The main commodities exported by India to Jordan are electrical machinery, cereals, frozen meat, organic and inorganic chemicals, animal fodders, engineering and automotive parts.

Trade is expected to reach $5 billion by 2025.

Jordan Phosphate Mines Company (JPMC) and the Indian Farmers Fertiliser Cooperative (IFFCO) established a joint venture company for manufacturing Phosphoric Acid in Eshidiyawas in October 2015. The MMTC India Ltd signed an MOU with the JPMC on cooperation in the fertilizer sector in June 2015.

As of January 2016, Indians owned around 25 textile mills in Qualified Industrial Zones (QIZs) in Jordan at a total investment of $300 million. These mills employ over 10,000 people.

== Cultural relations ==
A portion of the Saddzagloul Street in Amman was renamed as Mahatma Gandhi Street on 11 October 2015.

As of August 2023, over 17,000 Indians reside in Jordan.

== Indian Embassy ==
The Indian embassy is located in Amman.

- Ambassador Anwar Haleem

== Jordan Embassy ==
The Jordan embassy is located in New Delhi.

- Ambassador Thamer Al-Adwan
