= India–South Africa relations =

- India: South Africa

The bilateral relations between the Republic of India and the Republic of South Africa have grown strong since the end of apartheid in South Africa in 1994. Both countries have since developed close strategic, cultural and economic ties. Both are former British colonies and full member states of the Commonwealth of Nations as republics.

India and South Africa also share an extensive energy partnership. In 2010, India imported 1.4 million tonnes of South African coal in February, making it the largest purchaser of coal from the country. Ties were further solidified with South Africa's 2011 acceptance into the BRICS group.

== Background ==
There is a major resident Indian community in South Africa. Mohandas Karamchand Gandhi (more commonly known as Mahatma Gandhi) had commenced his political-legal career in South Africa, experimenting with civil disobedience in the 1890s and 1900s, to improve the quality of living of the Indians living there. A statue to him was unveiled in Pietermaritzburg by Saurav Ganguly, the captain of the Indian national cricket team during the 2003 Cricket World Cup.

Indians also contributed to the African National Congress's struggle against the Apartheid regime. The Indian government was an outspoken critic of the apartheid-era South African government, refusing to maintain diplomatic relations. India's support evoked goodwill in South Africa and other African countries.

South African Minister for Human Settlement Lindiwe Sisulu during a visit to Delhi said "India is our closest ally in the Asian continent" also added "The purpose of this visit is a gesture from the South African government to thank its Indian counterpart for all the help and support it has extended in our struggle for liberation". Both countries established diplomatic relations after the end of apartheid in 1994.

South African President Nelson Mandela was awarded the Mahatma Gandhi Peace Prize and Bharat Ratna by the Indian government. Both nations have also promoted sporting ties, with the Indian national cricket team and the South Africa national cricket team frequently exchanging visits and participating in cricket tournaments hosted by either country.

== Economic ties ==
Bilateral trade grew exponentially from US$3 million in 1992–1993 to $4 billion in 2005–2006, and the two governments have targeted increasing bilateral trade to $12 billion by 2010. Gold bullion constitute one-third of India's imports from South Africa, while India polishes and processes diamonds from South African mines. South Africa has promoted signing a free trade agreement with India and the Southern Africa Customs Union (SACU), which includes Botswana, Lesotho, Namibia and Eswatini along with South Africa.

Bharti Airtel was scheduled to acquire MTN to make one of the world's largest telecommunications companies, and also touted as step in South-South cooperation. The deal was, however, rejected by the South African government of Jacob Zuma on the grounds that MTN would not be as South African anymore amid concerns of dual-listing on the Indian and South African stock exchanges.

== Cultural relations ==
=== Sports ===
Cricket is a major sport played in both countries, with the two often competing at the international level. The Indian game kho kho is also played to some extent in South Africa, having been brought over by the Indian diaspora.

== Military ties ==
India and South Africa have also developed military cooperation, trading arms and joint exercises like IBSAMAR, started in 2008 between India, Brazil, and South Africa and programs to train forces. Some analysts have argued that while there are some strategic commonalities between India and South Africa, this has not always translated into common perspectives.

== IBSA ==
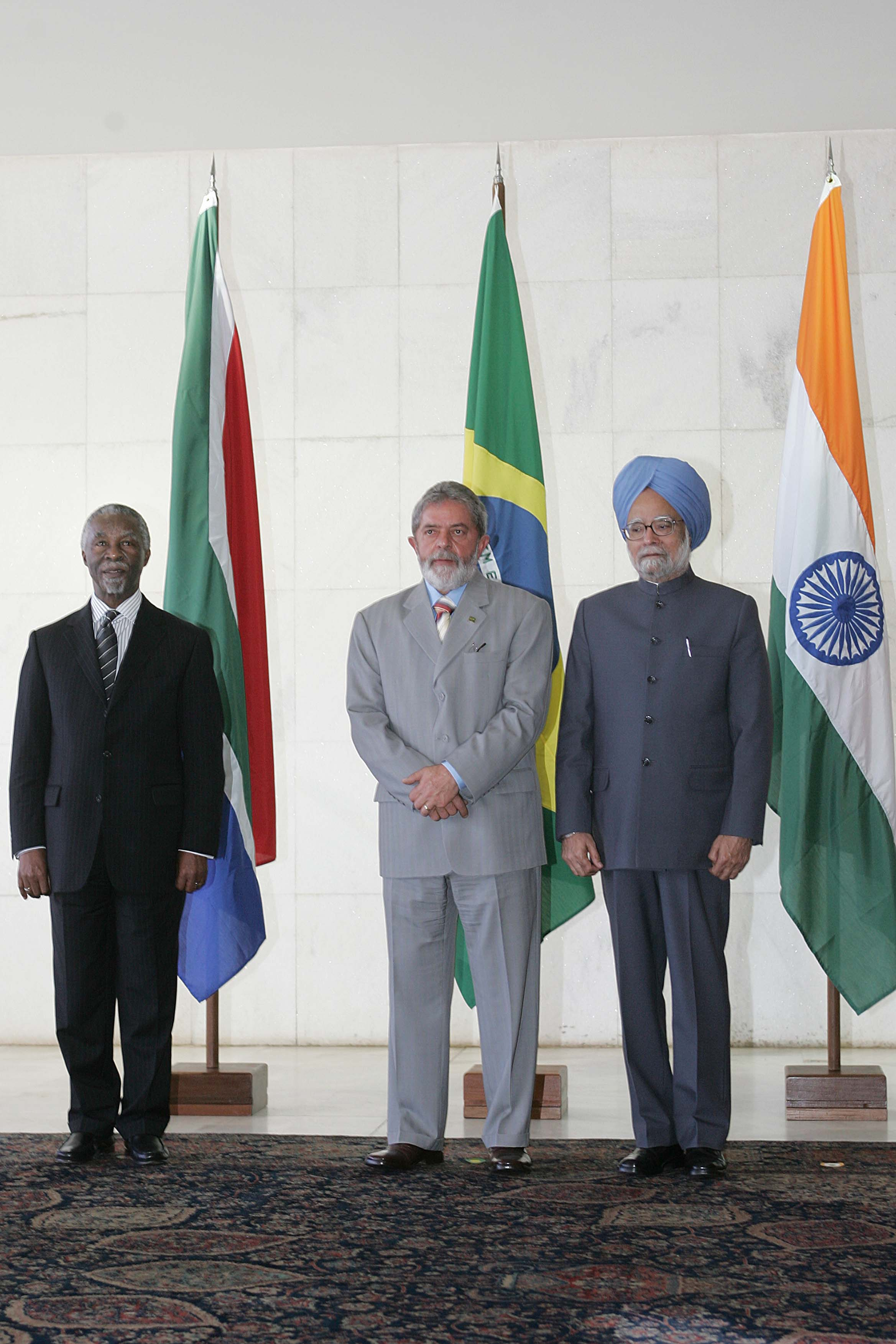
Indian PM Manmohan Singh with Brazilian President Luiz Inácio Lula da Silva and South African President Thabo Mbeki.

On June 6, 2003 India and South Africa signed an agreement with Brazil, known as the Brasília Declaration, establishing "South-South" cooperation, based on the premise of the three nations being regional powers of South Asia, Southern Africa and South America. The declaration called for extensive tripartite cooperation on strategic, commercial and cultural affairs, development of a tripartite free trade agreement and a united front in negotiating with Western nations in the World Trade Organization (WTO), calling for reform of the U.N. Security Council and supporting each other's bid for permanent membership with veto rights. The IBSA Dialogue Forum was created to promote cooperation and consensus on issues of trade, poverty alleviation, intellectual property rights, social development, agriculture, climate change, culture, defence, education, energy, health-care, information society, science and technology, peaceful nuclear energy, tourism and transport. The fourth summit was held in Brasília. The three nations pledged to boost trilateral trade to US$15 billion by 2010. The three nations have also expanded military cooperation and conducted joint naval exercises in 2008. South Africa and India Conclude Historic Cheetah Reintroduction Agreement: Over 100 Cheetahs to be Transferred in Decades to Come.

== See also ==
- Foreign relations of India
- Foreign relations of South Africa
- Indian South Africans
