= India–Kazakhstan relations =

- India: Kazakhstan

Diplomatic mission
- Embassy of India, Astana: Embassy of Kazakhstan, New Delhi

Envoy
- Indian Ambassador to Kazakhstan Dr. T.V. Nagendra Prasad: Kazakhstani Ambassador to India Azamat Yeskarayev

India–Kazakhstan relations were officially established between the Republic of India and the Republic of Kazakhstan in 1992, after the latter declared its independence from the Soviet Union. Since the 21st century, diplomatic relations have increased significantly; both nations seek to develop an extensive commercial and strategic partnership in the Central Asia region.

== History ==
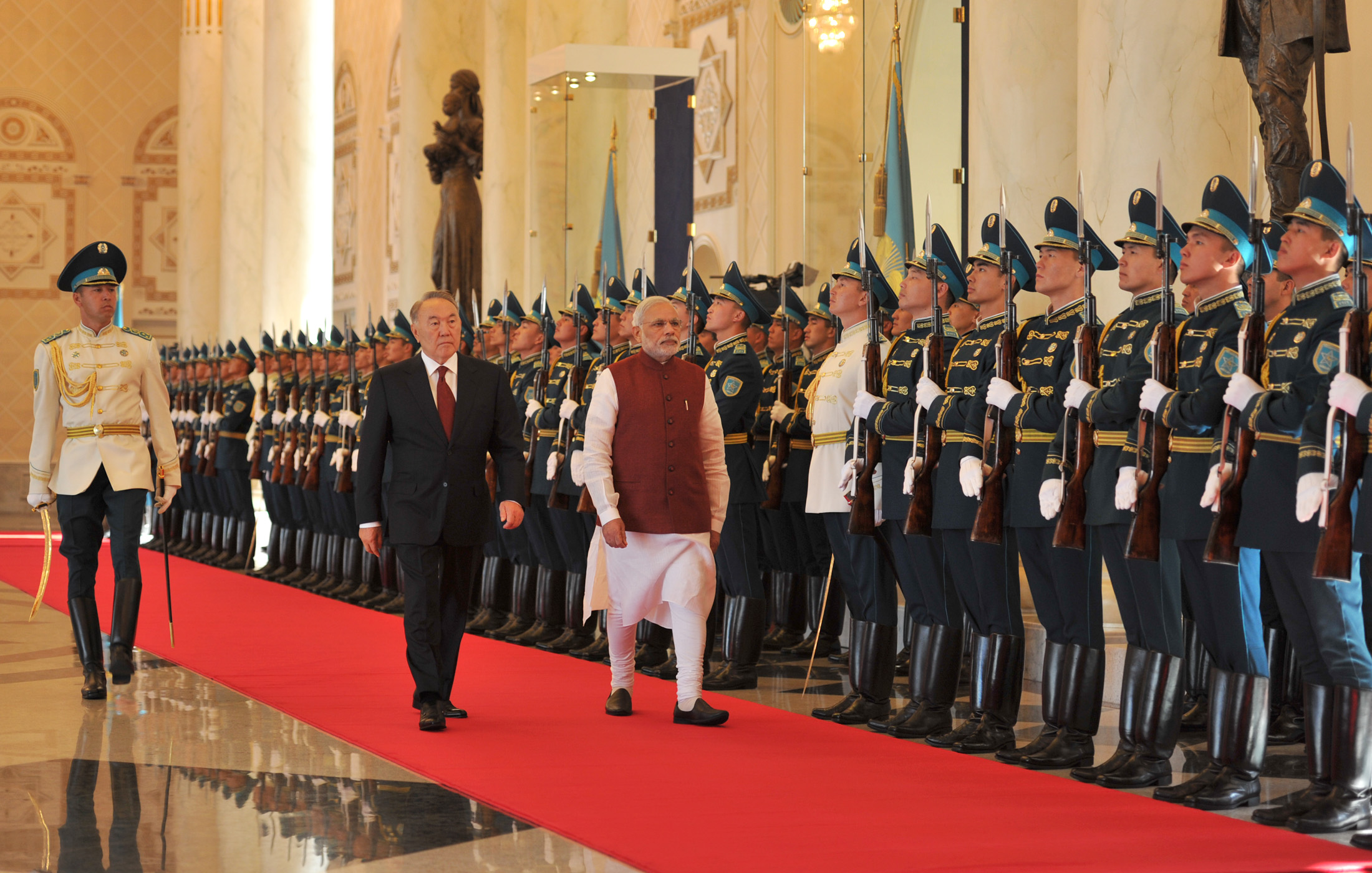
Indian Prime Minister Narendra Modi receives a guard of honour during his visit to Kazakhstan in July 2015.

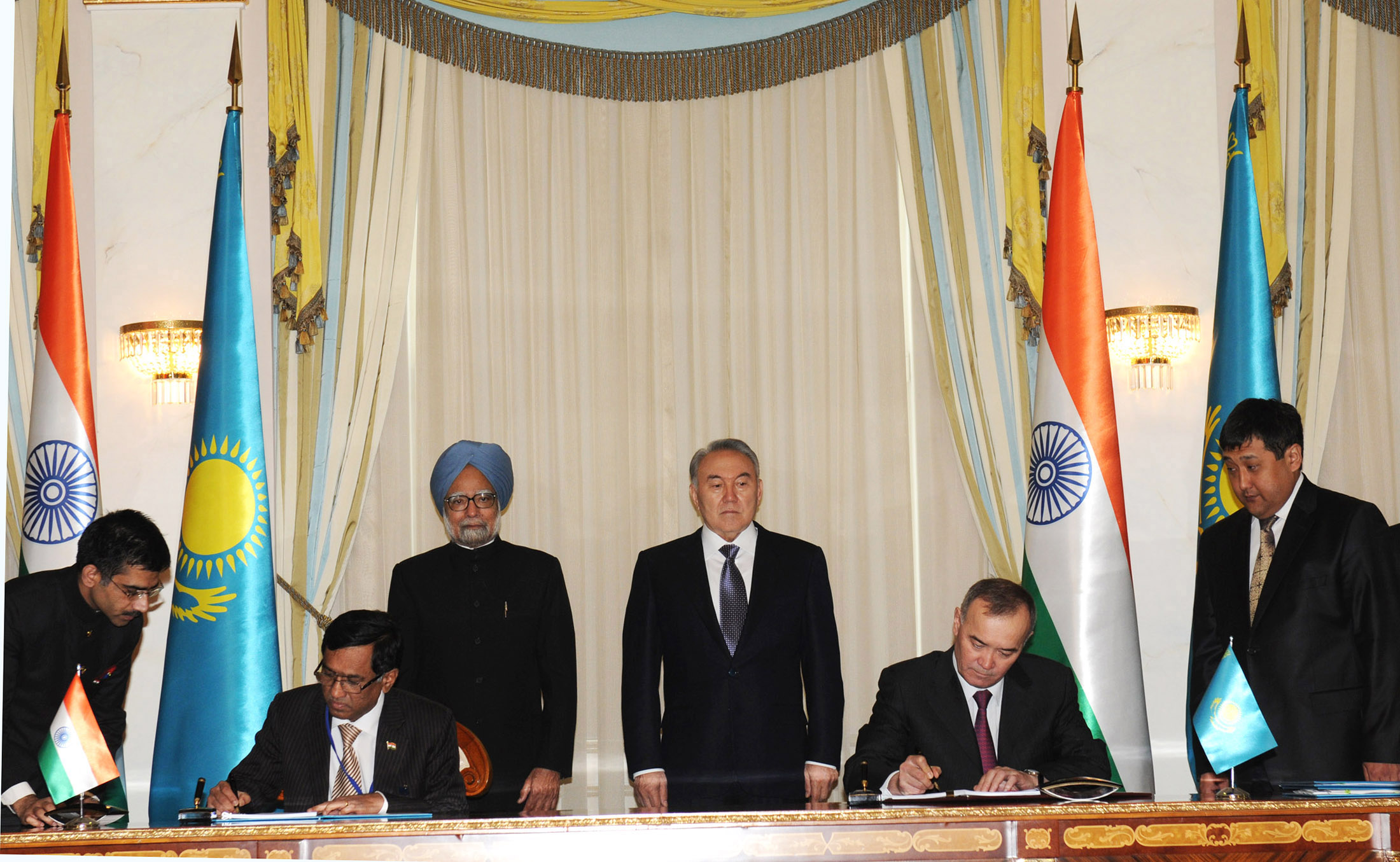
Indian Prime Minister Manmohan Singh and Kazakhstan President Nursultan Nazarbayev at Astana; 2011.

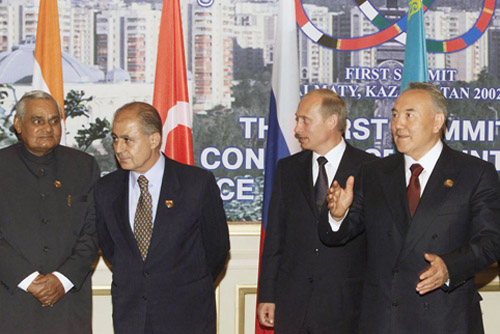
Indian Prime Minister Atal Bihari Vajpayee, Turkish President Ahmet Necdet Sezer, Russian President Vladimir Putin, and Kazakh President Nursultan Nazarbayev (left to right) meeting in Almaty; 2002.

India recognised the independence of Kazakhstan from the Soviet Union after the latter's dissolution in 1992, continuing the good relations it had with the Soviet Union. In recent years, India has sought to increase its commerce and strategic ties with Kazakhstan, which is the second largest nation of the former Soviet republics and occupies a major expanse of territory in Central Asia with extensive oil, natural gas and mineral reserves. India holds a keen interest in the natural resources of Kazakhstan as it aims to industrialize its domestic economy. India has sought to expand ties after mounting concern over the growth of the economic and strategic influence of the People's Republic of China.

The President of Kazakhstan, Nursultan Nazarbayev, paid several official visits to India: official visits in 1992, 1996, and 2002, as well as a state visit in 2009. Senior Indian leaders also paid visits to Kazakhstan during Nazarbayev’s presidency. In 1993, the Prime Minister of India, P. V. Narasimha Rao, made an official visit. This was followed by an official visit by the Vice President of India, K. R. Narayanan, in 1996. In 2002, Prime Minister Atal Bihari Vajpayee paid an official visit to Kazakhstan and participated in the summit of the Conference on Interaction and Confidence-Building Measures in Asia (CICA). Further high-level visits included an official visit by Vice President Mohammad Hamid Ansari in 2008, an official visit by Prime Minister Manmohan Singh in 2011, and an official visit by Prime Minister Narendra Modi in 2015.

In 2002, Nursultan Nazarbayev made an official visit to India and in the same year, the Indian Prime Minister Atal Bihari Vajpayee attended the summit of the Conference on Interaction and Confidence-Building Measures in Asia in Kazakhstan's former capital city, Almaty. Kazakhstan and India have been building cooperation in various key sectors such as tourism, energy, business, education, IT and security.

In April 2011, Indian Prime Minister Manmohan Singh visited Kazakhstan, where he and President Nursultan Nazarbayev adopted a "Road Map" in order to strengthen their strategic partnership. During the visit, the two countries signed seven agreements covering energy, cyber security, space exploration, education, and high-tech development.

A key energy deal involved India's ONGC Videsh Limited acquiring a 25% stake in the Satpayev oil field on the Caspian shore for $400 million, with estimated reserves of 1.85 billion barrels. Kazakhstan also agreed to supply India with over 2,000 tons of uranium by 2014 to support India's growing nuclear energy needs, projected to reach 8,000 tons annually by 2020, and discussions were held on joint nuclear reactor construction. By 2009, Kazakhstan was India’s largest trading partner in Central Asia, accounting for over 70% of India’s trade with the region, with bilateral trade at $300 million and Indian investments in Kazakhstan at $38 million. To enhance trade and energy cooperation, both nations emphasized the development of North-South transportation, pipeline, and trade corridors.

In technology, India and Kazakhstan signed a memorandum to enhance cyber security through collaboration between their computer emergency response teams, prompted by reported cyber attacks on Kazakhstan’s energy sector. India also proposed establishing an IT center in Kazakhstan to leverage its software expertise. In space cooperation, India’s advanced space program was positioned to support Kazakhstan's efforts to develop its own space industry, which is limited by its reliance on leasing the Baikonur Cosmodrome to Russia until 2050. These agreements reflect India's aim to expand its strategic presence in Central Asia, countering China's influence, while Kazakhstan's multi-vector foreign policy positions India as a key partner alongside Russia, the United States, the European Union, and China.

== Development of bilateral relations ==
As of 2003, Indian–Kazakhstani trade stands at $78,910,000. To bolster commerce, both nations have established the Indo-Kazakh Joint Business Council. Although India failed to acquire equity in the Kurmangazy oil field, the Oil and Natural Gas Corporation of India is set to acquire a stake in the Satpayev field. The Kazakh national firm KazmunayGaz had offered the ONGC a choice between Satpayev and Makhambet fields and has asked for Indian participation in petrochemical industrial projects in the Atirau and Akhtau regions. Both nations have also sought to establish extensive collaboration and commerce in information technology, space research, banking and increasing volume of bilateral trade. India has offered Kazakhstan $1,000,000,000 in loans while the latter has granted major tax concessions to Indian companies. Kazakhstan has also sought to negotiate a multilateral agreement with Iran and Turkmenistan to create a transport corridor to India to ensure a reliable trade route and provide Kazakhstan commercial and shipping access to the warm water ports of India.

India is working towards the development of its civilian nuclear energy industry as a clean alternative to satisfy its huge energy needs. Since Kazakhstan has plenty of the uranium required for nuclear energy, India is developing a strong relationship with Kazakhstan. India invited the Kazakh President for the Republic Day celebrations in New Delhi, in January 2009.

=== Trade balance ===
Trade value
	2010–11	2011–12	2012–13	2013-14	2014–15
Total trade	$130,590,000	$436,250,000	$426,220,000	$917,840,000	$952,260,000
Exports from India to Kazakhstan	$172,160,000	$244,390,000	$286,230,000	$261,510,000	$250,590,000
Imports to India from Kazakhstan	$138,420,000	$191,860,000	$139,990,000	$656,330,000	$701,570,000
Ministry of Commerce & Industry, India as on 08.07.2015

Major products exported to Kazakhstan by India include pharmaceuticals, medical products, tea, telephone apparatus, raw tobacco, and construction machinery. Major exports from Kazakhstan and imported by India include: petroleum oils, oils from bituminous minerals, radioactive chemical elements, asbestos, and titanium.

Kazakhstan is the largest supplier of uranium to India providing 5,000 tonnes between 2015–l and 2019.

=== Humanitarian Assistance ===
==== COVID-19 ====
Kazakhstan sent medical equipment and protective gear to India in response to the surging new COVID-19 cases experienced in May 2021.

== Strategic co-operation ==
India and Kazakhstan have developed close collaboration in fighting religious terrorism an extremism, as well as in promoting regional security. A joint memorandum signed in December 2002 enabled joint projects such as training military officers, developing joint military-industrial projects and establishing a partnership between the defence industries of India and Kazakhstan. India has also provided support and emerged as a partner in Kazakhstan's bid to develop a naval fleet in the Caspian Sea, despite opposition from Kazakhstan's northern neighbour, Russia. The Kazakhstan President Nursultan Nazarbayev visited India in January 2009 and a civil nuclear pact were made with India under which the uranium-rich Central Asian country will supply fuel to atomic plants in India.

The two countries held the Prabal Dostyk joint military exercises in Kazakhstan in 2016 and the Himachal Pradesh region in 2017.

In August 2025, India and Kazakhstan held discussions in New Delhi to enhance their defence cooperation and military ties. Kazakhstan's First Deputy Minister of Defence and Chief of the General Staff of the Armed Forces, Lieutenant General Sultan Kamaletdinov, met with India's Chief of Defence Staff General Anil Chauhan and Army Chief General Upendra Dwivedi. Both nations recognized the robust and dynamic nature of their defence partnership, highlighting significant potential for further collaboration and innovation.

== Kazakhstan and TAPI ==
India has broached the idea of a hydrocarbon pipeline with Kazakhstan that would bring fuel through a five-nation route. India unveiled the concept of the pipeline, which in future could be extended to Russia, during a meeting between External Affairs Minister Salman Khurshid and his visiting Kazakh counterpart Erlan Idrissov. The two Ministers will revisit the idea when they will meet twice in the coming months – first on the sidelines of the Istanbul process meeting on Afghanistan in Almaty and later during a stand-alone visit by Mr. Khurshid to the Kazakh capital of Astana.

The proposed pipeline would cover about 1,500 km (930 mi), thus making it longer than the planned Turkmenistan-Afghanistan-Pakistan-India (TAPI) pipeline which will serve as the role model. It will head from the former Silk Road caravanserai city of Shymkent, known today for oil refining, and enter Uzbekistan. From there it will go to Afghanistan and then follow the route to be taken by the TAPI pipeline into India via Pakistan. Officials said currently most hydrocarbon pipelines from Central Asia are on an east–west axis. This pipeline will, like TAPI, be on a north–south axis, providing a new route to South Asia for hydrocarbons extracted from Central Asia.

== Indian Ambassadors to Kazakhstan ==
1. Rajiv Sikri (1995–1999)
2. Syed Raza Hashim (1999–2002)
3. Vidya Sagar Verma (2002–2004)
4. Asoke Kumar Mukherjee (2004–2007)
5. Ashok Sajjanhar (2007–2010)
6. Ashok Kumar Sharma (2011–2014)
7. Harsh Kumar Jain (2014–2017)
8. Prabhat Kumar (2017–2021)
9. Shubdarshini Tripathi (2021–2023)
10. Dr. T.V. Nagendra Prasad (2023–present)

== Resident diplomatic missions ==
- India has an embassy in Astana.
- Kazakhstan has an embassy in New Delhi.

== See also ==
- India–Kyrgyzstan relations
- India–Tajikistan relations
- India–Turkmenistan relations
- India–Uzbekistan relations
