= India–Uzbekistan relations =

- India: Uzbekistan

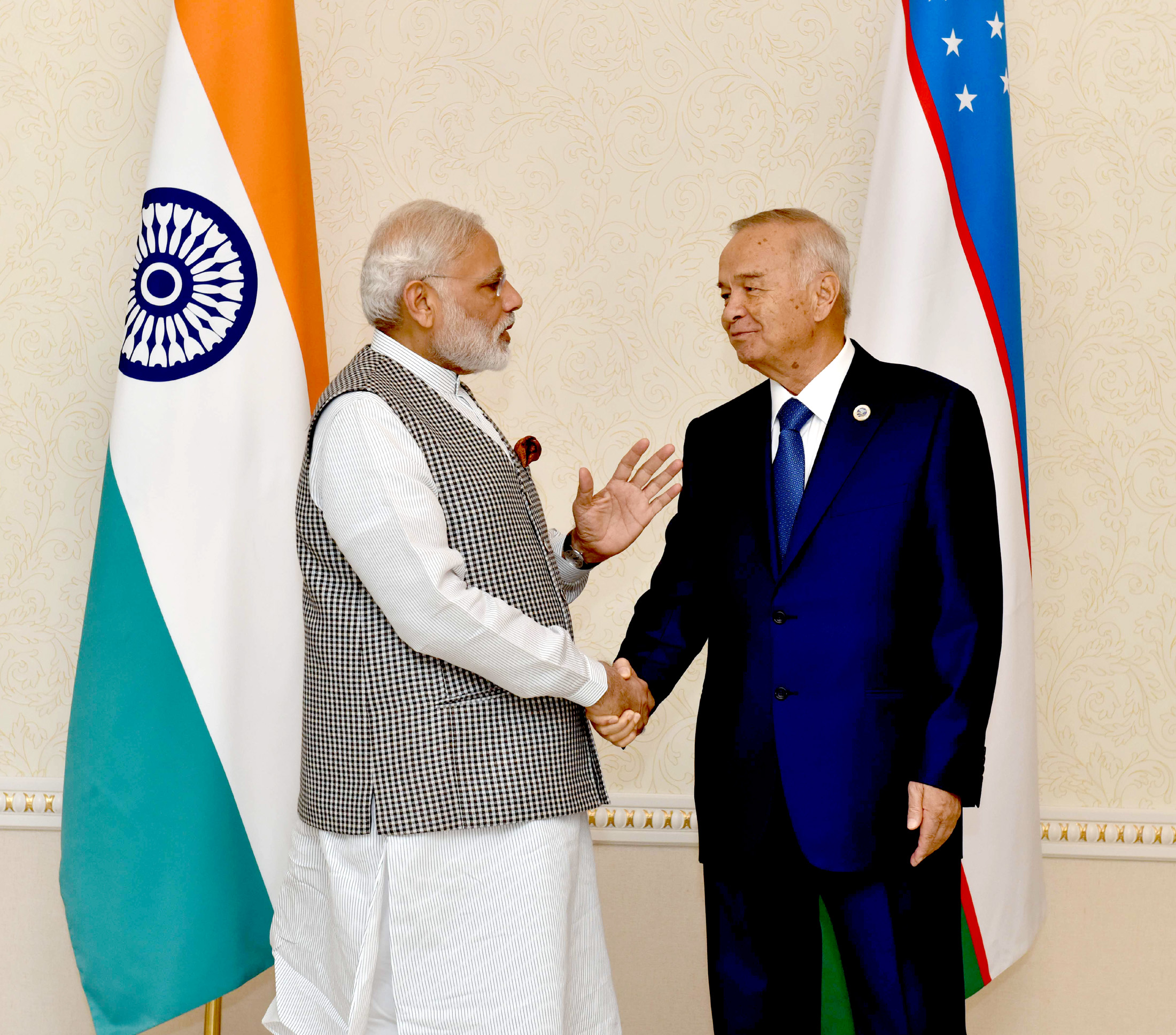
Indian Prime Minister Narendra Modi and the Uzbek President Islam Karimov.

India–Uzbekistan relations were officially established between the Republic of India and the Republic of Uzbekistan in 1992. India has an embassy in Tashkent; whilst Uzbekistan has an embassy in New Delhi.

== History ==
=== Early history ===
The two nations share many historical ties, both of them being on the Silk Road, and various Turkic dynasties had been established in India, in which they were all Indianised and began to refer to themselves Indians only.

Babur, the founder of the Mughal Empire which ruled India from 1526 to 1857, was born in Andijan in present-day Uzbekistan. Babur, although divisive in India, was part of the Timurid lineage that started under Timur (founder of original Gurkani realm), and today is considered a national hero in his native Uzbekistan. According to historian Scott C. Levi, periods of famine and instability in early eighteenth-century Central Asia prompted migration into the Mughal Empire. In 1717, an estimated 12,000 residents of Samarkand fled their famine-stricken homeland for India, seeking subsistence and employment under Mughal authority.

=== Modern history ===
India's first Prime Minister Jawaharlal Nehru visited Tashkent and Samarkand during his state visit to the Soviet Union from 7 to 23 June 1955. He visited Tashkent again during his state visit from 6 to 12 September 1961. Tashkent was the location of a historic meeting in January 1966 between Indian Prime Minister Lal Bahadur Shastri and Pakistani President Muhammad Ayub Khan. The Soviet Union, represented by Premier Alexei Kosygin served as moderators. The Tashkent conference, under United Nations, American and Soviet pressure, compelled India to give away the conquered region in Pakistan and the 1949 ceasefire line in Kashmir bringing an end to the Indo-Pakistani War of 1965. Prime Minister Shastri died in Tashkent, at 2 AM on the day after signing the Tashkent Declaration, reportedly due to a heart attack, but people allege a conspiracy behind the death. He was the first Prime Minister of India to die overseas.

Uzbekistan declared its independence on 1 September 1991. The Consulate General of India in Tashkent was opened on 7 April 1987. It was upgraded to an embassy on 18 March 1992. Since then the countries have developed strong ties in the domains of economics, culture, tourism, technology and education.

==== Timeline of state visits ====
- P. V. Narasimha Rao became the first Indian Prime Minister to visit Uzbekistan from 23 to 25 May 1993.
- Prime Minister Manmohan Singh visited the country from 25 to 26 April 2006
- Uzbek President Islam Karimov has visited India several times; in 1991, 1994, 2000, 2005 and in May 2011.
- Prime Minister Narendra Modi visited Uzbekistan in July 2015 and August 2026.
- Karimov's successor, Shavkat Mirziyoyev visited New Delhi in Autumn 2018 and January 2019.

== Trade ==
Bilateral trade between India and Uzbekistan stood at US$235 million between 2017 and 2018. Indian pharmaceutical companies are active in many central Asian countries, including Uzbekistan. The government of Uzbekistan has been courting Indian investors in the fields of IT, pharmaceutical technology, agriculture and electronics.

== Cuisine ==
Pilaf, samosa and naan are popular foods in both Indian (particularly North Indian) and Uzbek cuisines. In recent years a few Indian restaurants have opened up in Tashkent.

== Education ==
Sharda University, a private university based in north India, opened an international campus in Andijan in 2019. Sharda University Uzbekistan currently offers courses in humanities, management and computer engineering. More than 12000 Indian students are studying at medical colleges in Samarkand, Bukhara, Andijan and Tashkent. Due to tensions in Ukraine, Russia and Kyrgyzstan, many Indian students from those countries have shifted to Uzbekistan.

== See also ==
- Foreign relations of India
- India–Afghanistan relations
- India–Kazakhstan relations
- India–Kyrgyzstan relations
- India–Tajikistan relations
- India–Turkmenistan relations
