= India–Switzerland relations =

- India: Switzerland

Diplomatic mission
- Embassy of India, Bern: Embassy of Switzerland, New Delhi

Envoy
- Indian Ambassador to Switzerland Monika Kapil Mohta: Swiss Ambassador to India Ralf Heckner

India–Switzerland relations refers to the bilateral ties between the Republic of India and the Swiss Confederation, which include cooperation in trade, science, education, and culture. Switzerland maintains diplomatic representations in multiple Indian cities. India has an embassy in Bern and consulates general in Geneva and Zurich. In 2023, the two countries marked the 75th anniversary of the Treaty of Friendship signed in 1948.

India is one of Switzerland’s principal economic partners in Asia. Bilateral trade includes Swiss exports such as pharmaceuticals, machinery, and chemicals, and Indian exports of chemicals, textiles, agricultural products, and precious metals. Swiss companies operate in India through subsidiaries, joint ventures, or branches.

Switzerland and India signed a science and technology agreement in 2003, followed by a memorandum of understanding on cooperation in the social sciences in 2012. Activities under these agreements are carried out through the Indo-Swiss Joint Research Programme. Swissnex India, based in Bangalore, facilitates exchanges between the two countries in science, education, the arts, and innovation.

== History ==
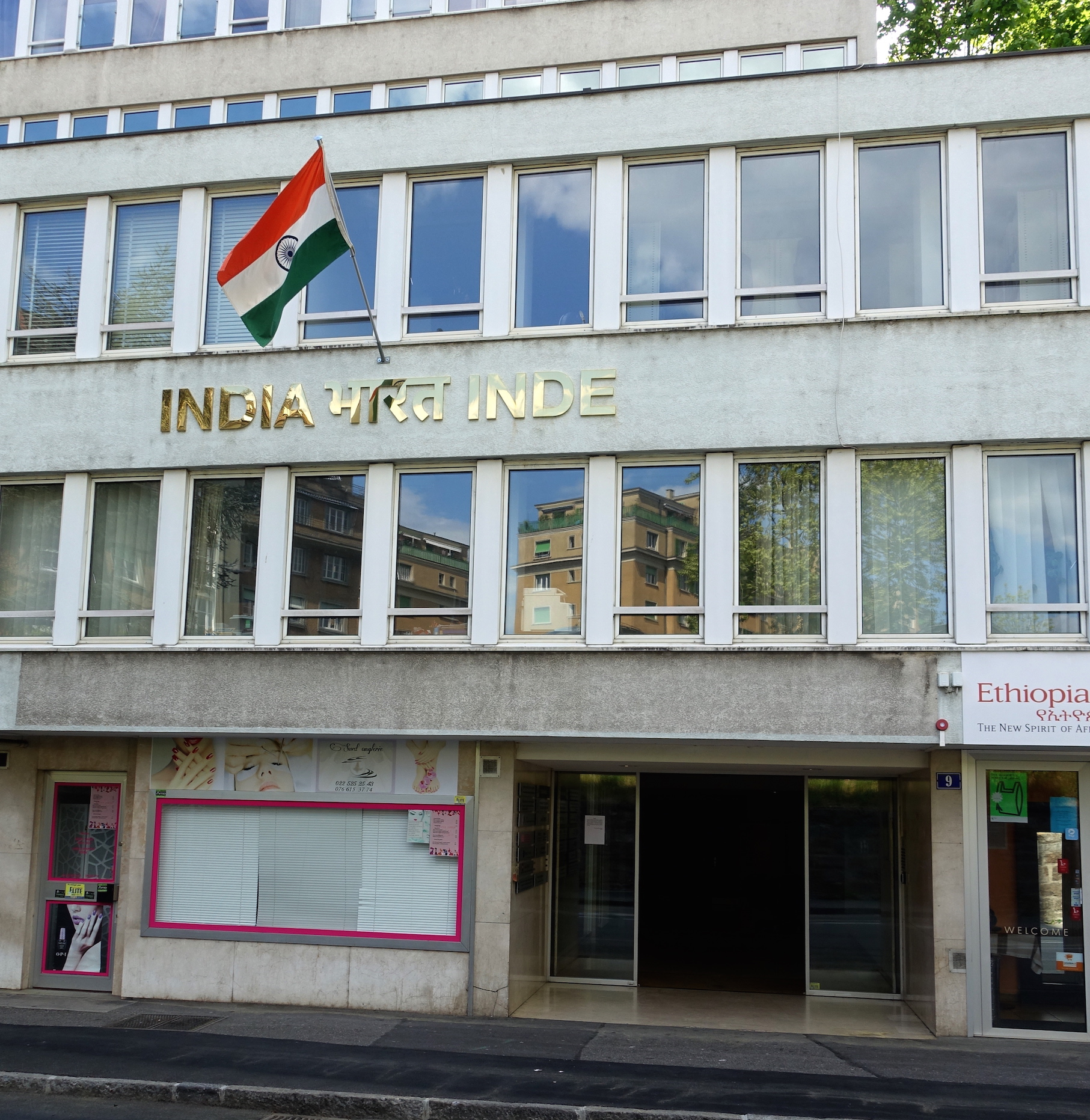
Consulate-General of India in Geneva

Early technical cooperation between the two countries included the Indo-Swiss Training Centre in Chandigarh, set up under a 1961 agreement between India's Council of Scientific and Industrial Research and the Swiss Foundation for Technical Cooperation (later Swisscontact) to train technicians in precision engineering. Prime Minister Jawaharlal Nehru inaugurated it on 18 December 1963, describing it as an example of cooperation between the two countries.

In June 2016, Indian Prime Minister Narendra Modi met with Swiss President Johann Schneider-Ammann in Geneva to discuss bilateral cooperation. Reuters reported that Modi said Switzerland had agreed to make combating tax evasion and “black money” a shared priority, and had expressed support for India's bid to join the Nuclear Suppliers Group (NSG). In the same month, the BBC reported that China opposed India’s bid to join the NSG, stating that non-signatories of the Nuclear Non-Proliferation Treaty should not be granted membership.

In 2021, during the COP26 summit in Glasgow, the Glasgow Climate Pact was adopted despite a last-minute intervention by India to change the language on coal from “phase out” to “phase down”. Swiss Environment Minister Simonetta Sommaruga expressed disappointment at India’s proposal to weaken the final wording on coal.

== See also ==
- Foreign relations of India
- Foreign relations of Switzerland
