= India–Laos relations =

- India: Laos

Diplomatic mission
- Embassy of India, Vientiane: Embassy of Laos, New Delhi

Envoy
- Indian Ambassador to Laos Yogeshwar Sangwan: Lao Ambassador to India Bounneme Chouanghom

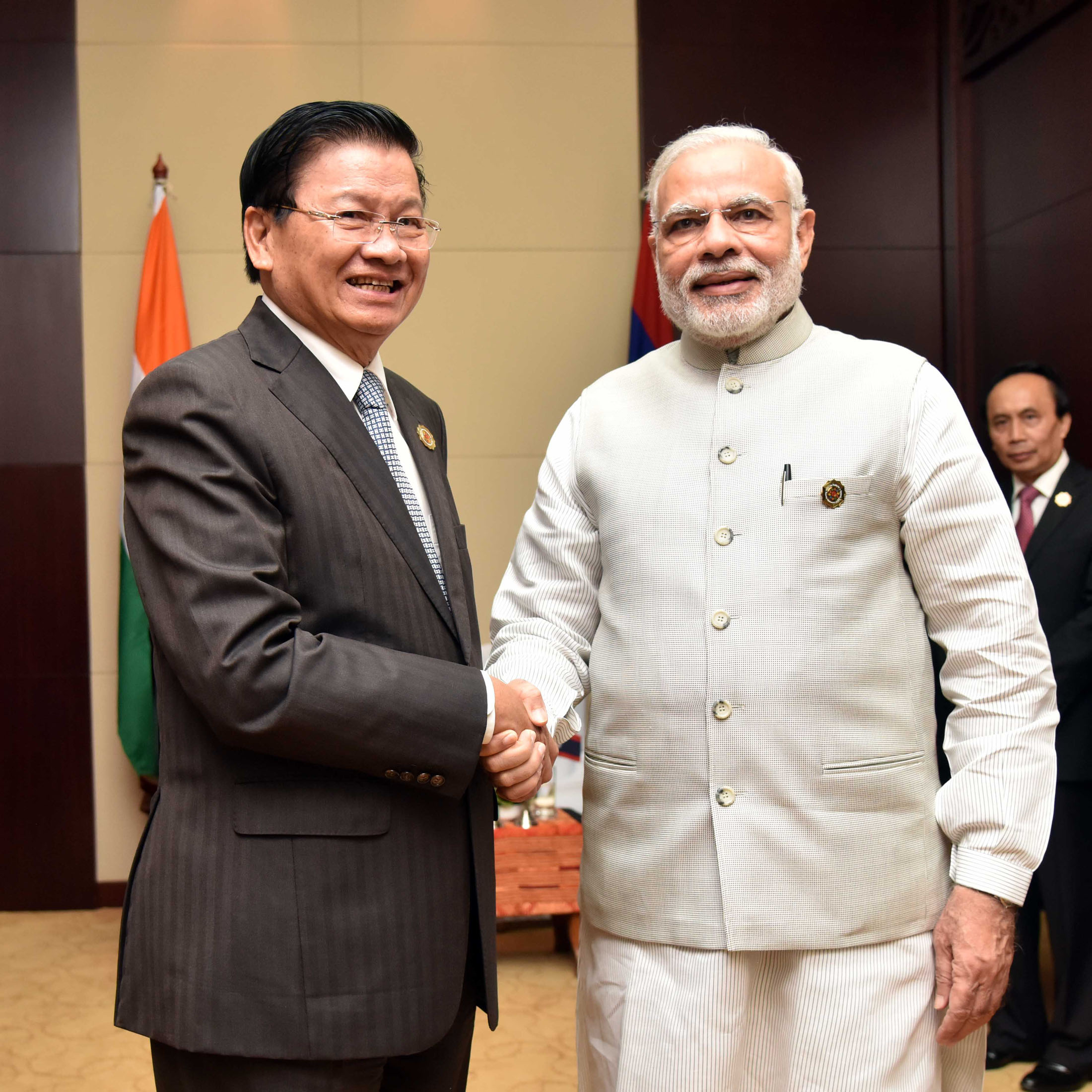
Prime Ministers Narendra Modi and Thongloun Sisoulith meeting in September 2016.

India–Laos relations (Lao: ການພົວພັນອິນເດຍ-ລາວ), also referred to as Indian-Lao relations or Indo-Lao relations, are bilateral relations between India and Laos. Relations between two nations were established in February 1956. First Prime Minister of India Jawaharlal Nehru visited Laos in 1954 while first President of India Rajendra Prasad visited Laos in 1956. India considers Laos as strategically important in accordance with China's growing land-reclamation activities in the South China Sea. Laos has been supportive to India's efforts to become a permanent member of the UN Security Council.

== Bilateral visits ==
Since establishment of bilateral ties there has been numerous high level bilateral visits between India and Laos. Recent visit was by Vice-President of India Hamid Ansari in September 2015 where he signed 5 "quick impact projects". Then Indian Prime Minister Manmohan Singh visited Laos in 2004 for 10th ASEAN Summit where he met Laos PM Bounhang Vorachit, agreements regarding 3rd India-ASEAN summit were signed between them. Indian PM Atal Bihari Vajpeyee visited Laos in 2002. Indian President Pratibha Patil visited Laos in 2010. High level visits from Laos to India were, Prince Souphanouvong, who was the first President of Laos, visited India in 1975. In recent times Laos PM Choummaly Sayasone visited India in 2008. There are several other foreign minister and secretary level visits from each country to other.

== Strategic ties ==
On 3 day India visit of Laos President Choummaly Sayasone in 2008, India decided to establish an "Air Force Academy" in Laos. India also gifted 50 parachutes to "Lao Defence Forces" on its 60th anniversary in 2009. India held its Surya Kiran air show at Laos.

== Economic ties ==
In 2013 at 7th "India-Lao Joint Commission Meeting" (JMC) India agrees to provide $66.15 million to Laos for irrigation and hydro power projects. This includes 4 irrigation projects in 3 provinces of Laos in addition to extension of Nam Boun-2 hydro power plant.

=== Agreements ===
There have been several agreements signed between India and Laos in last decade regarding issues related to science & technology, trade and culture.

- India will spend $4.11 million over 8 years for restoration of world heritage site of Laos at Vat Phou as per MoU signed on 2007. Project has been started on 2009.
- In 2010 visit of Indian President Pratibha Patil, a "Cultural Exchange Programme" for the year 2011–13 was signed between 2 nations.
- As per Indian Technical and Economic Cooperation (ITEC) Agreement, since 1994, "Indian Army Training Team" conducts training sessions for Lao defence forces in some basic tactics along with English language and computers.

=== Bilateral trade ===
Metals, ores, machinery, electronic equipment, pharmaceuticals and timber are the main products traded between two nations. In 2008–09 bilateral trade between two nations was just $9.52 million which saw rapid growth in 2009–10 with trade of $37 million. However trade was again decreased in 2010–11 with $13.33 million. Since then trade was rapidly increased again to $167.49 million in 2012–13.
