= India–Tanzania relations =

- India: Tanzania

Diplomatic mission
- High Commission of India, Dar es Salaam: High Commission, New Delhi

India–Tanzania relations refers to the bilateral relations between India and Tanzania. India has a High Commission in Dar es Salaam, Tanzania has a High Commission in New Delhi, which is also accredited to Sri Lanka, Nepal, Bangladesh and Myanmar. Diplomatic relations are described as close, friendly and cooperative. 15,000 Indians visited Tanzania in 2007. In May 2011, then Prime Minister of India Manmohan Singh called for strengthening cooperation with Tanzania. Trade between India and Tanzania amounted to 31 billion dollars in 2009–10 and India is Tanzania's second-largest investor. Both countries are members of the Commonwealth of Nations and Non-Aligned Movement.

From the 1960s to the 1980s, both countries had the same view on anti-racism and anti-colonialism. In November 1962, India opened a High Commission in Dar es Salaam and a consulate general in Zanzibar in October 1974.

On 24 February 2026, a meeting between Tanzania's vice president Emmanuel Nchimbi and India's High Commissioner to Tanzania Bashwadip Dey was held in Dar es Salaam to discuss defence and security as well as enhance cooperation from health to trade and investment.

== Exchange of visits ==
Besides the exchanging visits of Foreign Ministers and other high level Government Dignitaries, the two countries have also witnessed the exchange of visits of their high level Government and Political Leaders as shown below:

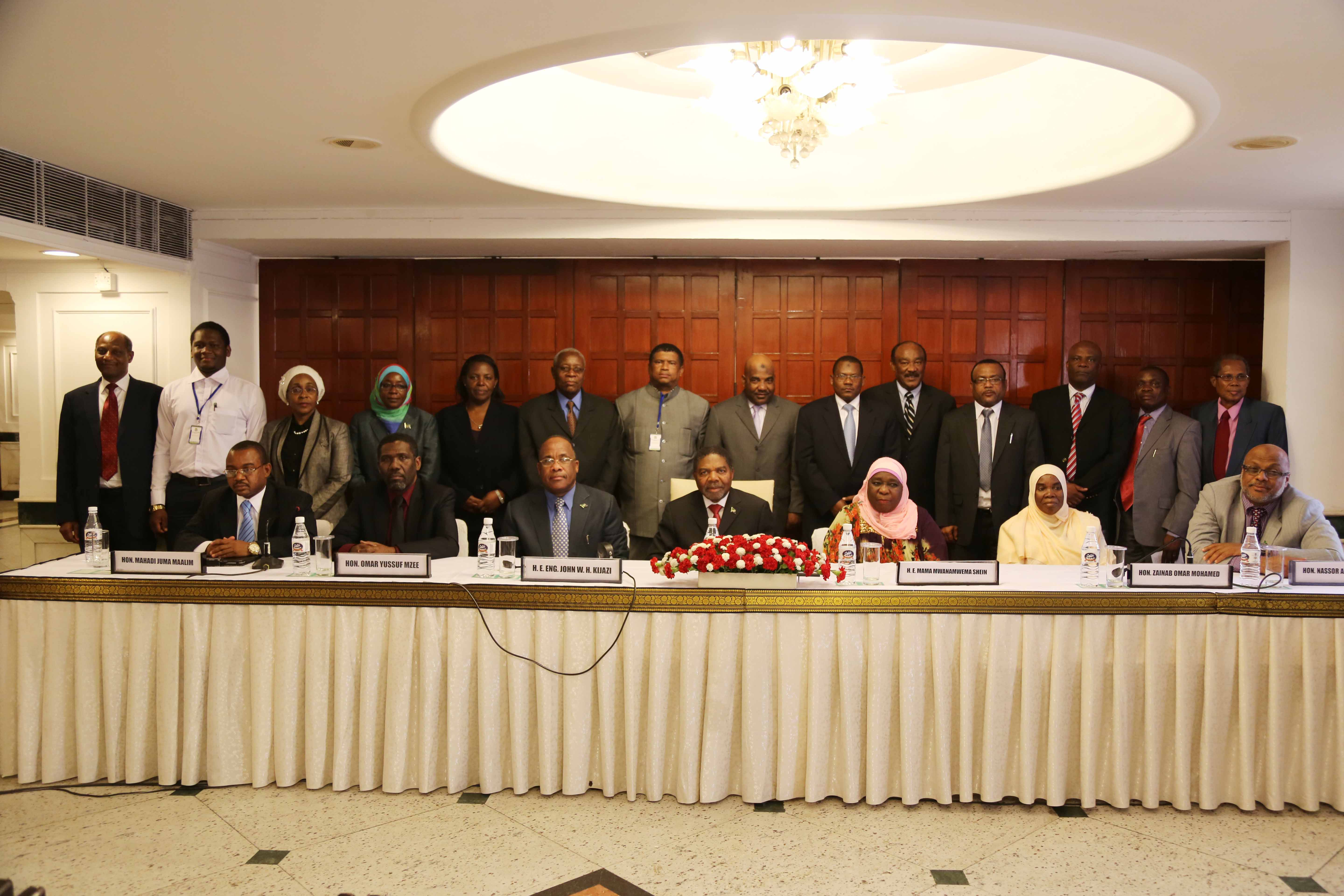
Zanzibar President Dr. Ali Mohammed Shein during a state visit to New Delhi.

=== Tanzania High Level Visits to India ===
S/No.	Name	Year
1	President Mwalimu J.K. Nyerere	1971, 1976, 1981, 1982, 1983, 1984, 1985, 1988, 1991, 1996
2	First Vice President and President of Zanzibar, Aboud Jumbe Mwinyi	1973,1977,1978
3	Prime Minister Rashidi Mfaume Kawawa	1975
4	President Ali Hassan Mwinyi	1989,1993
5	Prime Minister Edward M. Sokoine	1980
6	President William Benjamin Mkapa	2002
7	President of Zanzibar Amani A. Karume	2004
8	Vice President Dr. Ali Mohamed Shein	March, 2008
9	President Jakaya Mrisho Kikwete	April, 2008, June 17–21, 2015
10	Prime Minister Mizengo Peter Pinda	September, 2009
11	1st Vice President of Zanzibar Seif Sharif Hamad	September 2011
12	President of Zanzibar Dr. Ali Mohamed Shein	February 2014
13	President Jakaya Kikwete	2014
14	President Samia Suluhu Hasan	October 2023

=== India High Level Visits to Tanzania ===
S/No.	Name	Year
1	President V.V. Giri	1972
2	Vice President Dr. G.S. Pathak	1974
3	Vice President B.D. Jatti	1975
4	Prime Minister Indira Gandhi	1976, 1980
5	Prime Minister Rajiv Gandhi	1986
6	President R. Venkataraman	1989
7	Prime Minister I.K. Gujral	1997
8	President Abdul Kalam	2004
9	Prime Minister Dr. Manmohan Singh	2011
10	Prime Minister Narendra Modi	2016

== Bilateral agreements ==
- Joint Permanent Commission signed on 17 January 1975. The Seventh JPC met in New Delhi from 13 to 14 January 2009.
- Agreement on Avoidance of Double Taxation and Prevention of Fiscal Evasion (1979). The 3rd round of talks for review of the same was held in New Delhi from 28 to 30 April 2009 and a new one was signed in Dar es Salaam on 27 May 2011.
- Agreement on Friendship and Technical, Economic and Scientific Cooperation (28 January 1966).
- Air Services Agreement (1995) Talks were held in Dar es Salaam in April 2006 to update the Agreement.
- MOU for Cooperation in the field of Agriculture was signed on 16 December 2002 during the visit of President Benjamin William Mkapa to India.
- Loan agreement between Exim Bank and Tanzanian government on a line of credit for $268.35 million for extension of pipeline project was signed during Tanzania President Kikwete visit to India.
- Cooperation in the field of hydrology, tourism and agriculture.

== Non-governmental agreements ==
- Agreement in the field of Health & Medicine signed on 16 December 2002 during the visit of President Benjamin William Mkapa to India.
- Exchange Program on Cooperation in the field of Higher Education signed on 27 April 2003.
- Trade Agreement was signed on 14 January 2000. Pursuant to the Agreement a Joint Trade Committee was established. The second meeting of the JTC was held in New Delhi from 16 – 18 May 2007.
- MOU on Defense Cooperation signed on 1 October 2003 in New Delhi.
- Duty Free Tariff Preference Scheme offered by India (Tanzania Accessed the scheme from 22 May 2009).
- Bilateral Investment Promotion Protection Agreement (BIPPA) The first negotiating meeting was held in New Delhi in January, 2010. Final fine tuning of the Agreement still outstanding.
- Recent announcements and signed agreements (During Hon. Manmohan Singh Visit to Tanzania in May 2011)
- India will avail US$100,000 Grant Money for school laboratory Equipments
- India will avail US$10,000,000 Grant Money for Capacity building on Social and Education Sectors.
- India promised to help establishing a Vocational training centre in Zanzibar
- A line of Credit facility amounting to US$180 Million for water projects (Dar es Salaam and Coast) is available to Tanzania.
- India and Tanzania signed an agreement on Avoidance of double taxation and Prevention of Fiscal Evasion with respect to taxes on Income.
- India and Tanzania signed a Joint Action Plan between Small Scale Development Organization (SIDO – Tanzania) and National Small Industries Corporation Ltd of (NSIC – India).
- Preliminary joint venture agreement between Apollo Hospitals and NSSF Tanzania for building Apollo Hospital in Dare s salaam Tanzania was signed.
- Also during the India's Prime Minister Visit to Tanzania, the India-Tanzania Centre of Excellence in “Information and Communication Technology” was inaugurated in Dar es Salaam at the Dar es Salaam Institute of Technology.
- MoU on cooperation between the Zanzibar Institute if Financial Administration (ZIFA) and the Indian Institute of Applied Manpower Resources (IAMR).
- Agreement on the Establishment of Joint Business Council between FICCI &ASSOCHAM, and the Tanzania Chamber of Commerce, Industry & Agriculture –TCCIA signed on 25 June 1997.
- MOU between CII and the Confederation of Tanzanian Industries - CTI signed on 4 October 1996.
- Cooperation Agreement between Indian Merchants’ Chamber (IMC) and TCCIA – signed on 11 July 1995.
- MoU for establishing India-Tanzania Centre of Excellence in ICT at the Dar es Salaam Institute of Technology – signed in March 2008.
- MOU between the Indo-Africa Chambers of Commerce and Industry – IACCI and the Zanzibar National Chamber of Commerce Industry and Agriculture – ZNCCIA signed on 28 April 2011
- India's government has offered $100 million to improve water supply in the commercial capital Dar es Salaam and $280 million to help supply water from Lake Victoria to Tabora, Nzega and Igunga town.
- Both countries have agreed to establish a Joint Working Group to strengthen cooperation in counter terrorism.
- Calling India a deserving nation for permanent membership of the U.N. Security Council, Tanzanian President Kikwete said, his country will continue to work with other African countries to back New Delhi's candidature.

== Bilateral relations ==
From the 1960s to the 1980s, the political relationship was driven largely by shared ideological commitments to anti-colonialism, socialism in various forms as well as genuine desire for South-South Cooperation. In recent years Indo-Tanzanian ties have evolved into a modern and pragmatic relationship with greater and diversified economic engagement. India is the leading trading partner of Tanzania's as well as an important source of essential machinery and pharmaceutical products. Many of the top business establishments of Tanzania are owned by members of the Indian origin. Indians form the largest expatriate community in Tanzania and their positive contribution in the progress and development of their host country is well recognised and appreciated. A friendship, technical, economic and scientific cooperation was signed in 1966. In 1975, a cultural agreement was signed. In 2008, a memorandum of understanding on tourism was signed between India and Tanzania. There are approximately 50,000 to 60,000 PIOs living and working in Tanzania. In addition there are approximately 10000 Indian expatriates.

== Indian community in Tanzania ==
The first Indian diaspora came to Tanzania shortly after World War I, when the League of Nations designed Tanzania as a British protectorate. 40.000 Indians live in Tanzania, predominantly in Dar es Salaam, Arusha, Dodoma, Morogoro, Mwanza, Mbeya and Zanzibar.

== See also ==
- Foreign relations of India
- Foreign relations of Tanzania
