= List of international trips made by S. Jaishankar as Minister of External Affairs of India =

This is a list of international trips undertaken by S. Jaishankar (in office since 2019) while serving as the Minister of External Affairs of India. The list includes both individual visits undertaken by him and visits in which he accompanied the Prime Minister or some other dignitary on their overseas visits. The list includes only foreign travel which he made during his tenure in the position.

== Summary of international trips ==
As of November 2026, S. Jaishankar has made 162 international trips, visiting 95 countries.

Map of international trips made by Subrahmanyam Jaishankar as Minister of External Affairs (as of June 2026).

As of November 2026:

One visit
Two visits
Three visits
Four visits
Five visits
Six or more visits
India

Minister of External Affairs S. Jaishankar's visits by country
Number of visits	Country
1 visit (35)	Antigua and Barbuda, Armenia, Brunei, Bulgaria, Colombia, Czech Republic, Dominican Republic, Fiji, Georgia, Ghana, Ireland, Ivory Coast, Jamaica, Kenya, Luxembourg, Mexico, Mongolia, Mozambique, New Zealand, Niger, Norway, Pakistan, Panama, Papua New Guinea, Paraguay, Portugal, Rwanda, Serbia, Slovenia, Spain, Suriname, Switzerland, Tanzania, Tunisia, Vietnam
2 visits (24)	Argentina, Austria, Azerbaijan, Cambodia, China, Croatia, Egypt, Ethiopia, Finland, Greece, Guyana, Kazakhstan, Laos, Malaysia, Namibia, Nepal, Nigeria, Seychelles, Slovakia, South Korea, Sweden, Trinidad and Tobago, Uganda, Ukraine
3 visits (17)	Bahrain, Bhutan, Brazil, Canada, Cyprus, Denmark, Indonesia, Iran, Israel, Kyrgyzstan, Netherlands, Philippines, Poland, Saudi Arabia, South Africa, Tajikistan, Uzbekistan
4 visits (4)	Kuwait, Mauritius, Oman, Thailand
5 visits (4)	Bangladesh, Belgium, Qatar, United Kingdom
6 visits (3)	Australia, Italy, Maldives
7 visits (1)	Singapore
8 visits (2)	France, Sri Lanka
9 visits (3)	Germany, Japan, United Arab Emirates
10 visits (1)	Russia
19 visits (1)	United States

== 2019 ==
	Country	Date(s)	Details	Images
1	Bhutan	7–8 June	First overseas first since assuming office. Met with King Jigme Khesar Namgyel Wangchuck, Prime Minister Lotay Tshering, and Foreign Minister Tandi Dorji.	
2	Tajikistan	14–15 June	Attended the 5th CICA Summit. Met with President Emomali Rahmon and other participating delegates.	
3	Japan	28–29 June	Accompanied Prime Minister Modi to the 14th G20 Summit.	
4	United Kingdom	9–11 July	Attended Commonwealth Foreign Ministers' Meeting. Met with Australian Foreign Minister Marise Payne and Bangladeshi Foreign Minister of State Shahriar Alam.	
5	Thailand	1–2 August	Attended ASEAN-India Ministerial Meeting, 9th East Asia Summit Foreign Ministers' Meeting, 26th ASEAN Regional Forum and 10th Mekong Ganga Cooperation Ministerial Meeting. Met with Foreign Minister Don Pramudwinai, Vietnamese Deputy Prime Minister Phạm Bình Minh and other visiting foreign ministers.	
6	China	11–13 August	Met with Vice President Wang Qishan and State Councillor and Foreign Minister Wang Yi.	
7	Bangladesh	19–21 August	Met with Prime Minister Sheikh Hasina, and Foreign Minister AK Abdul Momen.	
7	Nepal	21–22 August	Attended the Nepal-India Joint Commission Meeting. Met with President Bidya Devi Bhandari, Prime Minister K. P. Sharma Oli, and Foreign Minister Pradeep Kumar Gyawali.	
8	Russia	27–28 August	Met with Foreign Minister Sergey Lavrov and interacted at Valdai Discussion Club.	
8	Poland	28–29 August	Met with Prime Minister Mateusz Morawiecki, Deputy Prime Minister Piotr Gliński and Foreign Minister Jacek Czaputowicz.	
9	Maldives	3–4 September	Attended Indian Ocean Conference. Met with President Ibrahim Mohamed Solih, Speaker of the Parliament Mohamed Nasheed, and Foreign Minister Abdulla Shahid.	
9	Indonesia	4–6 September	Met with Foreign Minister Retno Marsudi and other senior ministers.	
9	Singapore	6–10 September	Attended the 6th India-Singapore Joint Ministerial Committee meeting. Met with Prime Minister Lee Hsien Loong and Foreign Minister Vivian Balakrishnan.	
10	Finland	19–21 September	Met with President Sauli Niinistö, Prime Minister Antti Rinne, and Foreign Minister Pekka Haavisto.	
10	United Nations; United States	21–30 September	Accompanied Prime Minister Modi to the 74th United Nations General Assembly session. Met with United Secretary Secretary of State Mike Pompeo and other visiting foreign ministers.	
11	Azerbaijan	23–26 October	Accompanied Vice President Venkaiah Naidu to the 18th Non-Aligned Movement Summit. Attended the NAM Ministerial Conference and met with other participating delegates.	
12	Thailand	2–4 November	Accompanied Prime Minister Modi to the ASEAN Summit.	
13	Serbia	7–9 November	Met with President Aleksandar Vučić, National Assembly Speaker Maja Gojković, and Deputy Prime Minister and Foreign Minister Ivica Dačić.	
13	Netherlands	9–11 November	Met with Foreign Minister Stef Blok.	
13	France	11–12 November	Met with President Emmanuel Macron and Foreign and European Affairs Minister Jean-Yves Le Drian. Attended the Paris Peace Forum conference.	
14	Japan	22–23 November	Attended G20 Foreign Ministers Meeting. Met with Japanese Foreign Minister Toshimitsu Motegi and other attending foreign ministers.	
15	Italy	6–8 December	Attended Fifth Mediterranean Dialogue. Met with Prime Minister Giuseppe Conte, and Foreign Minister Luigi Di Maio.	
16	United States	17–18 December	Attended the India-United States 2+2 Ministerial Dialogue along with Defence Minister Rajnath Singh. Met with Secretary of State Mike Pompeo and Defense Secretary Mark Esper.	
16	Canada	19–20 December	Met with Prime Minister Justin Trudeau, Foreign Minister François-Philippe Champagne, and International Trade Minister Mary Ng.	
17	Iran	22–23 December	Attended the 19th India-Iran Joint Commission. Met with President Hassan Rouhani and Foreign Minister Mohammad Javad Zarif.	
17	Oman	23–25 December	Met with Foreign Minister Yusuf bin Alawi bin Abdullah, Deputy Prime Minister Sayyid Fahd bin Mahmoud al Said, and Defence Minister Badr bin Saud al Busaidi.	

== 2020 ==
	Country	Date(s)	Details	Images
18	Niger	20–21 January	Met with President Mahamadou Issoufou, Prime Minister Brigi Rafini, and Foreign Affairs, Cooperation and Regional Integration Minister Kalla Ankourao. Inaugurated the Mahatma Gandhi International Convention Centre.	
18	Tunisia	22–23 January	Met with President Kais Saied, Parliament Speaker Rached Ghannouchi, and Foreign Minister Sabri Bachtobji.	
19	Germany	14–16 February	Attended the Munich Security Conference. Met with President Frank-Walter Steinmeier and other visiting foreign ministers.	
19	European Union; Belgium	17 February	Met with President of the European Council Charles Michel, Executive Vice President of the European Commission Frans Timmermans, Trade Commissioner Phil Hogan, International Partnership Commissioner Jutta Urpilainen, and Belgian Foreign and Defence Minister Philippe Goffin.	
20	Russia	9–10 September	Attending SCO Council of Foreign Ministers meeting. Met with Russian Foreign Minister Sergei Lavrov, Kyrgyz Foreign Minister Chingiz Aidarbekov, Tajik Foreign Minister Sirojiddin Muhriddin, Uzbek Foreign Minister Abdulaziz Kamilov, and Kazakh Foreign Minister Mukhtar Tleuberdi.	
21	Japan	6–7 October	Attended the 2nd India-Australia-Japan-USA Ministerial Meeting. Met with Japanese Foreign Minister Toshimitsu Motegi, United States Secretary of State Mike Pompeo, and Australian Foreign Minister Marise Payne.	
22	Bahrain	24–25 November	Met with Crown Prince and Prime Minister Salman bin Hamad Al Khalifa, Deputy Prime Minister Sheikh Ali bin Khalifa Al Khalifa, Foreign Minister Abdullatif bin Rashid Al Zayani.	
22	United Arab Emirates	25–26 November	Met with Crown Prince of Abu Dhabi Sheikh Mohamed bin Zayed Al Nahyan, Vice President and Prime Minister Sheikh Mohammed bin Rashid Al Maktoum, and Foreign Minister Abdullah bin Zayed Al Nahyan.	
22	Seychelles	27–28 November	Met with President Wavel Ramkalawan and Foreign and Tourism Minister Sylvestre Radegonde.	
23	Qatar	27–28 December	Met with Emir Tamim bin Hamad Al Thani, Father Emir Hamad bin Khalifa Al Thani, Prime Minister Khalid bin Khalifa bin Abdul Aziz Al Thani, and Deputy Prime Minister and Foreign Minister Mohammed bin Abdulrahman bin Jassim Al Thani.	

== 2021 ==
	Country	Date(s)	Details	Images
24	Sri Lanka	5–7 January	Met with President Gotabaya Rajapaksa, Prime Minister Mahinda Rajapaksa, and Foreign Minister Dinesh Gunawardena.	
25	Maldives	20–21 February	Met with President Ibrahim Mohamed Solih, Foreign Minister Abdulla Shahid, and Speaker of the Peoples Majlis, Mohamed Nasheed.	
25	Mauritius	22–23 February	Met with President Prithvirajsing Roopun, Prime Minister Pravind Jugnauth, and Foreign Minister Alan Ganoo.	
26	Bangladesh	4 March	Met with Prime Minister Sheikh Hasina and Foreign Minister AK Abdul Momen.	
27	Tajikistan	30–31 March	Met with President Emomali Rahmon and Foreign Minister Sirojiddin Muhriddin. Attended the 9th Ministerial Conference of Heart of Asia – Istanbul Process (HoA-IP) on Afghanistan.	
28	United Kingdom	3–6 May	Attended the G7 Outreach Foreign Ministers' Meeting. Met with Home Secretary Priti Patel, United States Secretary of State Antony Blinken, and South African Foreign Minister Naledi Pandor.	
29	United States	24–28 May	Met with Secretary of State Antony Blinken, Defense Secretary Lloyd Austin, National Security Advisor Jake Sullivan, and United Nations Secretary-General António Guterres.	
30	Kuwait	9–11 June	Met with Prime Minister Sabah Al-Khalid Al-Sabah and Foreign Minister Ahmad Nasser Al-Mohammad Al-Sabah.	
30	Kenya	12–14 June	Attended the 3rd India-Kenya Joint Commission meeting. Met with President Uhuru Kenyatta and Foreign Minister Raychelle Omamo.	
31	Greece	26–27 June	Met with Prime Minister Kyriakos Mitsotakis and Foreign Minister Nikos Dendias.	
32	Russia	7–9 July	Met with Foreign Minister Sergey Lavrov and Deputy Prime Minister Yury Borisov.	
32	Georgia	9–10 July	Met with Vice Prime Minister and Foreign Minister David Zalkaliani.	
33	Tajikistan	13–14 July	Attended the SCO Council of Foreign Ministers meeting. Met with Foreign Minister Sirojiddin Muhriddin.	
34	Iran	5–6 August	Attended the swearing-in ceremony of President Ebrahim Raisi.	
35	United Nations; United States	16–19 August	Visited during India's Presidency of the United Nations Security Council and presided over two high-level signature events, and a briefing session on the six-monthly report of the UN Secretary General on the threat posed by ISIL/Da'esh.	
36	Slovenia	2–3 September	Met with President Borut Pahor, Prime Minister Janez Janša, and Foreign Minister Anže Logar. Attended informal meeting of the Ministers of Foreign Affairs of EU Member States.	
36	Croatia	3 September	Met with Prime Minister Andrej Plenković and Foreign Minister Gordan Grlić-Radman.	
36	Denmark	4–5 September	Attended the 4th Denmark-India Joint Commission Meeting. Met with Queen Margrethe II, Prime Minister Mette Frederiksen, and Foreign Minister Jeppe Kofod.	
37	Mexico	26–28 September	Attended the 200th Mexican Independence anniversary celebrations. Met with President Andrés Manuel López Obrador and Foreign Minister Marcelo Ebrard.	
38	Kyrgyzstan	10–11 October	Met with President Sadyr Japarov and Foreign Minister Ruslan Kazakbayev.	
38	Kazakhstan	11–12 October	Attended the 6th CICA Ministerial meeting. Met with President Kassym-Jomart Tokayev and Foreign Minister Mukhtar Tleuberdi.	
38	Armenia	12–13 October	Met with Prime Minister Nikol Pashinyan, President of the National Assembly Alen Simonyan, and Foreign Minister Ararat Mirzoyan.	
39	Israel	17–21 October	Met with President Isaac Herzog, Prime Minister Naftali Bennett, Alternate Prime Minister and Foreign Minister Yair Lapid, and Knesset Speaker Mickey Levy.	
40	Italy	29–31 October	Accompanied Prime Minister Modi to the 16th G20 summit.	

== 2022 ==
	Country	Date(s)	Details	Images
41	Australia	10–13 February	Attended the 4th QUAD Foreign Ministers' Meeting and the 12th India-Australia Foreign Ministers' meeting. Met with Foreign Minister Marise Payne and other participating leaders.	
41	Philippines	13–15 February	Met with Foreign Secretary Teodoro Locsin Jr., Defence Secretary Delfin Lorenzana, Finance Secretary Carlos Dominguez III, and Agriculture Secretary William Dar.	
42	Germany	18–20 February	Attended the Munich Security Conference. Met with participating leaders.	
42	European Union; France	20–23 February	Attended the EU-India Ministerial Forum for Cooperation in the Indo-Pacific. Met with President Emmanuel Macron, Foreign Minister Jean-Yves Le Drian and Armed Forces Minister Florence Parly. Also met with other participating foreign ministers.	
43	Maldives	26–27 March	Met with President Ibrahim Mohamed Solih and Foreign Minister Abdulla Shahid.	
43	Sri Lanka	28–30 March	Attended the BIMSTEC Foreign Ministers' Meeting. Met with President Gotabaya Rajapaksa, Prime Minister Mahinda Rajapaksa, and Foreign Minister G. L. Peiris.	
44	United States	11–12 April	Attended the 4th India-United States 2+2 Ministerial Dialogue along with Defence Minister Rajnath Singh. Met with Secretary of State Antony Blinken and Defence Secretary Lloyd Austin.	
45	Bangladesh	28 April	Called on Prime Minister Sheikh Hasina and extended Prime Minister Modi's invitation to her for a visit to India. Also met Foreign Minister AK Abdul Momen.	
45	Bhutan	29–30 April	Met with King Jigme Khesar Namgyel Wangchuck, Prime Minister Lotay Tshering, and Foreign Minister Tandi Dorji.	
46	Germany	2 May	Accompanied Prime Minister Modi.	
46	Denmark	3–4 May	Accompanied Prime Minister Modi.	
46	France	4 May	Accompanied Prime Minister Modi.	
47	Japan	23–24 May	Accompanied Prime Minister Modi to the Quad Leaders' Summit.	
48	Slovakia	2–3 June	Attended the GLOBSEC 2022 Forum. Met with Prime Minister Eduard Heger and Foreign Minister Ivan Korčok. Also met with Austrian Foreign Minister Alexander Schallenberg and Montenegrin Milo Đukanović.	
48	Czech Republic	4–5 June	Met with Foreign Minister Jan Lipavský.	
49	Rwanda	22–25 June	Attended the 26th Commonwealth Heads of Government Meeting. Met with British Foreign Secretary Liz Truss, Canadian Foreign Minister Mélanie Joly, Sri Lankan Foreign Minister G. L. Peiris, New Zealander Foreign Minister Nanaia Mahuta, South African Foreign Minister Naledi Pandor.	
49	Germany	26–27 June	Accompanied Prime Minister Modi to the 48th G7 summit.	
50	Indonesia	7–8 July	Attended the G20 Foreign Ministers’ Meeting. Met with other visiting foreign ministers.	
51	Uzbekistan	28–29 July	Attended the SCO Council of Foreign Ministers' Meeting. Met with several visiting foreign ministers.	
52	Cambodia	3–4 August	Attended the ASEAN-India Foreign Ministers' Meeting, the 12th East Asia Summit Foreign Minister's Meeting and the 29th ASEAN Regional Forum Ministerial Meeting. Met with Prime Minister Hun Sen and other visiting foreign ministers.	
53	Thailand	16–18 August	Attended the 9th India-Thailand Joint Commission Meeting. Met with Prime Minister Prayut Chan-o-cha and Deputy Prime Minister and Foreign Minister Don Pramudwinai. Inaugurated the newly constructed embassy residence and residential complex in Bangkok.	
54	Paraguay	21–22 August	Met with President Mario Abdo Benítez, Foreign Minister Julio Cesar Arriola, and Commerce and Industry Minister Luis Castiglioni. Inaugurated the Indian Embassy in Asuncion.	
54	Brazil	23–25 August	Attended the 8th Brazil-India Joint Commission Meeting. Met with President Jair Bolsonaro and Foreign Minister Carlos Alberto França.	
54	Argentina	26–27 August	Attended the India-Argentina Joint Commission Meeting. Met with President Alberto Fernández and Foreign Affairs, International Trade and Worship Minister Santiago Cafiero.	
55	United Arab Emirates	31 August–2 September	Attended the 14th India-UAE Joint Commission Meeting and 3rd India-UAE Strategic Dialogue. Met with Foreign Minister Sheikh Abdullah bin Zayed Al Nahyan.	
56	Japan	7–10 September	Attended the 2nd India-Japan 2+2 Ministerial Meeting along with Defence Minister Rajnath Singh. Met with Prime Minister Fumio Kishida, Foreign Minister Yoshimasa Hayashi and Defence Minister Yasukazu Hamada.	
56	Saudi Arabia	10–12 September	Attended the Ministerial Meeting of the Committee on Political, Security, Social and Cultural Cooperation (PSSC). Met with Foreign Minister Prince Faisal bin Farhan Al Saud and Gulf Cooperation Council Secretary-General Nayef Falah Mubarak Al-Hajraf.	
57	Uzbekistan	15–16 September	Accompanied Prime Minister Modi to the 2022 SCO summit.	
58	United Nations; United States	18–28 September	Addressed the 77th United Nations General Assembly Session. Met with several visiting dignitaries and foreign ministers, UN Secretary General António Guterres and the President of the UN General Assembly Csaba Kőrösi. Also met with United States Secretary of State Antony Blinken.	
59	New Zealand	5–9 October	Met with Prime Minister Jacinda Ardern, Foreign Minister Nanaia Mahuta, Minister of Foreign Affairs, and Community and Youth Minister Priyanca Radhakrishnan. Inaugurated the newly constructed High Commission building.	
59	Australia	10–12 October	Attended the 13th Foreign Ministers' Framework Dialogue. Met with Deputy Prime Minister and Defence Minister Richard Marles and Foreign Minister Penny Wong.	
60	Egypt	15–16 October	Met with President Abdel Fattah el-Sisi, Foreign Minister Sameh Shoukry, and Arab League Secretary-General Ahmed Aboul Gheit.	
61	Russia	7–8 November	Met with Foreign Minister Sergey Lavrov and Deputy Prime Minister and Minister of Trade and Industry Denis Manturov.	
62	Cambodia	11–13 November	Accompanied Vice President Jagdeep Dhankhar to the 19th ASEAN-India summit.	
63	United States	13–15 December	Presided over two high-level ministerial events of India's United Nations Security Council presidency. Met with United Nations Secretary-General António Guterres and President of the United Nations General Assembly Csaba Kőrösi.	
64	Cyprus	29–31 December	Met with Acting President and House of Representatives President Annita Demetriou and Foreign Minister Ioannis Kasoulidis.	

== 2023 ==
	Country	Date(s)	Details	Images
65	Austria	31 December 2022 – 3 January 2023	Met with President Alexander Van der Bellen, Chancellor Karl Nehammer, Speaker of the Parliament Wolfgang Sobotka, and European and International Affairs Minister Alexander Schallenberg. Also met with Bulgarian President Rumen Radev, the foreign ministers of the Czech Republic and Slovakia, and International Atomic Energy Agency Director-General Rafael Grossi.	
66	Maldives	18–19 January	Met with President Ibrahim Mohamed Solih and Foreign Minister Abdulla Shahid.	
66	Sri Lanka	19–20 January	Met with President Ranil Wickremesinghe, Prime Minister Dinesh Gunawardena, and Foreign Minister Ali Sabry.	
67	Fiji	15–17 February	Attend the 12th World Hindi Conference. Met with President Wiliame Katonivere, Prime Minister Sitiveni Rabuka, and Education Minister Aseri Radrodro.	
67	Australia	18 February	Met with Prime Minister Anthony Albanese, Deputy Prime Minister and Defence Minister Richard Marles and Foreign Minister Penny Wong.	
68	Uganda	10–12 April	Met with President Yoweri Museveni, Deputy Prime Minister Lukia Isanga Nakadama, Foreign Minister Jeje Odongo, Defence Minister Vincent Ssempijja, and other ministers. Inaugurated the first overseas campus of the National Forensic Sciences University.	
68	Ethiopia	13 April	Transit visit. Met with Deputy Prime Minister and Foreign Minister Demeke Mekonnen.	
68	Mozambique	13–15 April	Attended the 5th India-Mozambique Joint Commission Meeting. Met with President Filipe Nyusi, Foreign Minister Verónica Macamo, and other ministers.	
69	Guyana	21–23 April	Attended the India-Guyana Joint Commission Meeting and India-COFCOR Foreign Ministers Meeting. Met with President Irfaan Ali, Second Vice President Bharrat Jagdeo, and Foreign Minister Hugh Todd. Also met with foreign ministers from CARICOM countries.	
69	Panama	24–25 April	Met with President Laurentino Cortizo and Foreign Minister Janaina Tewaney. Attended the India-SICA Foreign Ministerial Meeting.	
69	Colombia	25–27 April	Met with Foreign Minister Alvaro Leyva Duran.	
69	Dominican Republic	27–29 April	Met with President Luis Abinader and Foreign Minister Roberto Alvarez. Inaugurated the Indian resident mission in Santo Domingo.	
70	Bangladesh	11–12 May	Attended the 6th Indian Ocean Conference. Met with Prime Minister Sheikh Hasina, Mauritian President Prithvirajsing Roopun, and Maldivian Vice President Faisal Naseem.	
70	European Union; Sweden	13–15 May	Attended the 2nd EU-Indo-Pacific Ministerial Forum. Met with Prime Minister Ulf Kristersson, Speaker of the Riksdag Andreas Norlén, Foreign Minister Tobias Billström, and several visiting foreign ministers. Also attended Trilateral India Forum.	
70	European Union; Belgium	15–16 May	Attended the 1st India-EU Trade and Technology Council Ministerial Meeting along with Commerce and Industry Minister Piyush Goyal and Minister of State Rajeev Chandrasekhar.	
71	Japan	19–21 May	Accompanied Prime Minister Modi to the 49th G7 summit and QUAD Leaders' Summit.	
71	Papua New Guinea	21–22 May	Accompanied Prime Minister Modi to the 3rd FIPIC Summit.	
71	Australia	22–24 May	Accompanied Prime Minister Modi.	
72	South Africa	1–3 June	Attended the BRICS Foreign Ministers meeting. Met with President Cyril Ramaphosa, Foreign Minister Naledi Pandor, and other participating foreign ministers.	
72	Namibia	4–6 June	Met with President Hage Geingob and Deputy Prime Minister and Foreign Minister Netumbo Nandi-Ndaitwah.	
73	United States	20–23 June	Accompanied Prime Minister Modi.	
73	Egypt	24–25 June	Accompanied Prime Minister Modi.	
74	Tanzania	5–8 July	Attended the 10th India-Tanzania Joint Commission Meeting. Met with President Samia Suluhu and Foreign and East African Cooperation Minister Stergomena Tax. Also met with President of Zanzibar Hussein Mwinyi.	
75	South Africa	22–24 August	Accompanied Prime Minister Modi to the 15th BRICS summit.	
75	Greece	25 August	Accompanied Prime Minister Modi.	
76	Indonesia	5–7 September	Accompanied Prime Minister Modi to the 18th East Asia Summit and the ASEAN-India Summit.	
77	United Nations; United States	22–30 September	Attended the 78th United Nations General Assembly Session. Met with UN Secretary General António Guterres, President of the UN General Assembly Dennis Francis, and several visiting leaders. ALso met with United States Secretary of State Antony Blinken.	
78	Sri Lanka	10–12 October	Attended the 23rd Indian Ocean Rim Association Council of Ministers' meeting. Met with President Ranil Wickremesinghe.	
79	Vietnam	15–18 October	Attended the 18th India-Vietnam Joint Commission meeting. Met with Prime Minister Phạm Minh Chính and Foreign Minister Bùi Thanh Sơn.	
79	Singapore	18–21 October	Met with President Tharman Shanmugaratnam, Deputy Prime Minister and Finance Minister Lawrence Wong, Foreign Minister Vivian Balakrishnan, and other senior ministers.	
80	Kyrgyzstan	25–26 October	Attended SCO Council of Heads of Government summit. Met with President Sadyr Japarov and Foreign Minister Jeenbek Kulubayev.	
81	Portugal	31 October–1 November	Met with Prime Minister António Costa, President of Parliament Augusto Santos Silva, and Foreign Minister João Gomes Cravinho.	
81	Italy	2–3 November	Met with President Sergio Mattarella, Foreign Minister Antonio Tajani, Defence Minister Guido Crosetto, and Business and Made in Italy Minister Adolfo Urso.	
82	United Kingdom	11–15 November	Met with Prime Minister Rishi Sunak, Foreign Secretary David Cameron, Home Secretary James Cleverly, Defence Secretary Grant Shapps, and National Security Adviser Tim Barrow. Attended Diwali reception at Indian High Commission and visited BAPS Shri Swaminarayan Mandir London.	
83	Russia	25–29 December	Met with President Vladimir Putin, Deputy Prime Minister and Trade and Industry Minister Denis Manturov, and Foreign Minister Sergey Lavrov.	

== 2024 ==
	Country	Date(s)	Details	Images
84	Nepal	4–5 January	Attended the 7th India-Nepal Joint Commission meeting. Met with President Ram Chandra Poudel, Prime Minister Pushpa Kamal Dahal, and Foreign Minister Narayan Prakash Saud.	
85	Iran	14–15 January	Met with President Ebrahim Raisi, Foreign Minister Hossein Amir-Abdollahian, Roads and Urban Development Minister Mehrdad Bazrpash, and Supreme National Security Council Chairman Ali Akbar Ahmadian.	
86	Uganda	19–20 January	Attended the 19th Non-Aligned Movement summit. Met with President Yoweri Museveni, Foreign Minister Jeje Odongo, and other visiting leaders.	
86	Nigeria	21–23 January	Attended the 6th India-Nigeria Joint Commission Meeting along with Foreign Minister Yusuf Tuggar.	
87	Australia	9–10 February	Attended 7th Indian Ocean Conference. Met wit Sri Lankan President Ranil Wickremesinghe, Australian Foreign Minister Penny Wong, and Singaporean Foreign Minister Vivian Balakrishnan.	
88	United Arab Emirates	13–14 February	Accompanied Prime Minister Modi.	
88	Qatar	14–15 February	Accompanied Prime Minister Modi.	
89	Germany	16–18 February	Attended the Munich Security Conference. Met with Foreign Minister Annalena Baerbock, United States Secretary of State Antony Blinken, and other participating foreign ministers.	
90	South Korea	5–7 March	Attended the 10th India-South Korea Joint Commission Meeting. Met with Prime Minister Han Duck-soo, Foreign Minister Cho Tae-yul, and Trade, Industry and Energy Minister Ahn Duk-geun.	
90	Japan	7–9 March	Attended the 16th India-Japan Strategic Dialogue. Met with Prime Minister Fumio Kishida, and Foreign Minister Yōko Kamikawa.	
91	Singapore	23–25 March	Met with Prime Minister Lee Hsien Loong, Deputy Prime Minister and Finance Minister Lawrence Wong, Senior Minister and Coordinating Minister for National Security Teo Chee Hean, Foreign Minister Vivian Balakrishnan, Trade and Industry Minister Gan Kim Yong, and Home Affairs and Law Minister K. Shanmugam.	
91	Philippines	25–27 March	Met with President Bongbong Marcos, Foreign Secretary Enrique Manalo, and National Defense Secretary Gilbert Teodoro.	
91	Malaysia	27–28 March	Met with Prime Minister Anwar Ibrahim, Foreign Minister Mohamad Hasan and Digital Minister Gobind Singh Deo.	
92	Italy	13–14 June	Accompanied Prime Minister Modi to the 50th G7 summit.	
93	Sri Lanka	20 June	First bilateral visit following re-appointment. Met with President Ranil Wickremesinghe, Prime Minister Dinesh Gunawardena, and Foreign Minister Ali Sabry.	
94	United Arab Emirates	23 June	Met with Foreign Minister Abdullah bin Zayed Al Nahyan. Participated in celebrations of 10th International Day of Yoga and visited BAPS Hindu Mandir Abu Dhabi.	
95	Qatar	30 June	Met with Prime Minister and Foreign Minister Mohammed bin Abdulrahman bin Jassim Al Thani.	
96	Kazakhstan	4 July	Attended 2024 SCO summit. Met with Chinese Foreign Minister Wang Yi.	
97	Russia	8–9 July	Accompanied Prime Minister Modi.	
97	Austria	9–10 July	Accompanied Prime Minister Modi.	
98	Mauritius	16–17 July	Met with Prime Minister Pravind Jugnauth, Finance, Economic Planning and Development Minister Renganaden Padayachy, Industrial Development, SMEs and Cooperatives Minister Soomilduth Bholah, Foreign Minister and Attorney General Maneesh Gobin.	
99	Laos	25–27 July	Attended Foreign Ministers' Meeting under ASEAN-India, East Asia Summit and ASEAN Regional Forum.	
99	Japan	28–30 July	Attended Quad Foreign Ministers' meeting. Met with Foreign Minister Yōko Kamikawa, Australian Foreign Minister Penny Wong and United States Secretary of State Antony Blinken. Unveiled bust of Mahatma Gandhi in Edogawa.	
100	Maldives	9–11 August	Met with President Mohamed Muizzu, Foreign Minister Moosa Zameer, Finance Minister Mohamed Shafeeq, Economic Development and Trade Minister Mohamed Saeed and Maldives Monetary Authority Governor Ahmed Munawar.	
101	Kuwait	18 August	Met with Crown Prince Sabah Al-Khalid Al-Sabah, Prime Minister Ahmad Al-Abdullah Al-Sabah, and Foreign Minister Abdullah Al-Yahya.	
102	Poland	21–22 August	Accompanied Prime Minister Modi.	
102	Ukraine	23–24 August	Accompanied Prime Minister Modi.	
103	Brunei	3–4 September	Accompanied Prime Minister Modi.	
103	Singapore	4–5 September	Accompanied Prime Minister Modi.	
104	Saudi Arabia	8–9 September	Attended the First India-GCC Joint Ministerial Meeting for Strategic Dialogue. Met with Saudi Foreign Minister Faisal bin Farhan Al Saud, Omani Foreign Minister Badr bin Hamad Al Busaidi, Kuwaiti Foreign Minister Abdullah Al-Yahya, and Bahraini Foreign Minister Abdullatif bin Rashid Al Zayani.	
104	Germany	10–11 September	Attended Munich Security Conference. Met with Chancellor Olaf Scholz, Foreign Minister Annalena Baerbock, and other political leaders.	
104	Switzerland	12–13 September	Met with Federal Councillor for Foreign Affairs Ignazio Cassis, UNHCR Volker Türk, and WHO Director-General Tedros Adhanom Ghebreyesus. Inaugurated the newly built Permanent Mission of India in Geneva.	
105	United Nations; United States	21 September–1 October	Accompanied Prime Minister Modi to Quad Leaders' Summit and United Nations Summit of the Future. Met with United States Secretary of State Antony Blinken and other visiting leaders.	
106	Sri Lanka	4 October	Met with President Anura Kumara Dissanayake, Prime Minister Harini Amarasuriya, and Foreign Minister Vijitha Herath.	
107	Laos	10–11 October	Accompanied Prime Minister Modi to the 19th East Asia Summit.	
108	Pakistan	15–16 October	Attended SCO Council of Heads of Government Meeting. Met with Prime Minister Shehbaz Sharif, Deputy Prime Minister and Foreign Minister Ishaq Dar, Mongolian Prime Minister Luvsannamsrain Oyun-Erdene, and other participating leaders.	
109	Russia	22–24 October	Accompanied Prime Minister Modi to the 16th BRICS summit. Met with Malaysian Economy Minister Rafizi Ramli, Indonesian Foreign Minister Sugiono, and Iranian Foreign Minister Abbas Araghchi. Later participated in BRICS Outreach session.	
110	Australia	3–7 November	Attended the 15th Australia-India Foreign Ministers' Framework Dialogue. Met with Prime Minister Anthony Albanese, Deputy Prime Minister and Defence Minister Richard Marles, and Leader of Opposition Peter Dutton. Inaugurated the Consulate-General in Queensland along with Queensland Governor Jeanette Young. Also met with New Zealand Deputy Prime Minister Winston Peters.	
110	Singapore	8–9 November	Met with President Tharman Shanmugaratnam, Prime Minister Lawrence Wong, Deputy Prime Minister Gan Kim Yong, Foreign Minister Vivian Balakrishnan, and Defence Minister Ng Eng Hen.	
111	United Arab Emirates	14 November	Met with Deputy Prime Minister and Foreign Minister Abdullah bin Zayed Al Nahyan. Inaugurated the Symbiosis International University Dubai campus along with Nahyan bin Mubarak Al Nahyan. Visited the BAPS Hindu Mandir Abu Dhabi.	
111	Nigeria	16–17 November	Accompanied Prime Minister Modi.	
111	Brazil	18–19 November	Accompanied Prime Minister Modi to the 19th G20 summit. Met with Chinese Foreign Minister Wang Yi.	
111	Guyana	19–21 November	Accompanied Prime Minister Modi to the 2nd CARICOM-India Meeting.	
112	Italy	24–26 November	Attended the outreach session of the G7 Foreign Ministers’ Meeting and the 10th MED Mediterranean Dialogue. Met with Deputy Prime Minister and Foreign Minister Antonio Tajani and other participating foreign ministers. Inaugurated the new premises of the Indian Embassy in Rome.	
113	Qatar	6–8 December	Attended the 22nd edition of Doha Forum. Met with Prime Minister and Foreign Minister Sheikh Mohammed bin Abdulrahman bin Jassim Al Thani, Commerce and Industry Minister Sheikh Faisal bin Thani bin Faisal Al Thani, and Minister of State Ahmed Al Sayed.	
113	Bahrain	8–10 December	Attended the 4th India-Bahrain High Joint Commission Meeting. Met with Deputy Prime Minister Shaikh Khalid bin Abdullah Al Khalifa and Foreign Minister Abdullatif bin Rashid Al Zayani.	
114	Kuwait	21–22 December	Accompanied Prime Minister Modi.	
115	United States	24–29 December	Met with Secretary of State Antony Blinken and National Security Advisor Jake Sullivan. Chaired a conference of the Consuls General of India in the United States.	

== 2025 ==
	Country	Date(s)	Details	Images
116	Spain	13–14 January	Met with King Felipe VI, President of the Government Pedro Sanchez, and Foreign Minister José Manuel Albares.	
117	United States	20–22 January	Attended the second inauguration of Donald Trump. Met with Secretary of State Marco Rubio, Japanese Foreign Minister Takeshi Iwaya, and Australian Foreign Minister Penny Wong.	
118	United Arab Emirates	27–29 January	Met with President Sheikh Mohamed bin Zayed Al Nahyan, Crown Prince of Abu Dhabi Sheikh Khaled bin Mohamed Al Nahyan, Crown Prince of Dubai, Deputy Prime Minister and Minister of Defence Sheikh Hamdan bin Mohammed Al Maktoum, and Deputy Prime Minister and Foreign Minister Sheikh Abdullah bin Zayed Al Nahyan. Attended the 1st Raisina Middle East Conference.	
119	France	10–12 February	Accompanied Prime Minister Modi to the AI Action Summit. Met with Foreign Minister Jean-Noël Barrot.	
119	United States	12–14 February	Accompanied Prime Minister Modi.	
119	Germany	15 February	Attended the Munich Security Conference. Met with several visiting leaders.	
119	Oman	16 February	Attended the 8th Indian Ocean Conference. Met with Foreign Minister Sayyid Badr bin Hamad Al Busaidi and other visiting foreign ministers.	
120	South Africa	20–21 February	Attended the G20 Foreign Ministers' Meeting. Met with President Cyril Ramaphosa, Foreign Minister Ronald Lamola, and other participating foreign ministers.	
121	United Kingdom	4–6 March	Met with Prime Minister Sir Keir Starmer, Foreign Secretary David Lammy, Business and Trade Secretary Jonathan Reynolds and Home Secretary Yvette Cooper. Inaugurated India's Consulate General in Manchester.	
121	Ireland	6–7 March	Met with President Michael D. Higgins and Tánaiste and Minister of Foreign Affairs, Trade and Defence Simon Harris.	
121	United Kingdom	8–9 March	Inaugurated Indian Consulate General in Belfast and met with Northern Irish leaders.	
122	Mauritius	11–12 March	Accompanied Prime Minister Modi.	
123	Thailand	3–4 April	Accompanied Prime Minister Modi to the 6th BIMSTEC Summit.	
123	Sri Lanka	4–6 April	Accompanied Prime Minister Modi.	
124	Saudi Arabia	22 April	Accompanied Prime Minister Modi.	
125	Netherlands	19–20 May	Met with Prime Minister Dick Schoof, Foreign Minister Caspar Veldkamp and Defence Minister Ruben Brekelmans.	
125	Denmark	20–21 May	Met with Prime Minister Mette Frederiksen, Speaker of the Danish Parliament Søren Gade, Foreign Minister Lars Løkke Rasmussen, and Industry, Business and Financial Affairs Minister Morten Bødskov.	
125	Germany	22–24 May	Met with Chancellor Friedrich Merz, Foreign Minister Johann Wadephul, and Economy and Energy Minister Katherina Reiche.	
126	European Union; Belgium	9–11 June	Met with Belgian King Philippe, Prime Minister Bart De Wever, and Deputy Prime Minister and Foreign Minister Maxime Prévot. Met with President of the European Commission Ursula von der Leyen, President of the European Parliament Roberta Metsola. Co-chaired the first India-EU Strategic Dialogue with EU High Representative and Vice President Kaja Kallas. Also met European Commissioners for Defence Industry and Space Andrius Kubilius, Trade and Economic Security Maroš Šefčovič, and International Partnerships Jozef Síkela.	
126	France	11–14 June	Met with President Emmanuel Macron and Europe and Foreign Affairs Minister Jean-Noël Barrot. Participated in the inaugural edition of the Mediterranean Raisina Dialogue. Also met Armenian Foreign Minister Ararat Mirzoyan.	
126	Cyprus	15–16 June	Accompanied Prime Minister Modi.	
126	Canada	16–17 June	Accompanied Prime Minister Modi to the 51st G7 summit.	
126	Croatia	18 June	Accompanied Prime Minister Modi.	
127	United States	30 June–2 July	Attended the QUAD Foreign Ministers Meeting. Met with Secretary of State Marco Rubio, Defense Secretary Pete Hegseth, and other participating foreign ministers.	
128	Trinidad and Tobago	3–4 July	Accompanied Prime Minister Modi.	
128	Argentina	4–5 July	Accompanied Prime Minister Modi.	
128	Brazil	5–8 July	Accompanied Prime Minister Modi to the 17th BRICS summit.	
128	Namibia	9 July	Accompanied Prime Minister Modi.	
129	Singapore	13 July	Met President of Singapore Tharman Shanmugaratnam and had meetings with Deputy Prime Minister and Minister for Trade & Industry Gan Kim Yong and Minister for Foreign Affairs Vivian Balakrishnan. He also met Teo Chee Hean, former Senior Minister and Chairman of Temasek Holdings.	
129	China	14–15 July	Attended the SCO Foreign Ministers Meeting. Met with President Xi Jinping, Vice President Han Zheng, Foreign Minister Wang Yi and other participating foreign ministers.	
130	United Kingdom	23–24 July	Accompanied Prime Minister Modi.	
130	Maldives	24–25 July	Accompanied Prime Minister Modi.	
131	Russia	19–21 August	Attended the India–Russia Inter-Governmental Commission Meeting. Met with President Vladimir Putin, First Deputy Prime Minister Denis Manturov, and Foreign Minister Sergey Lavrov.	
132	United Nations; United States	21–27 September	Attended the Eightieth session of the United Nations General Assembly, held talk with various foreign delegates on sideline meetings.	
133	Malaysia	25–27 October	20th East Asia Summit and 22nd ASEAN–India Summit	
134	Canada	11–13 November	Participated in the G7 Foreign Ministers’ Meeting.	
135	Russia	17–18 November	Participated in the SCO Council of Heads of Government Meeting, inaugurated Indian consulates in Kazan and Yekaterinburg.	
136	United Arab Emirates	13–15 December	16th India–UAE Joint Commission Meeting	
136	Israel	16–17 December	Met Israeli President Issac Herzog and Prime Minister Benjamin Netanyahu.	
136	Oman	17–18 December	Accompanied Prime Minister Modi.	
137	Sri Lanka	22–23 December	Met with the Sri Lankan Foreign Minister Vijitha Herath. Addressed the devastation caused by Cyclone Ditwah.	
138	Bangladesh	31 December	Attended the state funeral of Khaleda Zia.	

== 2026 ==
	Country	Date(s)	Details	Images
139	France	4–7 January	Met Minister for Foreign Affairs Jean Noel Barrot.	
139	Luxembourg	7–9 January	Met Deputy Prime Minister Xavier Bettel.	
140	United States	2–4 February	Participated in the Critical Minerals Ministerial convened by United States Secretary of State Marco Rubio.	
141	Germany	13–15 February	Participated in the Munich Security Conference and the G4 nations foreign ministers summit.	
142	Israel	25–26 February	Accompanied Prime Minister Modi.	
143	European Union; Belgium	15–16 March	Met with EU High Representative Kaja Kallas.	
144	Mauritius	9–10 April	Participated in the 9th Indian Ocean Conference.	
144	United Arab Emirates	11–12 April	Met the UAE leadership.	
145	Jamaica	2–5 May	Official visit	
145	Suriname	6–7 May	Official visit	
145	Trinidad and Tobago	8–10 May	Official visit	
146	Netherlands	16–17 May	Accompanied Prime Minister Modi.	
146	Sweden	17–18 May	Accompanied Prime Minister Modi.	
146	Norway	18–19 May	Accompanied Prime Minister Modi.	
146	Italy	19–20 May	Accompanied Prime Minister Modi.	
147	Cyprus	27–28 May	Met with EU High Representative and Vice President Kaja Kallas, President of Cyprus Nikos Christodoulides, and Foreign Minister of Cyprus Constantinos Kombos.	
148	Bulgaria	10 June	Met with Bulgarian leaders.	
148	Finland	11 June	Met with Finnish leaders.	
148	France	13–14 June	Accompanied Prime Minister Modi.	
148	Slovakia	14–16 June	Accompanied Prime Minister Modi.	
148	France	16–18 June	Accompanied Prime Minister Modi.	
149	Mongolia	22–23 June	Met with the Mongolian leadership and held discussions with Foreign Minister of Mongolia Battsetseg Batmunkh.	
149	South Korea	24–25 June	Met Foreign Minister of South Korea Cho Hyun. Attended the Jeju Forum for Peace and Prosperity in Jeju.	
150	Seychelles	27–29 June	Accompanied Prime Minister Modi.	
151	Qatar	5–6 July	Official visit	
151	Bahrain	6–7 July	Official visit	
151	Kuwait	8–10 July	Official visit	
151	Oman	10 July	Official visit	
151	United Nations; United States	11–13 July	To launch India's official campaign for the 2028–29 United Nations Security Council tenure.	
151	European Union; Belgium	14–15 July	To join the 3rd India-European Union Trade and Technology Council meeting.	
152	Philippines	22–23 July	ASEAN–Quad Foreign Ministerial Meeting.	
153	Singapore	20 August	India–Singapore Ministerial Roundtable	
154	Russia	23–24 August	To attend the India-Russia Inter-Governmental Commission on Trade, Economic, Scientific, Technological and Cultural Cooperation.	
155	Uzbekistan	29–30 August	Accompanied Prime Minister Modi.	
155	Kyrgyzstan	31 August–1 September	Accompanied Prime Minister Modi to the 2026 Bishkek SCO summit.	
155	Ukraine	3–4 September	Met with the Foreign Minister of Ukraine, Andrii Sybiha.	
155	Poland	4–5 September	Met with the Deputy Prime Minister and Foreign Minister of Poland Radoslaw Sikorski.	
156	Bhutan	16–17 September	Met King Jigme Khesar Namgyel Wangchuck and Prime Minister Tshering Tobgay.	
157	United Nations; United States	20 September–3 October	Attended the Eighty-first session of the United Nations General Assembly, held talk with various foreign delegates on sideline meetings.	
158	Ghana	6–8 October	Official visit	
158	Ivory Coast	8–9 October	Official visit	
158	Ethiopia	9–10 October	Official visit	
159	United Arab Emirates	14–16 October	Attended the Raisina Dialogues Middle East.	
160	Azerbaijan	23 October	Official visit	
161	United States	30–31 October	Attended the Quad Foreign Ministers meet.	
161	Antigua and Barbuda	1–4 November	Attended the 2026 Commonwealth Heads of Government Meeting.	
162	Japan	18–19 November	Official visit for the fourth India-Japan 2+2 Dialogue.	

== See also ==
- List of international presidential trips made by Ram Nath Kovind
- List of international presidential trips made by Droupadi Murmu
- List of international prime ministerial trips made by Narendra Modi
- History of Indian foreign relations
