= General debate of the seventy-eighth session of the United Nations General Assembly =

- 19 – 26 September 2023 78th session 78th general debate

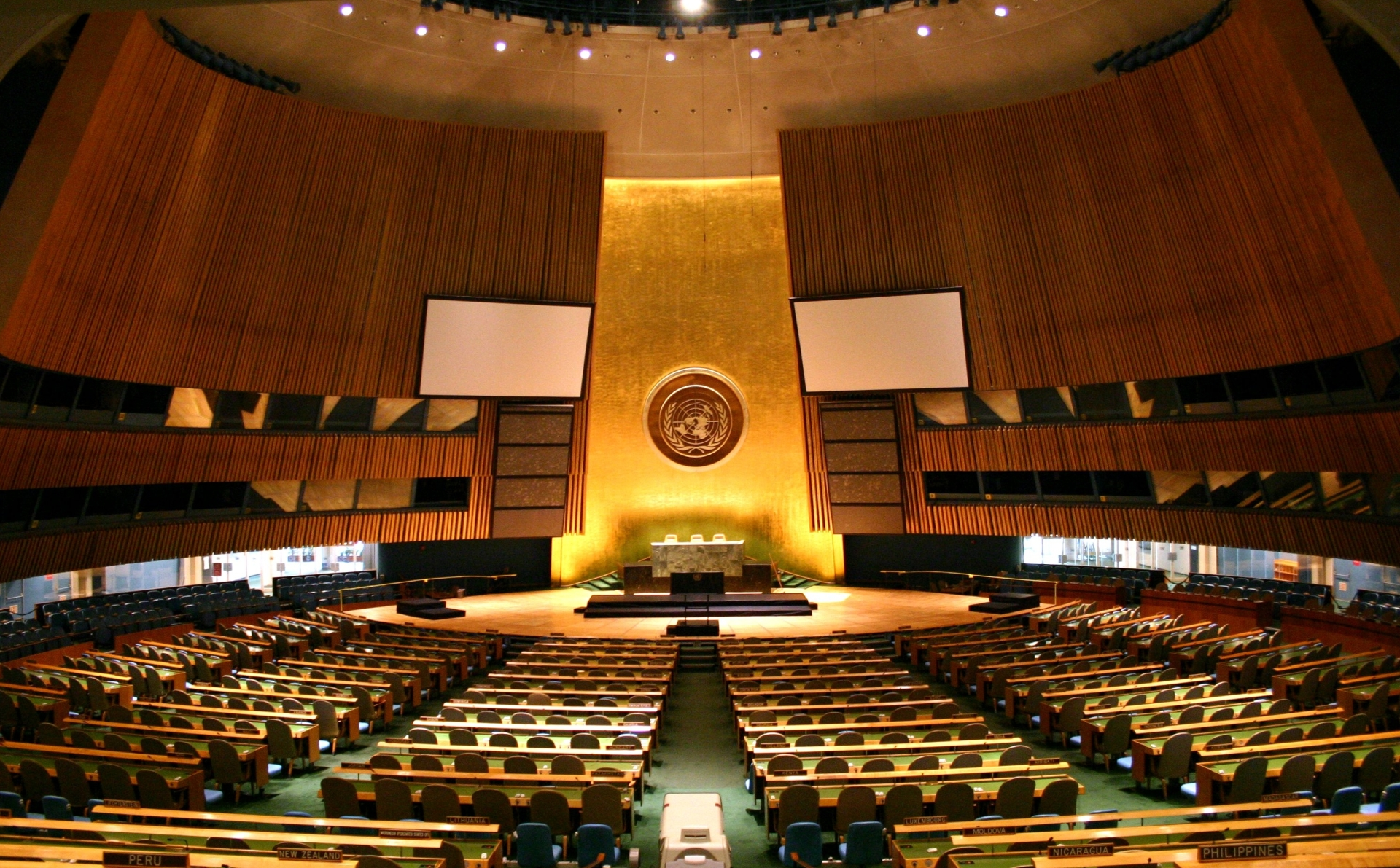
- General Assembly Hall at United Nations Headquarters, New York City
- Host country: United Nations
- Cities: New York City, United States
- Venues: General Assembly Hall at the United Nations Headquarters
- Participants: United Nations Member States
- President: Dennis Francis
- Secretary-General: António Guterres

The General debate of the seventy-eighth session of the United Nations General Assembly (UNGA) opened on 19 September and ran until 26 September 2023. Leaders from a number of member states addressed the UNGA.

== Organisation and subjects ==
The order of speakers is given first to member states, then observer states and supranational bodies. Any other observer entities will have a chance to speak at the end of the debate, if they so choose. Speakers will be put on the list in the order of their request, with special consideration for ministers and other government officials of similar or higher rank. According to the rules in place for the General Debate, the statements should be in one of the United Nations official languages (Arabic, Chinese, English, French, Russian or Spanish) and will be translated and interpreted by United Nations translators and interpreters. Each speaker is requested to provide 20 advance copies of their statements to the conference officers to facilitate translation and to be presented at the podium. The theme for this year's debate was chosen by President Dennis Francis as: "Rebuilding trust and reigniting global solidarity: Accelerating action on the 2030 Agenda and its Sustainable Development Goals towards peace, prosperity, progress and sustainability for all".

== Speaking schedule ==
Since 1955, Brazil and the United States are traditionally the first and second countries to speak. Other countries follow according to a speaking schedule issued by the Secretariat.

The list of speakers is provided by both the daily UN Journal, while changes in order are also reflected by the UNGA General Debate website.

=== 19 September ===
==== Morning session ====
- United Nations – Secretary-General António Guterres (Report of the UN Secretary-General)
- United Nations – 78th Session of the United Nations General Assembly - President Dennis Francis (Opening statement)
- Brazil – President Luiz Inácio Lula da Silva
- United States – President Joe Biden
- Colombia – President Gustavo Petro
- Jordan – King Abdullah II
- Poland – President Andrzej Duda
- Cuba – First Secretary and President Miguel Díaz-Canel
- Turkey – President Recep Tayyip Erdoğan
- Portugal – President Marcelo Rebelo de Sousa
- Qatar – Emir Tamim bin Hamad Al Thani
- South Africa – President Cyril Ramaphosa
- Turkmenistan – President Serdar Berdimuhamedov (Note: First speech to the UNGA General Debate.)
- Ukraine – President Volodymyr Zelenskyy
- Guatemala – President Alejandro Giammattei
- Hungary – President Katalin Novák
- Switzerland – President Alain Berset
- Slovenia – President Nataša Pirc Musar
- Uzbekistan – President Shavkat Mirziyoyev

==== Evening session ====
- Bolivia – President Luis Arce
- Kazakhstan – President Kassym-Jomart Tokayev
- Iran – President Ebrahim Raisi
- Algeria – President Abdelmadjid Tebboune
- Argentina – President Alberto Fernández
- El Salvador – President Nayib Bukele
- Kyrgyzstan – President Sadyr Zhaparov
- Paraguay – President Santiago Peña
- Peru – President Dina Boluarte
- Mozambique – President Filipe Nyusi
- Panama – President Laurentino Cortizo
- Nigeria – President Bola Tinubu
- Uruguay – President Luis Lacalle Pou
- Czech Republic – President Petr Pavel
- Palau – President Surangel Whipps Jr.
- Senegal – President Macky Sall
- Germany – Chancellor Olaf Scholz
- Japan – Prime Minister Fumio Kishida

=== 20 September ===
==== Morning session ====
- Seychelles – President Wavel Ramkalawan
- Rwanda – President Paul Kagame
- Cyprus – President Nikos Christodoulides
- Namibia – President Hage Geingob
- Romania – President Klaus Iohannis
- Suriname – President Chan Santokhi
- Bosnia and Herzegovina – Chairman of the Presidency Željko Komšić
- Ghana – President Nana Akufo-Addo
- Lithuania – President Gitanas Nausėda
- Slovakia – President Zuzana Čaputová
- Finland – President Sauli Niinistö
- Bulgaria – President Rumen Radev
- Guyana – President Irfaan Ali
- Croatia – President Zoran Milanović
- Ecuador – President Guillermo Lasso
- Angola – President João Lourenço
- Latvia – President Edgars Rinkēvičs
- South Korea – President Yoon Suk-yeol
- Tajikistan – President Emomali Rahmon
- Honduras – President Xiomara Castro

==== Evening session ====
- Estonia – President Alar Karis
- Comoros – President Azali Assoumani
- Dominican Republic – President Luis Abinader
- Moldova – President Maia Sandu
- Sierra Leone – President Julius Maada Bio
- Monaco – Prince Albert II
- Chile – President Gabriel Boric
- Mongolia – President Ukhnaagiin Khürelsükh
- Mauritania – President Mohamed Ould Ghazouani
- Liberia – President George Weah
- Democratic Republic of the Congo – President Félix Tshisekedi
- Eswatini – King Mswati III
- Marshall Islands – President David Kabua
- Botswana – President Mokgweetsi Masisi
- Italy – Prime Minister Giorgia Meloni
- Spain – Prime Minister Pedro Sánchez
- São Tomé and Príncipe – Prime Minister Patrice Trovoada
- Belgium – Prime Minister Alexander De Croo
- Lebanon – Prime Minister Najib Mikati
- Libya – Youth Minister Fathallah al-Zani

=== 21 September ===
==== Morning session ====
- Yemen – President of the Presidential Leadership Council Rashad al-Alimi
- Central African Republic – President Faustin-Archange Touadéra
- Malawi – President Lazarus Chakwera
- Kiribati – President Taneti Maamau
- Zimbabwe – President Emmerson Mnangagwa
- East Timor – President José Ramos-Horta
- South Sudan – President Salva Kiir
- Guinea – President Mamady Doumbouya
- Burundi – President Évariste Ndayishimiye
- Serbia – President Aleksandar Vučić
- Dominica – President Charles Savarin
- Sri Lanka – President Ranil Wickremesinghe
- Republic of Congo – President Denis Sassou Nguesso
- Kenya – President William Ruto
- Federated States of Micronesia – President Wesley Simina
- Montenegro – President Jakov Milatović
- Palestine (State of) – President Mahmoud Abbas
- European Union – President of the European Council Charles Michel

==== Evening session ====
- Nauru – President Russ Kun
- Guinea-Bissau – President Umaro Sissoco Embaló
- Albania – President Bajram Begaj
- Sudan – President Abdel Fattah al-Burhan
- China – Vice President Han Zheng
- Ivory Coast – Vice President Tiémoko Meyliet Koné
- Uganda – Vice President Jessica Alupo
- Gambia – Vice President Muhammad B. S. Jallow
- Equatorial Guinea – Vice President Teodoro Nguema
- Tanzania – Vice President Philip Mpango
- Trinidad and Tobago – Prime Minister Keith Rowley
- Greece – Prime Minister Kyriakos Mitsotakis
- Nepal – Prime Minister Pushpa Kamal Dahal
- Kuwait – Prime Minister Ahmad Nawaf Al-Ahmad Al-Sabah
- France – Foreign Minister Catherine Colonna
- Austria – Foreign Minister Alexander Schallenberg
- Chad – Foreign Minister Mahamat Saleh Annadif
- Togo – Foreign Minister Robert Dussey
- Denmark – Development and Climate Change Minister Dan Jørgensen
- Liechtenstein – Foreign Minister Dominique Hasler

=== 22 September ===
==== Morning session ====
- North Macedonia – President Stevo Pendarovski
- Israel – Prime Minister Benjamin Netanyahu
- Mauritius – Prime Minister Pravind Jugnauth
- Malaysia – Prime Minister Anwar Ibrahim
- Malta – Prime Minister Robert Abela
- Netherlands – Prime Minister Mark Rutte
- Pakistan – Prime Minister Anwaar ul Haq Kakar
- Barbados – Prime Minister Mia Mottley
- Thailand – Prime Minister Srettha Thavisin
- Andorra – Prime Minister Xavier Espot Zamora
- Saint Lucia – Prime Minister Philip J. Pierre
- Fiji – Prime Minister Sitiveni Rabuka
- Luxembourg – Prime Minister Xavier Bettel
- Bangladesh – Prime Minister Sheikh Hasina
- Iraq – Prime Minister Mohammed Shia' Al Sudani
- Antigua and Barbuda – Prime Minister Gaston Browne
- Gabon – Prime Minister Raymond Ndong Sima

==== Evening session ====
- Solomon Islands – Prime Minister Manasseh Sogavare
- Vietnam – Prime Minister Phạm Minh Chính
- Lesotho – Prime Minister Sam Matekane
- Cambodia – Prime Minister Hun Manet
- Georgia – Prime Minister Irakli Garibashvili
- Ireland – Taoiseach Leo Varadkar
- Grenada – Prime Minister Dickon Mitchell
- Tuvalu – Prime Minister Kausea Natano
- Haiti – Acting Prime Minister Ariel Henry
- Tonga – Prime Minister Siaosi Sovaleni
- United Kingdom – Deputy Prime Minister Oliver Dowden
- Singapore – Foreign Minister Vivian Balakrishnan
- Australia – Foreign Minister Penny Wong
- Bahrain – Foreign Minister Abdullatif bin Rashid Al Zayani
- Bahamas – Foreign Minister Fred Mitchell
- Sweden – Foreign Minister Tobias Billström
- Costa Rica – Foreign Minister Arnoldo André Tinoco

=== 23 September ===
==== Morning session ====
- Saint Vincent and the Grenadines – Prime Minister Ralph Gonsalves
- Samoa – Prime Minister Fiamē Naomi Mataʻafa
- Saint Kitts and Nevis – Prime Minister Terrance Drew
- Cape Verde – Prime Minister Ulisses Correia e Silva
- Somalia – Prime Minister Hamza Abdi Barre
- Laos – Deputy Prime Minister Saleumxay Kommasith
- Ethiopia – Deputy Prime Minister Demeke Mekonnen
- Papua New Guinea – Deputy Prime Minister John Rosso
- Azerbaijan – Foreign Minister Jeyhun Bayramov
- Russia – Foreign Minister Sergey Lavrov
- Indonesia – Foreign Minister Retno Marsudi
- Mexico – Foreign Minister Alicia Bárcena Ibarra
- Philippines – Foreign Minister Enrique Manalo
- New Zealand – Foreign Minister Nanaia Mahuta
- Tunisia – Foreign Minister Nabil Ammar
- Iceland – Foreign Minister Þórdís Gylfadóttir
- Egypt – Foreign Minister Sameh Shoukry

==== Evening session ====
- Saudi Arabia – Foreign Minister Faisal bin Farhan Al Saud
- Djibouti – Foreign Minister Mahamoud Ali Youssouf
- Belarus – Foreign Minister Sergei Aleinik
- Oman – Foreign Minister Badr bin Hamad Al Busaidi
- Belize – Foreign Minister Eamon Courtenay
- Eritrea – Foreign Minister Osman Saleh
- Armenia – Foreign Minister Ararat Mirzoyan
- Burkina Faso – Minister of State Bassolma Bazie
- Brunei – Second Foreign Minister Erywan Yusof
- Venezuela – Foreign Minister Yván Gil Pinto
- Norway – Minister of International Development Anne Beathe Tvinnereim
- Mali – Foreign Minister Abdoulaye Diop
- United Arab Emirates – Minister of International Cooperation Reem Al Hashimy

=== 26 September ===
==== Morning session ====
- India – Foreign Minister Subrahmanyam Jaishankar
- Jamaica – Foreign Minister Kamina Johnson Smith
- Bhutan – Foreign Minister Tandi Dorji
- Cameroon – Foreign Minister Lejeune Mbella Mbella
- Zambia – Foreign Minister Stanley Kakubo
- Holy See – State Relations Secretary Paul Gallagher
- Syria – Deputy Foreign Minister Bassam al-Sabbah
- Maldives – Minister of State for Foreign Affairs Ahmed Khaleel
- Nicaragua – Foreign Minister Denis Moncada Colindres
- North Korea – Delegation Chair Kim Song
- Benin – Delegation Chair Marc Hermanne Gninadoou
- San Marino – Delegation Chair Damiano Beleffi
- Canada – Delegation Chair Bob Rae
- Vanuatu – Delegation Chair Odo Tevi
- Morocco – Delegation Chair Omar Hilale
- United Nations – 78th Session of the United Nations General Assembly - President Dennis Francis (Closing statement)
- No representatives for Afghanistan, Madagascar, Myanmar, and Niger were on the agenda of the general debate.

== See also ==
- List of UN General Assembly sessions
- List of General debates of the United Nations General Assembly
