= General debate of the seventy-seventh session of the United Nations General Assembly =

2022 political event in New York City

- 20 – 26 September 2022 77th session 77th general debate

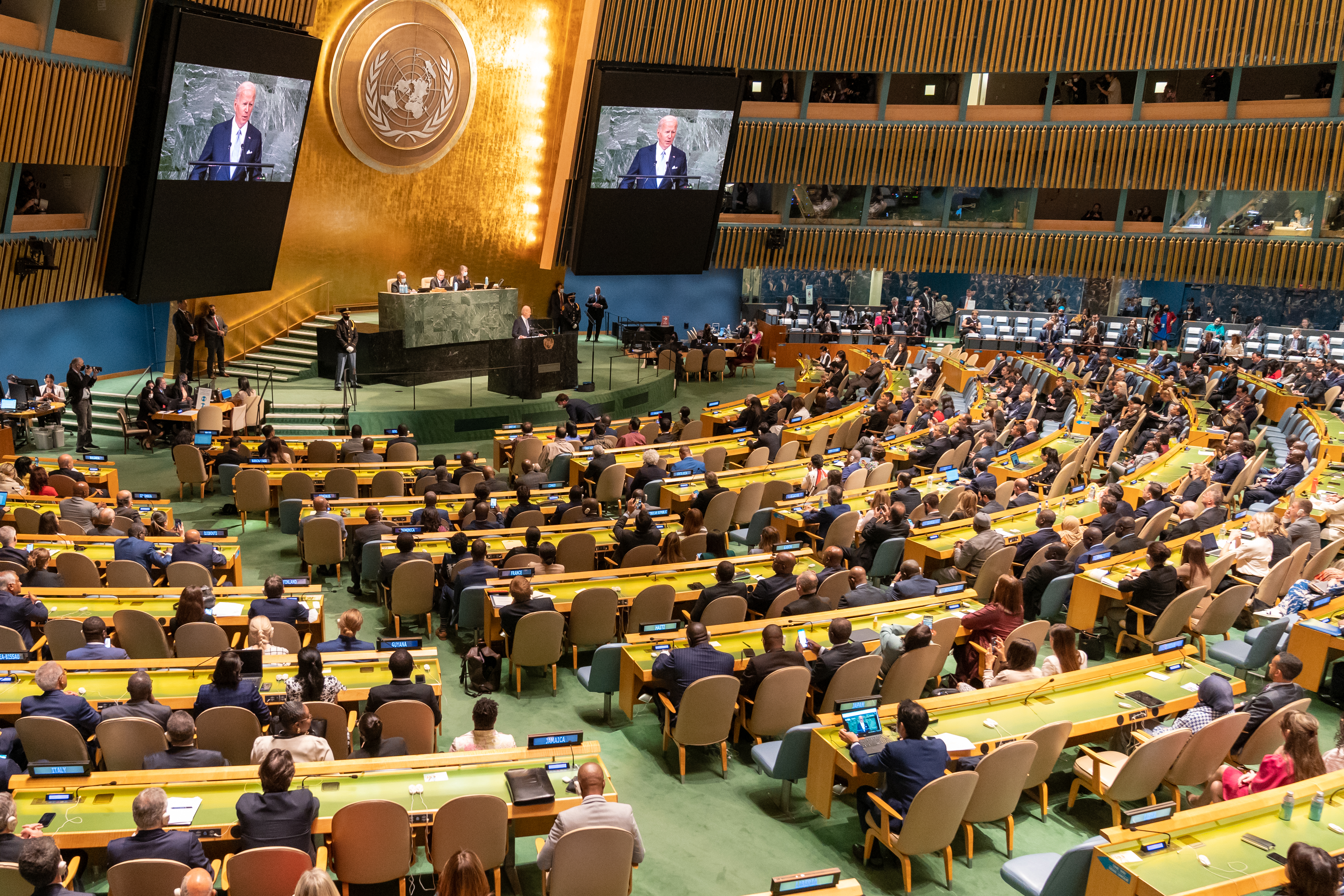
- US President Joe Biden speaks in the General Assembly Hall
- Host country: United Nations
- Cities: New York City, United States
- Venues: General Assembly Hall at the United Nations Headquarters
- Participants: United Nations Member States
- President: Csaba Kőrösi
- Secretary-General: António Guterres

The General debate of the 77th session of the United Nations General Assembly (UNGA) opened on 20 September and ran until 26 September 2022. Leaders from a number of member states addressed the UNGA.

== Organisation and subjects ==
The order of speakers is given first to member states, then observer states and supranational bodies. Any other observer entities will have a chance to speak at the end of the debate, if they so choose. Speakers will be put on the list in the order of their request, with special consideration for ministers and other government officials of similar or higher rank. According to the rules in place for the General Debate, the statements should be in one of the United Nations official languages (Arabic, Chinese, English, French, Russian or Spanish) and will be translated and interpreted by United Nations translators and interpreters. Each speaker is requested to provide 20 advance copies of their statements to the conference officers to facilitate translation and to be presented at the podium. The theme for this year's debate was chosen by President Csaba Kőrösi as: "Solutions through Solidarity, Sustainability and Science".

== Speaking schedule ==
Since 1955, Brazil and the United States are the first and second countries to speak. However, U.S. President Joe Biden was scheduled to speak on 21 September, a day later than usual. Other countries follow according to a speaking schedule issued by the Secretariat.

The list of speakers is provided by both the daily UN Journal, while changes in order are also reflected by the UNGA General Debate website.

=== 20 September ===
==== Morning session ====
- United Nations – Secretary-General António Guterres (Report of the UN Secretary-General)
- United Nations – 77th Session of the United Nations General Assembly - President Csaba Kőrösi (Opening statement)
- Brazil – President Jair Bolsonaro
- Senegal – President Macky Sall
- Chile – President Gabriel Boric (Note: First speech to the UNGA General Debate.)
- Jordan – King Abdullah II
- Colombia – President Gustavo Petro
- Turkey – President Recep Tayyip Erdoğan
- Kyrgyzstan – President Sadyr Japarov
- Kazakhstan – President Kassym-Jomart Tokayev
- Qatar – Emir Tamim bin Hamad Al Thani
- South Korea – President Yoon Suk-yeol
- Paraguay – President Mario Abdo Benítez
- Finland – President Sauli Niinistö
- Switzerland – President Ignazio Cassis
- Slovakia – President Zuzana Čaputová
- France – President Emmanuel Macron

==== Evening session ====
- Honduras – President Xiomara Castro
- Philippines – President Bongbong Marcos
- Lithuania – President Gitanas Nausėda
- Romania – President Klaus Iohannis
- Bolivia – President Luis Arce
- Peru – President Pedro Castillo
- Marshall Islands – President David Kabua
- Seychelles – President Wavel Ramkalawan
- Argentina – President Alberto Fernández
- Poland – President Andrzej Duda
- Guatemala – President Alejandro Giammattei
- Democratic Republic of Congo – President Félix Tshisekedi
- Central African Republic – President Faustin-Archange Touadéra
- El Salvador – President Nayib Bukele
- Japan – Prime Minister Fumio Kishida
- Germany – Chancellor Olaf Scholz
- Morocco – Prime Minister Aziz Akhannouch
- Italy – Prime Minister Mario Draghi

=== 21 September ===
==== Morning session ====
- Nigeria – President Muhammadu Buhari
- Iran – President Ebrahim Raisi
- Mongolia – President Ukhnaagiin Khürelsükh
- Rwanda – President Paul Kagame
- Bosnia and Herzegovina – Chair of the Presidency Šefik Džaferović
- Suriname – President Chan Santokhi
- United States – President Joe Biden
- Latvia – President Egils Levits
- Ecuador – President Guillermo Lasso
- Zambia – President Hakainde Hichilema
- Madagascar – President Andry Rajoelina
- Libya – Chairman of the Presidential Council Mohamed al-Menfi
- Moldova – President Maia Sandu
- Namibia – President Hage Geingob
- Slovenia – President Borut Pahor
- Kenya – President William Ruto
- Gabon – President Ali Bongo Ondimba
- Guyana – President Irfaan Ali

==== Evening session ====
- Hungary – President Katalin Novák
- Ivory Coast – President Alassane Ouattara
- Sierra Leone – President Julius Maada Bio
- Estonia – President Alar Karis
- Ghana – President Nana Akufo-Addo
- Cape Verde – President José Maria Neves
- Eswatini – King Mswati III
- Ukraine – President Volodymyr Zelenskyy
- Serbia – President Aleksandar Vučić
- Monaco – Prince Albert II
- Dominica – President Charles Savarin
- Lebanon – President Michel Aoun
- Czech Republic – Minister of International Relations Jan Lipavský
- Cuba – Minister of Foreign Affairs Bruno Rodríguez Parrilla
- South Africa – Minister of International Relations and Cooporation Naledi Pandor
- Dominican Republic – Minister of Foreign Affairs Roberto Álvarez
- Costa Rica – Minister of Foreign Affairs Arnoldo André Tinoco
- Palau – Minister of Foreign Affairs Gustav Aitaro
- United Kingdom – Prime Minister Liz Truss

=== 22 September ===
==== Morning session ====
- Botswana – President Mokgweetsi Masisi
- Niger – President Mohamed Bazoum
- Gambia – President Adama Barrow
- Yemen – Chairman of the Presidential Leadership Council Rashad al-Alimi
- Kiribati – President Taneti Maamau
- Zimbabwe – President Emmerson Mnangagwa
- Guinea-Bissau – President Umaro Sissoco Embaló
- Comoros – President Azali Assoumani
- Liberia – President George Weah
- Somalia – President Hassan Sheikh Mohamud
- Burundi – President Évariste Ndayishimiye
- Sudan – President Abdel Fattah al-Burhan
- Israel – Prime Minister Yair Lapid
- Papua New Guinea – Prime Minister James Marape
- Georgia – Prime Minister Irakli Garibashvili
- Norway – Prime Minister Jonas Gahr Støre
- Barbados – Prime Minister Mia Mottley

==== Evening session ====
- Malawi – President Lazarus Chakwera
- Federated States of Micronesia – President David Panuelo
- South Sudan – Vice President Riek Machar
- Tanzania – Vice President Philip Mpango
- Uganda – Vice President Jessica Alupo
- Panama – Vice President Jose Gabriel Carrizo
- Portugal – Prime Minister António Costa
- Armenia – Prime Minister Nikol Pashinyan
- Ireland – Taoiseach Micheál Martin
- Malta – Prime Minister Robert Abela
- Kuwait – Prime Minister Sheikh Ahmad Nawaf Al-Ahmad Al-Sabah
- Spain – Prime Minister Pedro Sánchez
- Jamaica – Prime Minister Andrew Holness
- Austria – Minister of International Affairs Alexander Schallenberg
- Mexico – Minister of Foreign Affairs Marcelo Ebrard
- Bahrain – Minister of Foreign Affairs Abdullatif bin Rashid Al Zayani
- Denmark – Minister of Foreign Affairs Jeppe Kofod

=== 23 September ===
==== Morning session ====
- East Timor – President José Ramos-Horta
- Burkina Faso – President Paul-Henri Sandaogo Damiba
- Cyprus – President Nicos Anastasiades
- Vanuatu – President Nikenike Vurobaravu
- State of Palestine – President Mahmoud Abbas
- European Union – President of the European Council Charles Michel
- Fiji – Prime Minister Frank Bainimarama
- Luxembourg – Prime Minister Xavier Bettel
- Netherlands – Prime Minister Mark Rutte
- Solomon Islands – Prime Minister Manasseh Sogavare
- New Zealand – Prime Minister Jacinda Ardern
- Pakistan – Prime Minister Shehbaz Sharif
- Cambodia – Prime Minister Hun Sen
- Saint Lucia – Prime Minister Philip J. Pierre
- Belgium – Prime Minister Alexander De Croo
- Andorra – Prime Minister Xavier Espot Zamora
- Mauritius – Prime Minister Pravind Jugnauth
- Tonga – Prime Minister Siaosi Sovaleni
- Greece – Prime Minister Kyriakos Mitsotakis

==== Evening session ====
- Antigua and Barbuda – Prime Minister Gaston Browne
- Iraq – Prime Minister Mustafa Al-Kadhimi
- Malaysia – Prime Minister Ismail Sabri Yaakob
- Bangladesh – Prime Minister Sheikh Hasina
- Croatia – Prime Minister Andrej Plenković
- Samoa – Prime Minister Fiamē Naomi Mataʻafa
- Montenegro – Prime Minister Dritan Abazović
- Saint Kitts and Nevis – Prime Minister Terrance Drew
- Belize – Prime Minister Johnny Briceño
- Tuvalu – Prime Minister Kausea Natano
- Maldives – Minister of Foreign Affairs Abdulla Shahid
- Australia – Minister of Foreign Affairs Penny Wong
- Equatorial Guinea – Minister of Foreign Affairs Simeón Oyono Esono
- Liechtenstein – Minister of Foreign Affairs Dominique Hasler
- Togo – Minister of Foreign Affairs Robert Dussey
- Chad – Minister of Foreign Affairs Awatif Al-Tidjani Ahmed

=== 24 September ===
==== Morning session ====
- Bahamas – Prime Minister Philip Davis
- Mali – Acting Prime Minister Abdoulaye Maïga
- Saint Vincent and the Grenadines – Prime Minister Ralph Gonsalves
- Grenada – Prime Minister Dickon Mitchell
- North Macedonia – Prime Minister Dimitar Kovačevski
- Lesotho – Prime Minister Moeketsi Majoro
- Mozambique – Prime Minister Adriano Maleiane
- Albania – Prime Minister Edi Rama
- Holy See – Secretary of State Pietro Parolin
- China – State Councilor and Minister of Foreign Affairs Wang Yi
- Vietnam – Deputy Prime Minister Phạm Bình Minh
- Laos – Deputy Prime Minister Saleumxay Kommasith
- Thailand – Deputy Prime Minister Don Pramudwinai
- Ethiopia – Deputy Prime Minister Demeke Mekonnen
- Russia – Minister of Foreign Affairs Sergey Lavrov
- Tajikistan – Minister of Foreign Affairs Sirojiddin Muhriddin
- India – Minister of External Affairs Subrahmanyam Jaishankar
- Sweden – Minister of Foreign Affairs Ann Linde
- Bulgaria – Caretaker Minister of Foreign Affairs Nikolay Milkov
- Egypt – Minister of Foreign Affairs Sameh Shoukry

==== Evening session ====
- Azerbaijan – Minister of Foreign Affairs Jeyhun Bayramov
- Singapore – Minister of Foreign Affairs Vivian Balakrishnan
- Belarus – Minister of Foreign Affairs Vladimir Makei
- San Marino – Minister of Foreign Affairs Luca Beccari
- Saudi Arabia – Minister of Foreign Affairs Prince Faisal bin Farhan Al Saud
- Brunei – Minister of Foreign Affairs Erywan Yusof
- Sri Lanka – Minister of Foreign Affairs Ali Sabry
- Venezuela – Minister of Foreign Affairs Carlos Faria
- Uzbekistan – Minister of Foreign Affairs Vladimir Norov
- Trinidad and Tobago – Minister of Foreign Affairs Amery Browne
- Iceland – Minister of Foreign Affairs Þórdís Kolbrún R. Gylfadóttir
- Haiti – Minister of Foreign Affairs Jean Victor Geneus
- Guinea – Prime Minister Bernard Goumou
- United Arab Emirates – Minister of State Reem Al Hashimi

=== 26 September ===
==== Morning session ====
- Syria – Minister of Foreign Affairs Faisal Mekdad
- Republic of Congo – Minister of Foreign Affairs Jean-Claude Gakosso
- Eritrea – Minister of Foreign Affairs Osman Saleh Mohammed
- Uruguay – Minister of Foreign Affairs Francisco Bustillo
- Mauritania – Minister of Foreign Affairs Ismail Ould Cheikh Ahmed
- Indonesia – Minister of Foreign Affairs Retno Marsudi
- Algeria – Minister of Foreign Affairs Ramtane Lamamra
- Nicaragua – Minister of Foreign Affairs Denis Moncada
- Tunisia – Minister of Foreign Affairs Othman Jerandi
- Bhutan – Minister of Foreign Affairs Tandi Dorji
- Canada – Minister of Foreign Affairs Mélanie Joly
- Cameroon – Minister of Foreign Affairs Lejeune Mbella Mbella
- Nepal – Foreign Secretary Narayan Khadka
- Benin – Permanent Representative Marc Gninadoou Araba
- North Korea – Permanent Representative Kim Song
- Turkmenistan – Permanent Representative Aksoltan Ataýewa
- Angola – Permanent Representative Maria de Jesus dos Reis Ferreira
- Oman – Permanent Representative Mohammed Al Hassan
- Djibouti – Permanent Representative Mohamed Siad Doualeh
- Nauru – Permanent Representative Josie Ann Dongobir
- United Nations – 77th Session of the United Nations General Assembly - President Csaba Kőrösi (Closing statement)
- No representatives for Afghanistan, Myanmar, and São Tomé and Príncipe were on the agenda of the general debate.

== See also ==
- List of UN General Assembly sessions
- List of General debates of the United Nations General Assembly
