= United Nations General Assembly Resolution 78/213 =

2023 resolution regarding human rights

UN General Assembly Resolution 78/213
- Date: December 22 2023
- Meeting no.: 82nd Plenary
- Code: A/RES/78/213 (Document)
- Subject: Promotion and protection of human rights in the context of digital technologies
- Result: Adopted

United Nations General Assembly Resolution 78/213 is a resolution adopted by the seventy-eighth session of the United Nations General Assembly on December 22, 2023, regarding the promotion and protection of human rights in the context of digital technologies.

== Draft ==
The Resolution 78/213 also known as draft resolution A/C.3/78/L.49/Rev.1.

The draft was initially presented to the Social, Humanitarian and Cultural Committee (Third Committee) of the United Nations General Assembly at its 52nd meeting on 14 November 2023, by Argentina, Armenia, Austria, Belgium, Bulgaria, Cyprus, Czechia, Denmark, Estonia, Fiji, Finland, Italy, Latvia, Lithuania, Luxembourg, Maldives, Mexico, the Kingdom of the Netherlands, North Macedonia, Poland, the Republic of Moldova, Romania, Slovenia and South Africa.

Subsequently, Albania, Andorra, Australia, Belize, Bosnia and Herzegovina, Brazil, Cape Verde, Canada, Chile, Colombia, Costa Rica, Croatia, the Dominican Republic, Ecuador, El Salvador, France, Georgia, Germany, Greece, Guatemala, Honduras, Hungary, Iceland, Ireland, Jordan, Lebanon, Lesotho, Liechtenstein, Malawi, Malta, Monaco, Montenegro, Namibia, Nepal, Paraguay, Portugal, the Republic of Korea, Rwanda, San Marino, Serbia, Slovakia, Spain, Sweden, Switzerland, Tunisia, Ukraine, the United States of America, Uruguay and Zambia joined in sponsoring the draft resolution.

Statements were made by the representatives of Czechia (on behalf of the Maldives, Mexico, the Kingdom of the Netherlands and South Africa), Uruguay, Denmark, Egypt, Mexico, the United Kingdom of Great Britain and Northern Ireland, the United States of America, Singapore, Austria, Indonesia, Jamaica, the Islamic Republic of Iran, Israel, and the observer for the Holy See.

== Voting ==
At its 52nd meeting, the Committee adopted draft resolution A/C.3/78/L.49/Rev.1
