= Seventy-seventh session of the United Nations General Assembly =

Session of UNGA which runs from 2022 to 2023

- 13 September 2022 – 5 September 2023 77th session 77th general debate
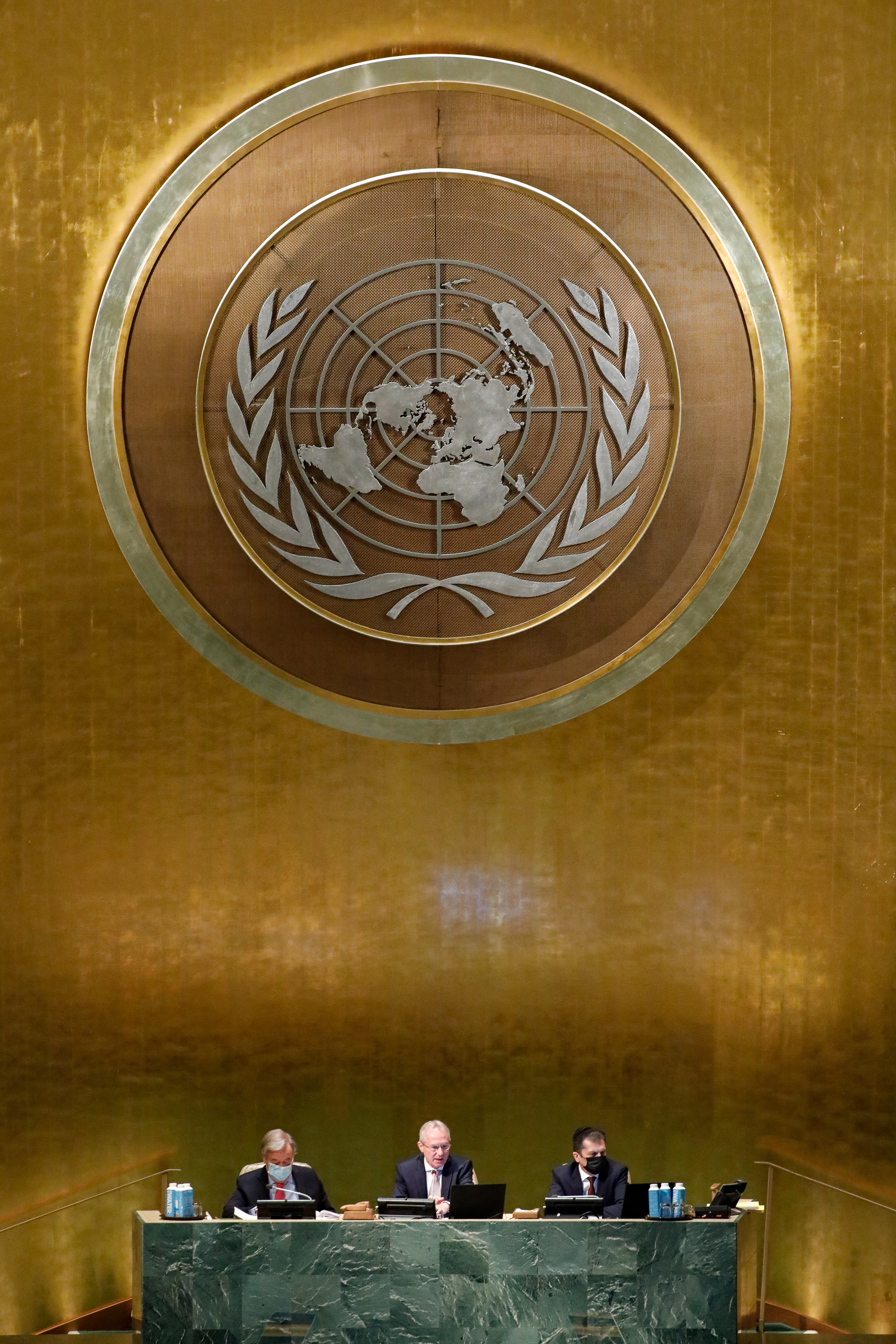
- Host country: United Nations
- Cities: New York City, United States
- Venues: General Assembly Hall at the United Nations Headquarters
- Participants: United Nations Member States
- President: (Hungary) Csaba Kőrösi
- Secretary-General: António Guterres
- Website: www.un.org/en/ga/

The Seventy-seventh session of the United Nations General Assembly was the session of the United Nations General Assembly which opened on 13 September 2022, and closed on 5 September 2023. The President of the UN General Assembly was from Eastern European Group.

== Organisation for the session ==
=== President ===
On 7 June 2022, Hungarian diplomat and Director of Environmental Sustainability in the Office of the President of Hungary, Csaba Kőrösi was elected to the position of President of the General Assembly.

In his statement, Kőrösi highlighted the United Nations role on the Russian invasion of Ukraine and other armed conflicts and stay firm on the UN principles of the UN Charter.

=== Vice Presidents ===
The General Assembly elected the following countries as the vice-presidents of the 77th session:

The five permanent members of the United Nations Security Council:

- China
- France
- Russia
- United Kingdom
- United States of America

As well as the following nations:

- Australia
- Benin
- Burundi
- Chile
- El Salvador
- Israel
- Jamaica
- Kenya
- Malaysia
- Mauritania
- Nepal
- Niger
- Tajikistan
- Turkmenistan
- Vietnam
- Zimbabwe

=== General debate ===
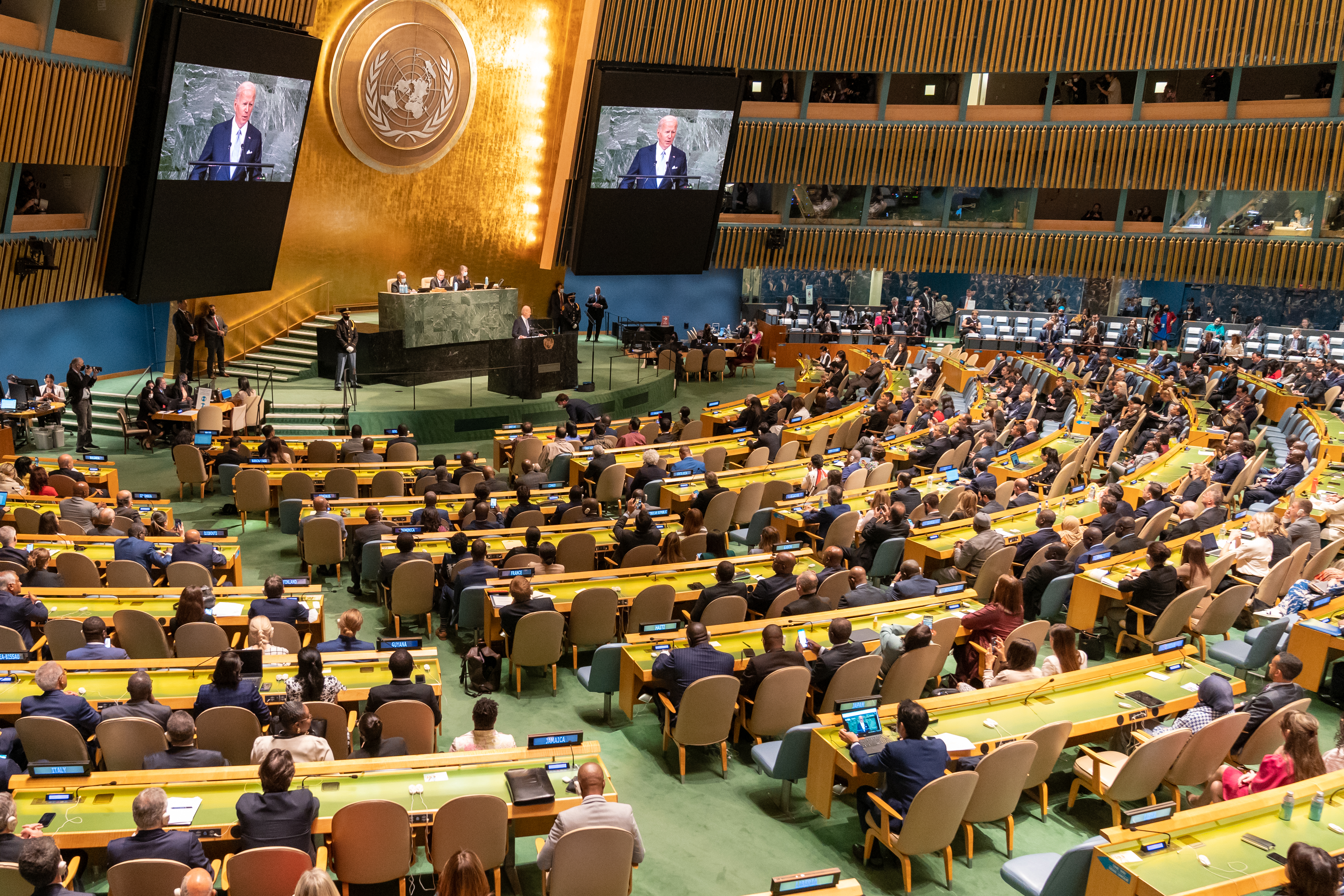
US President Joe Biden addresses the General Assembly

Each member of the General Assembly had a representative speaking about issues concerning their country and the hopes for the coming year as to what the UNGA would do. This is an opportunity for the member states to opine on international issues of their concern.

The order of speakers is given first to member states, then observer states and supranational bodies. Any other observers entities will have a chance to speak at the end of the debate, if they so choose. Speakers will be put on the list in the order of their request, with special consideration for ministers and other government officials of similar or higher rank. According to the rules in place for the General Debate, the statements should be in of the United Nations official languages of Arabic, Chinese, English, French, Russian or Spanish, and will be translated by the United Nations translators. Each speaker is requested to provide 20 advance copies of their statements to the conference officers to facilitate translation and to be presented at the podium.

== See also ==
- List of UN General Assembly sessions
- List of General debates of the United Nations General Assembly
