= Cabinet of Kyélem de Tambèla =

Government of Burkina Faso

== Members of the Cabinet of Kyélem de Tambèla ==
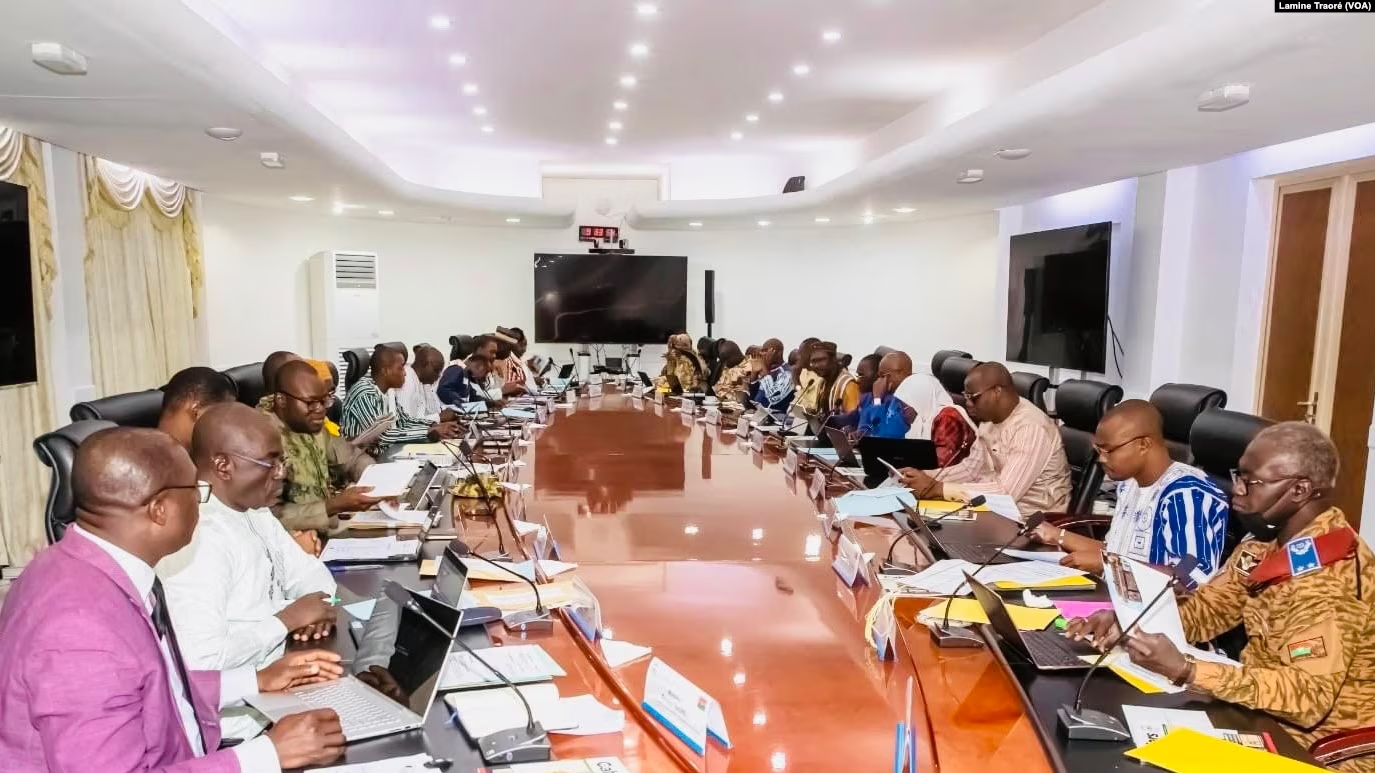

Apollinaire Joachim Kyélem de Tambèla was appointed interim prime minister by interim president Ibrahim Traoré on October 21, 2022.

Post	Deputy minister	Term
Prime Minister of Burkina Faso	Apollinaire Joachim Kyélem de Tambèla	October 21, 2022 – December 6, 2024
Chief of Staff	Ferdinand Ouedraogo	October 21, 2022 – December 6, 2024
Minister of State	Kassoum Coulibaly	October 21, 2022 – December 6, 2024
Minister of Defense and Veterans Affairs	Kassoum Coulibaly	October 21, 2022 – December 6, 2024
Minister of Civil Service, Labor, and Social Protection	Bassolma Bazie	October 21, 2022 – December 6, 2024
Minister of Foreign Affairs, Regional Cooperation and Burkinabè Abroad	Olivia Rouamba	October 21, 2022 – December 6, 2024
Minister of Economy, Finance and Foresight	Aboubacar Nacanabo	October 21, 2022 – December 6, 2024
Ministry of Justice	Bibata Nébie	October 21, 2022 – 27 June 2023
Minister of Justice	Edasso Rodrigue Bayala	27 June 2023 – December 6, 2024
Minister of Agriculture, Animal and Fisheries Resources	Denis Ouedraogo	October 21, 2022 – 25 June 2023
Minister of Digital Transition, Posts, and Electronic Communications	Aminata Zerbo-Sabané	October 21, 2022 – December 6, 2024
Ministry for the Promotion of Women and National Solidarity	Nandy Somé-Diallo	October 21, 2022 – December 6, 2024
Minister of Industrial Development, Trade, Crafts and Small and Medium Enterprises	Donatien Nagalo	October 21, 2022 – December 6, 2024
Minister of Infrastructure and Opening Up	Adama Luc Sorgho	October 21, 2022 – December 6, 2024
Minister of Energy, Mines and Quarries	Simon Pierre Boussim	October 21, 2022 – December 6, 2024
Minister of National Education, Literacy and Promotion of National Languages	Joseph André Ouedraogo	October 21, 2022 – December 6, 2024
Minister of Higher Education, Research and Innovation	Adjima Thiombiano	October 21, 2022 – December 6, 2024
Minister of Environment, Energy, Water and Sanitation	Augustin Kabore	October 21, 2022 – December 6, 2024
Minister of Urban Planning, Land Affairs and Housing	Yacouba Die	October 21, 2022 – December 6, 2024
Minister of Sports, Youth and Employment	Issouf Sirima	October 21, 2022 – December 6, 2024
Minister of Communication, Culture, Arts and Tourism	Rimtalba Jean Emmanuel Ouedraogo	October 21, 2022 – December 6, 2024
Minister of Transport, Urban Mobility and Road Safety	Anuuyirtole Roland Somda	October 21, 2022 – December 6, 2024
Minister Delegate to the Minister of Territorial Administration, Decentralization and Security Responsible for Security	Mahamoudou Sana	October 21, 2022 – December 6, 2024
Minister Delegate to the Minister of Foreign Affairs, Regional Cooperation and Burkinabé Abroad, responsible for Regional Cooperation	Karamoko Jean-Marie Traoré	October 21, 2022 – December 6, 2024
Minister Delegate to the Minister of the Economy, Finance and Foresight, responsible for the Budget	Fatoumata Bako/Traore	October 21, 2022 – December 6, 2024
Director of Communication and Public Relations	Atéridar Galip Some	October 21, 2022 – December 6, 2024
Director of Protocol	Abdoulaye Tiendrebeogo	October 21, 2022 – December 6, 2024
Aide-de-camp of the Prime Minister	Clement Kabre	October 21, 2022 – December 6, 2024
Chief of Security of the Prime Minister	Bob Landry Kabore	October 21, 2022 – December 6, 2024
Physician to the Prime Minister	Narcisse Oubda	October 21, 2022 – December 6, 2024
Minister of Territorial Administration, Decentralization and Security	Emile Zerbo	October 21, 2022 – December 6, 2024
Minister of Health and Public Hygiene	Robert Lucien Jean-Claude Kargougou	October 21, 2022 – December 6, 2024
Minister of Justice	Théophile Sawadogo	October 21, 2022 – December 6, 2024
