= Kenya–Kosovo relations =

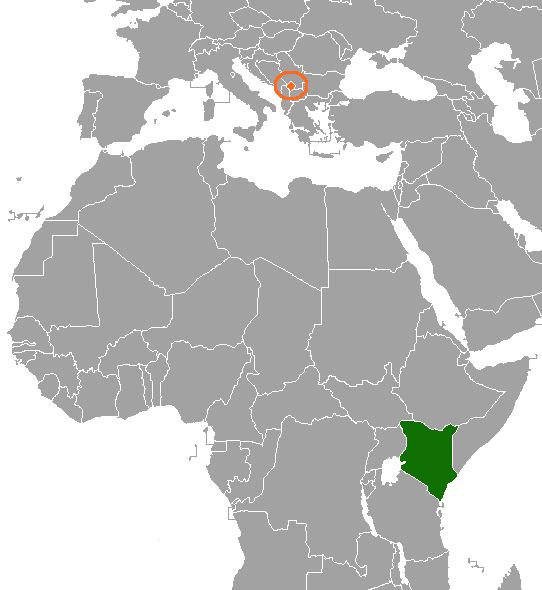
- Kenya: Kosovo

Kenya–Kosovo relations are foreign relations between Kenya and Kosovo. Kenya officially recognized Kosovo as an independent state in March 2025 and has accepted Kosovo passports as valid travel documents since March 2024.

== History ==
Kosovo declared its independence from Serbia on 17 February 2008.

At a meeting on 30 July 2008 between Kenyan and Serbian Foreign Ministers, Moses Wetangula and Vuk Jeremić, Wetangula reportedly spoke of Kenya's position regarding Kosovo and the territorial integrity of Serbia.

Following a September 2010 meeting with Kenyan politicians, Albanian prime minister Sali Berisha said that Kenya had promised to decide positively regarding recognition of Kosovo.

In October 2012, Kosovar sources reported that Kenyan Prime Minister of Kenya, Raila Odinga, stated that Kenya was seriously considering recognising Kosovo, and that a decision would be announced shortly.

In March 2023, following a trip by former President of Kosovo Behgjet Pacolli to Kenya, Pacolli shared an official document from Kenyan President William Ruto in which Ruto states that Kenya wishes to formalise cooperation with Kosovo and that Kenya recognises passports issued by Kosovo as valid travel documents.

In September 2023, during the UNGA 78th session, President William Ruto of Kenya and President Vjosa Osmani of Kosovo held a bilateral meeting. Kosovo's President thanked her Kenyan counterpart for recognizing Kosovo's passports and the parties discussed the possibilities of further deepening their cooperation. Kenyan foreign affairs minister Alfred Mutua confirmed his country's readiness to formally recognize Kosovo stating "117 countries have already recognized Kosovo as an independent state. We do not see any problem with recognizing Kosovo."

On 26 March 2025, Kenya officially recognized Kosovo as an independent and sovereign state.

== See also ==
- Foreign relations of Kenya
- Foreign relations of Kosovo
