= List of international presidential trips made by Ram Nath Kovind =

This is a list of international presidential trips made by Ram Nath Kovind, the 14th President of India. Kovind was elected as president and assumed the office for a five-year term on 25 July 2012 to succeed Pranab Mukherjee and served until 25 July 2017 and was succeeded by Droupadi Murmu.

== Summary of international trips ==
In his five-year tenure as the President, Ram Nath Kovind made 15 international trips, visiting 33 countries. The first state visit was to Djibouti between 3 and 4 October 2017, followed by Ethiopia. Jamaica was the final country to be visited by him during his presidency.

Map of international trips made by Ram Nath Kovind as President.

President Ram Nath Kovind's visits by country
| Number of visits | Country |
|---|---|
| 1 visit (33) | Australia, Bangladesh, Benin, Bolivia, Bulgaria, Chile, Croatia, Cuba, Cyprus, Czech Republic, Djibouti, Equatorial Guinea, Eswatini, Ethiopia, Gambia, Greece, Guinea, Iceland, Jamaica, Japan, Madagascar, Mauritius, Myanmar, Netherlands, Philippines, Slovenia, Saint Vincent and the Grenadines, Suriname, Switzerland, Tajikistan, Turkmenistan, Vietnam, Zambia |

== 2017 ==
| | Country | Date(s) | Details | Image |
|---|---|---|---|---|
| 1 | Djibouti | 3–4 October | | |
| 1 | Ethiopia | 5–6 October | | |

== 2018 ==
| | Country | Date(s) | Details | Image |
|---|---|---|---|---|
| 2 | Mauritius | 11–14 March | | |
| 2 | Madagascar | 14–15 March | Conferred on him the highest civilian honour of Madagascar, National Order of Madagascar. | |
| 3 | Equatorial Guinea | 7–9 April | Conferred on him the Order of Independence. | |
| 3 | Eswatini | 9–10 April | Conferred on him the highest civilian honour of Eswatini, Order of the Lion. | |
| 3 | Zambia | 10–12 April | | |
| 4 | Greece | 16–19 June | | |
| 4 | Suriname | 19–21 June | | |
| 4 | Cuba | 21–23 June | | |
| 5 | Cyprus | 2–4 September | | |
| 5 | Bulgaria | 4–6 September | | |
| 5 | Czech Republic | 6–9 September | | |
| 6 | Tajikistan | 7–9 October | | |
| 7 | Vietnam | 18–21 November | | |
| 7 | Australia | 21–24 November | The first state visit to Australia by an Indian president. | |
| 8 | Myanmar | 10–14 December | | |

== 2019 ==
| | Country | Date(s) | Details | Image |
|---|---|---|---|---|
| 9 | Croatia | 25–27 March | Conferred on him the highest civilian honour of Croatia, Grand Order of King Tomislav. | |
| 9 | Bolivia | 28–30 March | Conferred on him the highest civilian honour of Bolivia, Order of the Condor of the Andes. | |
| 9 | Chile | 30 March–1 April | | |
| 10 | Benin | 28–31 July | | |
| 10 | Gambia | 31 July–1 August | | |
| 10 | Guinea | 1–3 August | Conferred on him the highest civilian honor of Guinea, National Order of Merit. | |
| 11 | Iceland | 9–13 September | | |
| 11 | Switzerland | 13–16 September | | |
| 11 | Slovenia | 16–17 September | | |
| 12 | Philippines | 17–21 October | | |
| 12 | Japan | 21–23 October | | |

== 2020 ==
President Kovind did not make any international trips in 2020 due to the COVID-19 pandemic.

== 2021 ==
| | Country | Date(s) | Details | Image |
|---|---|---|---|---|
| 13 | Bangladesh | 15–17 December | | |

== 2022 ==
| | Country | Date(s) | Details | Image |
|---|---|---|---|---|
| 14 | Turkmenistan | 1–4 April | | |
| 14 | Netherlands | 4–7 April | | |
| 15 | Jamaica | 15–18 May | The first visit to Jamaica by an Indian president. | |
| 15 | Saint Vincent and the Grenadines | 18–21 May | The first visit to Saint Vincent and the Grenadines by an Indian president. | |

== See also ==
- Presidency of Ram Nath Kovind
- List of international prime ministerial trips made by Narendra Modi
- List of international trips made by S. Jaishankar as Minister of External Affairs of India
- History of Indian foreign relations
