= List of international presidential trips made by Droupadi Murmu =

This is a list of international presidential trips made by Droupadi Murmu since she became the President of India, following her election as president 25 July 2022.

== Summary of international trips ==
As of September 2026, Droupadi Murmu has made 9 international trips, visiting 17 countries. The first state visit was to United Kingdom between 17 and 20 September 2022, followed by Suriname and Serbia.

Map of international trips made by Droupadi Murmu as President (as of may 2026).

President Droupadi Murmu's visits by country
Number of visits	Country
1 visit (18)	Algeria, Angola, Botswana, Fiji, Malawi, Mauritania, Mauritius, Moldova, New Zealand, North Macedonia, Portugal, Romania, Serbia, Slovakia, Suriname, Timor-Leste, United Kingdom, Vatican City

== 2022 ==
	Country	Areas visited	Date(s)	Details	Images
1	United Kingdom	London	17–20 September	Attended state funeral of Queen Elizabeth II. First overseas visit. Held meetings with other world leaders.	

== 2023 ==
	Country	Areas visited	Date(s)	Details	Images
2	Suriname	Paramaribo	4–6 June	First state visit to Suriname. Participated in Indian diaspora events. Received Grand Order Chain of the Honorary Order of the Yellow Star.	
2	Serbia	Belgrade	7–9 June	First Indian presidential visit to Serbia. Bilateral meeting with President Aleksandar Vučić.	

== 2024 ==
	Country	Areas visited	Date(s)	Details	Images
3	Mauritius	Port Louis	11 March	State visit; Chief Guest at National Day; conferred honorary doctorate.	
4	Fiji	Suva	5–6 August	First-ever visit by an Indian head of state to Fiji. Accorded Companion of the Order of Fiji; addressed Fijian Parliament; held delegation-level talks with President; cultural and diaspora engagement.	
4	New Zealand	Auckland	7–9 August	Held bilateral meeting with Governor General Cindy Kiro and met Prime Minister Christopher Luxon; Address an education conference and interacted with the Indian community and friends of India.	
4	Timor-Leste	Dili	10 August	First Indian presidential visit; conferred Grand Collar of the Order of Timor-Leste; MoUs on health, digital tech.	
5	Algeria	Algiers	13–15 October	First-ever visit by an Indian President after 39 years. Awarded honorary doctorate; held Economic Forum and delegation-level.	
5	Mauritania	Nouakchott	16 October	First-ever presidential visit. Held bilateral talks with President; signed four MoUs on diplomatic training, cultural exchange, visa exemption and foreign office cooperation.	
5	Malawi	Lilongwe	17–19 October	Signed MoUs on health, youth, pharma; donated medical equipment; engaged with Indian community.	

== 2025 ==
	Country	Areas visited	Date(s)	Details	Images
6	Portugal	Lisbon	7–8 April	First state visit in 27 years. Received ceremonial guard of honour; awarded City Key of Honour by Mayor of Lisbon; meetings with President Marcelo Rebelo de Sousa and PM Luis Montenegro. Cultural and diaspora engagement.	
6	Slovakia	Bratislava	9–10 April	First visit by an Indian president to Slovakia in 29 years. Held bilateral talks with President Peter Pellegrini and Prime Minister Robert Fico. Received honorary doctorate. Two MoUs signed (on MSMEs and diplomatic training). Addressed Indian diaspora and attended cultural programs.	
7	Vatican City	Vatican City	25–26 April	Represented India at the state funeral of Pope Francis. Laid a wreath at St. Peter’s Basilica and attended the funeral Mass with world leaders.	
8	Angola	Luanda	8–11 November	First visit by an Indian president Angola, attended the 50th anniversary celebrations of Angola’s independence, addressed the National Assembly of Angola.	
8	Botswana	Gaborone	11–13 November	First visit by and Indian president to Botswana. Addressed the National Assembly of Botswana.	

== 2026 ==
	Country	Areas visited	Date(s)	Details	Images
9	Moldova	Chișinău	19–20 July	First visit by an Indian president to Moldova. Held bilateral talks with President Maia Sandu and President of the Parliament of Moldova Igor Grosu.	
9	North Macedonia	Skopje	21–22 July	First visit by an Indian president to North Macedonia. Held bilateral talks with President Gordana Siljanovska-Davkova, met the Prime Minister Hristijan Mickoski, President of the Assembly Afrim Gashi and also addressed the Assembly of North Macedonia.	
9	Romania	Bucharest	23–25 July	First visit by an Indian president to Romania in 32 years. Held bilateral talks President Nicușor Dan, interim Prime Minister Ilie Bolojan, President of the Senate Mircea Abrudean, and President of the Chamber of Deputies Sorin Grindeanu.	

== See also ==
- Presidency of Droupadi Murmu
- List of international prime ministerial trips made by Narendra Modi
- List of international trips made by S. Jaishankar as Minister of External Affairs of India
- History of Indian foreign relations
