= Quadrilateral group =

The Quadrilateral group or the Quad is an informal group which includes the trade spokespersons of Canada, the European Union, Japan, and the United States. It was first suggested at a private meeting during the 7th G7 summit in July 1981. Initially, a trilateral group was proposed (excluding Canada) because of the tensions between the two North American countries at that time but eventually, the Canadian Government successfully lobbied to be included. The European Commission has avoided formalizing the group because of resistance from the European Union members, particularly France, who resent their lack of direct involvement.

== List of Quadrilateral meetings ==
Location	Date(s)
Key Biscayne, Florida, United States	15–16 January 1982
Chateau d'Esclimont, France	12–13 May 1982
Tokyo, Japan	11 February 1983
Brussels, Belgium	29 April 1983
London, United Kingdom	16–17 July 1983
Ottawa, Ontario, Canada	26–27 September 1983
Islamorada, Florida, United States	2–4 February 1984
Erbach Im Reingau, Germany	28–30 June 1984
Kyoto, Japan	9–11 February 1985
Oba, Ontario, Canada	11–14 July 1985
San Diego, California, United States	16–19 January 1986
Sinta, Portugal	4–7 September 1986
Kashikojima, Japan	24–26 April 1987
Quadra Island, British Columbia, Canada	15–17 April 1988
Brainerd, Minnesota, United States	22–24 June 1988
The Hague, Netherlands	2–4 June 1989
Hakonemachi, Japan	12–14 November 1989
Napa, California, United States	2–4 May 1990
St. John's, Newfoundland and Labrador, Canada	11–13 October 1990
Angers, France	12–14 September 1991
Fukushima, Japan	24–26 April 1992
Cambridge, Ontario, Canada	16–18 October 1992
Toronto, Ontario, Canada	12–14 May 1993
Tokyo, Japan	23–24 June 1993
Los Angeles, California, United States	9–11 September 1994
Whistler, British Columbia, Canada	3–5 May 1995
Ripley Castle, Yorkshire, United Kingdom	20–21 October 1995
Kobe, Japan	19–21 April 1996
Seattle, Washington, United States	26–28 September 1996
Toronto, Ontario, Canada	30 April–2 May 1997
Versailles, France	29–30 April 1998
Tokyo, Japan	11–12 May 1999

== See also ==
- European Commissioner for Trade
- Group of Seven
- Minister of Economy, Trade and Industry (Japan)
- Minister of International Trade Diversification (Canada)
- Office of the United States Trade Representative
- Organisation for Economic Co-operation and Development (OECD)
