= Maria de Jesus dos Reis Ferreira =

Angolan diplomat

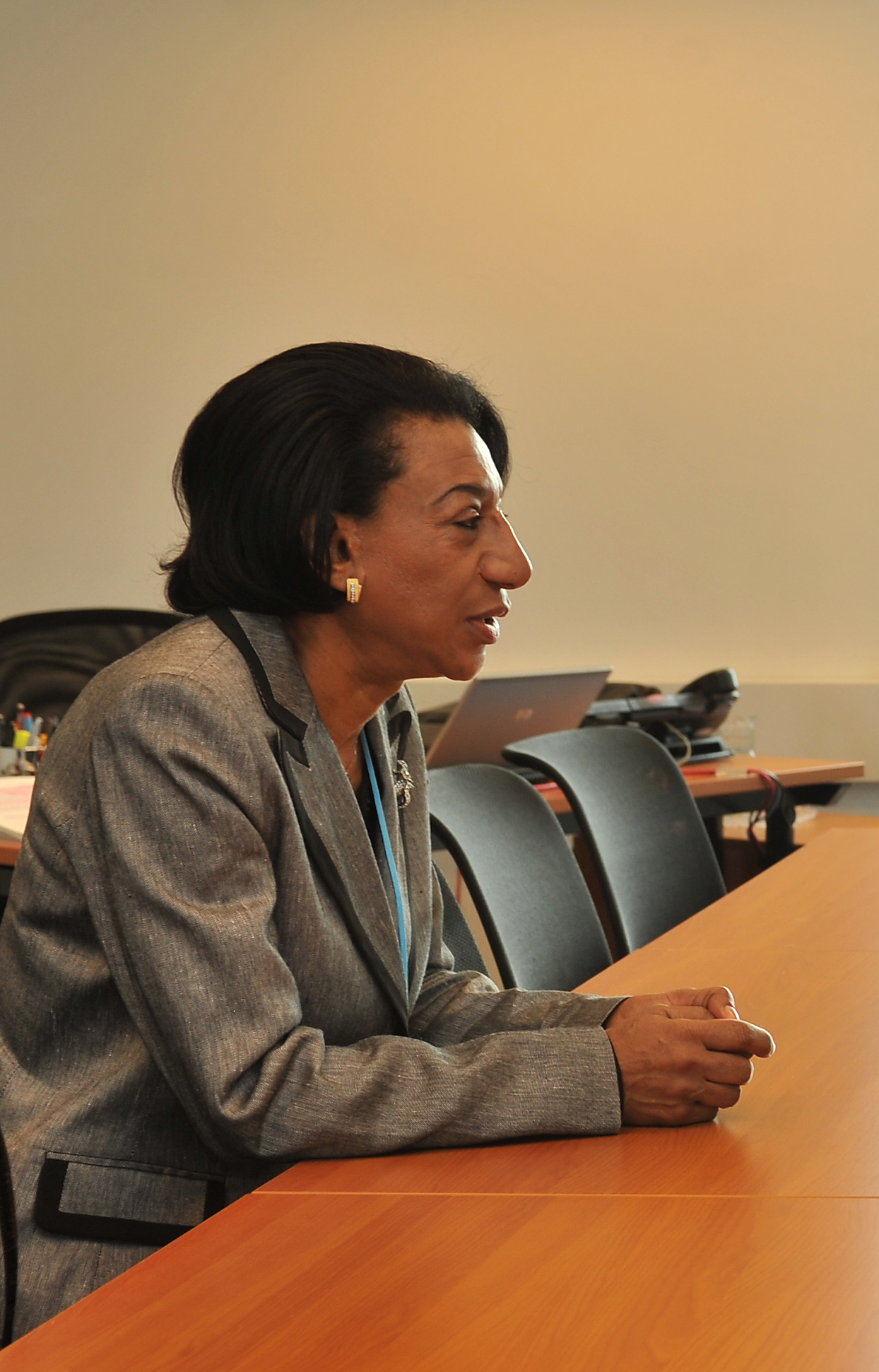
Ferreira in 2011

Maria de Jesus dos Reis Ferreira is the Ambassador Extraordinary and Plenipotentiary, and Permanent Representative of Angola to the United Nations (since May 22, 2018). She was also Ambassador Extraordinary and Plenipotentiary to Austria, Slovenia, Croatia and Slovakia, while serving as Permanent Representative of Angola to the Office of the United Nations in Vienna, the International Atomic Energy Agency (IAEA), the United Nations Industrial Development Organization (UNIDO) and the Comprehensive Nuclear‑Test‑Ban Treaty Organization.

A retired Army Brigadier of the Angolan Armed Forces, Ferreira earned a master’s degree in international law from the Catholic University of Portugal in Porto, Portugal, and a degree of licentiate in economics law from Universidade Lusófona of Humanities and Technologies in Lisbon, Portugal.
