= Dennis Francis (diplomat) =

President of the 78th UN General Assembly

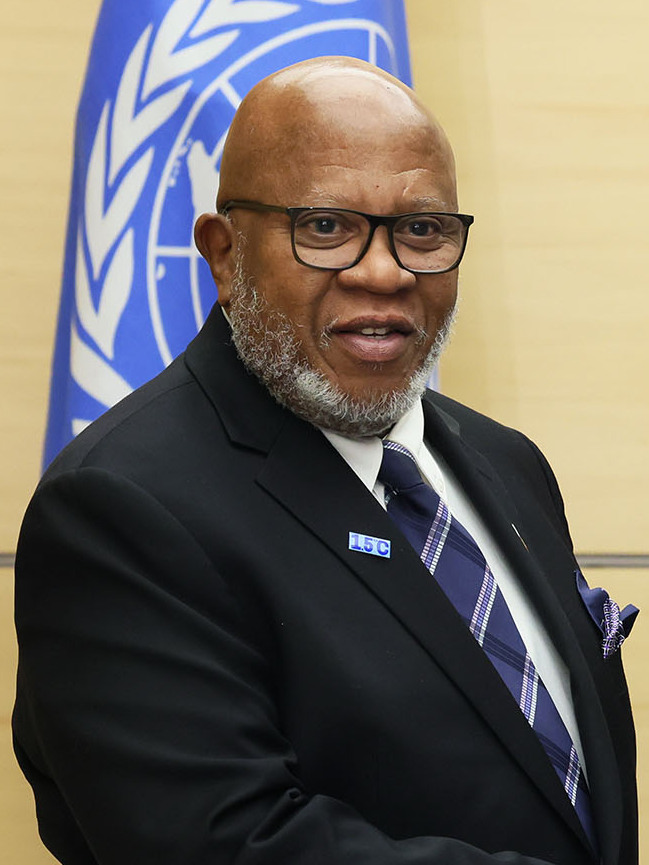
- Francis in 2024

President of the 78th UN General Assembly
- In office 5 September 2023 – 10 September 2024
- Preceded by: Csaba Kőrösi
- Succeeded by: Philémon Yang

Personal details
- Born: 27 November 1956 (age 69) Trinidad and Tobago
- Education: University of the West Indies, Johns Hopkins University
- Profession: Diplomat

Dennis Francis (born 27 November 1956) is a diplomat from Trinidad and Tobago who has served as his country's permanent representative to the United Nations in New York since 2021. From 2023 to 2024 he was President of the United Nations General Assembly at its seventy-eighth session.

== Education ==
Francis studied geography at the University of the West Indies in Mona, Jamaica, and international relations at the Paul H. Nitze School of Advanced International Studies at Johns Hopkins University in the United States.

== Career ==
Francis worked at the Trinidad and Tobago consulate in Toronto, Canada, from 1988 to 1996, including as Deputy Consul General, before becoming deputy director of International Economic and Trade Relations at the Trinidad and Tobago Ministry of Foreign Affairs in 1996 and Director of the European Affairs Division of the Ministry in 1997.

In 1999 he was appointed ambassador-designate to Cuba, the Dominican Republic and Haiti as well as high commissioner to Jamaica.

In 2000 he began a four-year term as his country's representative to the International Seabed Authority.

From 2004 to 2006 he served as ambassador to the Dominican Republic before being appointed as permanent representative of Trinidad and Tobago to the United Nations Office at Geneva. Between 2006 and 2011 he also represented his country at other international organisations in Geneva and Vienna, and was the non-resident ambassador to Austria and Italy.

From 2012 until his retirement in 2016, he led the Directorate for Multilateral Relations at the Trinidad and Tobago Ministry of Foreign Affairs.

In 2021, Francis came out of retirement and was appointed as permanent representative of Trinidad and Tobago to the United Nations in New York City. From 2023 to 2024 he served as President of the United Nations General Assembly at its seventy-eighth session. In remarks during a press conference on 10 September 2024, the last day of his General Assembly presidency, he cast doubt on whether the United Nations had sufficient means and authority to force Russia to comply with the UN Charter and international law.

Francis was awarded an honorary doctorate of education by the University of Buckingham in the United Kingdom in 2024.

== Family ==
Francis is married to Joy Thomas-Francis, with whom he has three sons and 3 grandchildren.

Diplomatic posts
Preceded by Csaba Kőrösi	President of the United Nations General Assembly; 2023–2024	Succeeded by Philémon Yang
