= Bassolma Bazie =

Burkinabe politician

Minister of Civil Service, Labor, and Social Protection of Burkina Faso
- In office 21 October 2022 – 8 December 2024
- President: Ibrahim Traoré (Interim )
- Succeeded by: Mathias Traoré

Personal details
- Born: Burkina Faso
- Party: People's Movement for Progress

Bassolma Bazie is a Burkinabe politician and educator. He served as Minister of Civil Service, Labor, and Social Protection in Burkina Faso from 2022 up until his replacement by Prime Minister Jean Emmanuel Ouédraogo in December 2024. Later that month, Bassolma Bazié was appointed President of the National Commission of the Confederation of Sahel States.

Awards and achievements
Preceded by	Minister of Civil Service, Labor, and Social Protection of Burkina Faso	Succeeded by
