= Seventy-eighth session of the United Nations General Assembly =

Session of UNGA which runs from 2023 to 2024

- 5 September 2023 – 10 September 2024 78th session 78th general debate
- Host country: United Nations
- Cities: New York City, United States
- Venues: General Assembly Hall at the United Nations Headquarters
- Participants: United Nations Member States
- President: Dennis Francis
- Secretary-General: António Guterres
- Website: www.un.org/en/ga/

The Seventy-eighth session of the United Nations General Assembly was a session of the United Nations General Assembly that convened from 5 September 2023 to 9 September 2024. The President of the General Assembly is from Latin American and Caribbean Group.

== Organisation for the session ==
=== President ===
On 1 June 2023, the Permanent Representative of Trinidad and Tobago to the United Nations, Dennis Francis, was elected to the position of President of the General Assembly.

=== Vice-Presidents ===
The General Assembly elected the following countries as the vice-presidents of the 78th session:

The five permanent members of the United Nations Security Council:

- China
- France
- Russia
- United Kingdom
- United States

As well as the following nations:

- Bolivia
- Congo
- Estonia
- Gambia
- Iceland
- Iran
- Malaysia
- Morocco
- Netherlands
- Senegal
- Singapore
- Sri Lanka
- Suriname
- Uganda
- Uzbekistan
- Zambia

=== General debate ===
Each member of the General Assembly had a representative speaking about issues concerning their country and the hopes for the coming year as to what the UNGA would do. This is an opportunity for the member states to opine on international issues of their concern.

The order of speakers is given first to member states, then observer states and supranational bodies. Any other observers entities will have a chance to speak at the end of the debate, if they so choose. Speakers will be put on the list in the order of their request, with special consideration for ministers and other government officials of similar or higher rank. According to the rules in place for the General Debate, the statements should be in of the United Nations official languages of Arabic, Chinese, English, French, Russian or Spanish, and will be translated by the United Nations translators. Each speaker is requested to provide 350 advance copies of their statements to the conference officers to facilitate translation and to be presented at the podium.

== See also ==
- List of UN General Assembly sessions
- List of General debates of the United Nations General Assembly
