= Csaba Kőrösi =

President of the 77th UN General Assembly

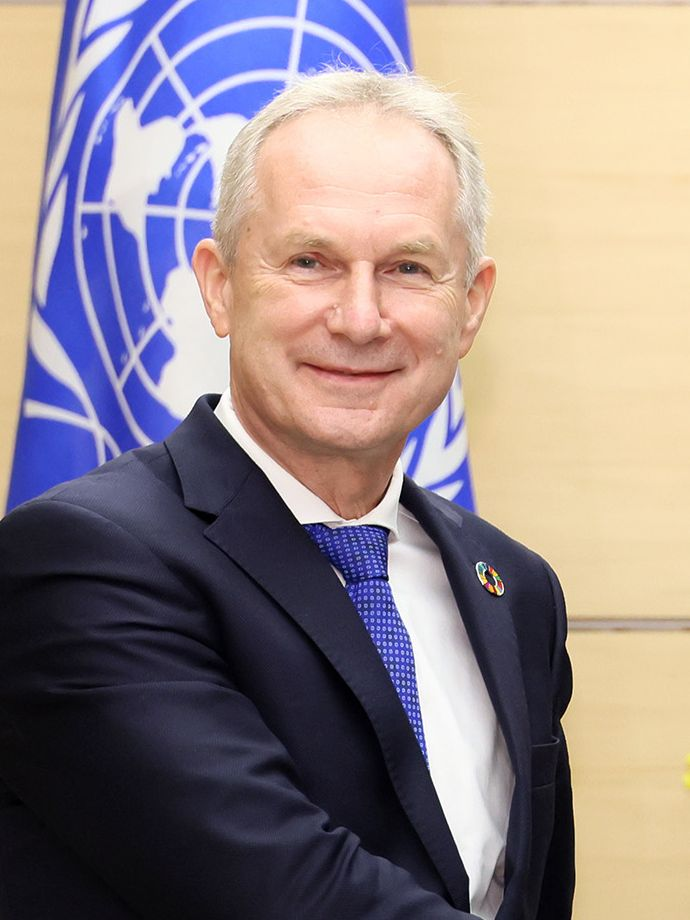
- Kőrösi in 2023

President of the 77th UN General Assembly
- In office 13 September 2022 – 5 September 2023
- Preceded by: Abdulla Shahid
- Succeeded by: Dennis Francis

Personal details
- Born: 1958 (age 67–68) Szeged, Hungarian People's Republic
- Education: Moscow State Institute of International Relations
- Profession: Diplomat

Csaba Kőrösi (Hungarian pronunciation: [tʃɒbɒ køːrøʃi]; born 1958) is a Hungarian diplomat who served as President of the 77th United Nations General Assembly. He was previously Director of Environmental Sustainability in the Office of the President of Hungary.

== Early life and education ==
Born in Szeged, Hungary, in 1958, Kőrösi studied at the Moscow Institute of International Relations (Russia), the University of Leeds Institute of International Relations (United Kingdom), the Truman Institute for Middle East Studies at the Hebrew University of Jerusalem, and Harvard Kennedy School at Harvard University (United States of America).

== Career ==
Kőrösi joined the Ministry of Foreign Affairs in 1983 and served in various countries, including Greece, Israel and Libya. He was also the Permanent Representative of Hungary to the United Nations and served as vice-president of the General Assembly from 2011 to 2012. He was Deputy State Secretary responsible for security policy, multilateral diplomacy and human rights before being appointed Director of Environmental Sustainability in the Office of the President of Hungary.

From 2022 to 2023 Kőrösi served as President of the United Nations General Assembly for its 77th session.

== Awards ==
Kőrösi is a recipient of the Hungarian Order of Merit. He was also awarded the Order of Merit of the Republic of Poland, the Sovereign Military Order of Malta and the Greek Order of the Phoenix.

Diplomatic posts
Preceded by Abdulla Shahid	President of the United Nations General Assembly; 2022–2023	Succeeded by Dennis Francis
