= United Nations Interpretation Service =

Team of interpreters at the UN

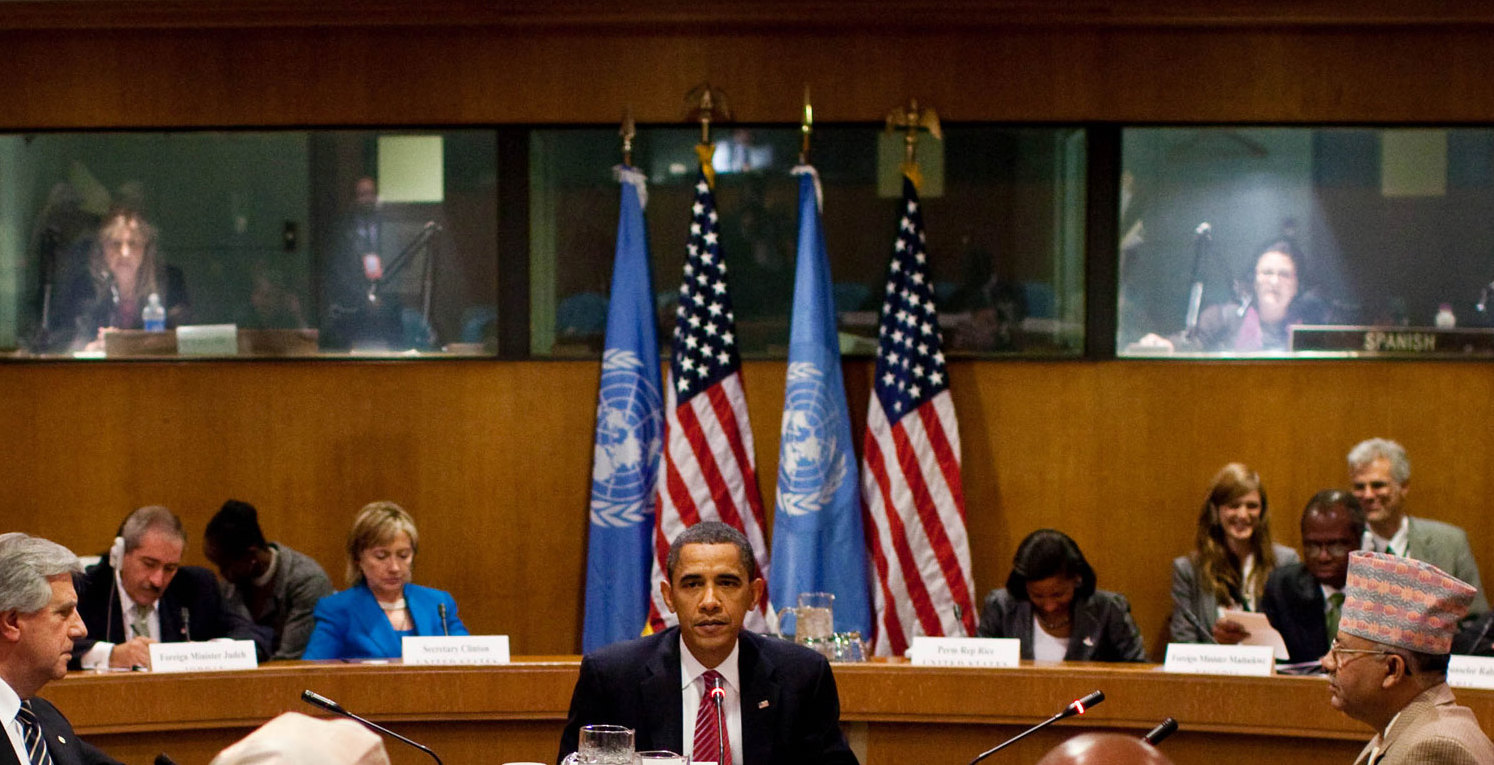
An interpreters' booth (top) at a 2009 UN meeting.

The United Nations Interpretation Service is a part of the Meetings and Publishing Division (MPD) of the UN's Department for General Assembly and Conference Management (DGACM). Its core function is to provide interpretation from and into Arabic, Chinese, English, French, Russian and Spanish for meetings held at the United Nations' headquarters, and those at other locations which the department is responsible for servicing. Interpretation is essential to the inter-governmental bodies for the proper conduct and smooth functioning of their deliberations.

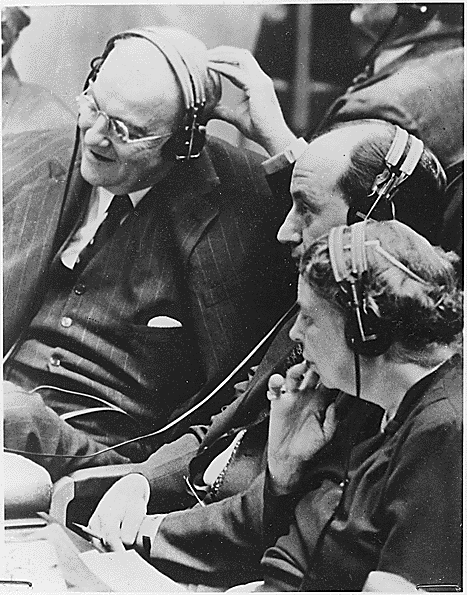
John Foster Dulles, Adlai Stevenson II and Eleanor Roosevelt listening to interpreters at the UN in New York, 1946

== History and evolution ==
The creation of the conference interpreting service – and the interpreting profession itself – at the United Nations has a direct connection with the evolution of international diplomatic relations, the League of Nations, the Nuremberg trials, the founding of the United Nations, and the birth of multilingualism within the United Nations itself.

=== Early days of the interpreting profession ===
Most of the early interpreters of the United Nations were natural polyglots who were uprooted by wars and revolutions. For years, the only criterion used to select potential interpreters was the knowledge of two international languages the interpreters had to communicate in. Polyglots were found mainly in privileged social groups, government employees and professionals in colonial empires, in militarily and diplomatically powerful nations, in political or ideological exiles, in those who leave their countries temporarily for academic purposes, and in children of couples who speak different languages.

After the 1960s, there was change in the sociological make-up of UN interpreters. The United Nations began recruiting and training potential interpreters who were monolingual from birth but had learned and specialized in languages. This generation of interpreters did not come from privileged groups or complex migratory backgrounds.

In contrast with the early beginnings of the profession, there was also a progressive addition of women in the field of conference interpreting.

=== Modern-day conference interpreting ===
At the League of Nations and during the San Francisco Conference (1945) before the formal founding of the United Nations, the interpreters played a vital and visible role in meetings. In consecutive interpretation, conference interpreters speak from the same dais as the original speakers, and the speaker stops periodically so that the interpreter can interpret what has just been said while the participants in the meeting viewed and listened to the consecutive interpreter. The conference interpreters were often exposed to selected or large audiences and the media. In the late 1940s and the early 1950s, United Nations officials introduced simultaneous interpretation as a preferred method for the majority of UN meetings because it saved time and improved the quality of the output. Simultaneous interpreting – a mode that confined the interpreters in glass-encased booths aided with earpieces and microphones – arose in the 1920s and 1930s when American businessman Edward Filene and British engineer A. Gordon-Finlay developed simultaneous interpretation equipment with IBM, and was also used in the post-World War II Nazi war crime trials held in Nuremberg, Germany.

== UN Duty Stations with interpretation or language service offices ==
- United Nations Headquarters (UNHQ), New York City, New York, U.S.
- United Nations Office at Geneva (UNOG), Switzerland
- United Nations Office at Vienna (UNOV), Austria
- United Nations Office at Nairobi (UNON), Kenya
- United Nations Economic Commission for Africa (UNECA), Addis Ababa
- United Nations Economic and Social Commission for Asia and the Pacific (UNESCAP), Bangkok, Thailand
- United Nations Economic and Social Commission for Western Asia (UNESCWA), Beirut, Lebanon
- United Nations Economic Commission for Latin America and the Caribbean (ECLAC), Santiago, Chile

== Organigramme ==
The UN Interpretation Service is composed of the following staff:

- Chief of Service (Chief Interpreter) (1)
- Administrative Staff (Secretaries or Meeting Services Assistants)
- Chiefs of Sections (Heads of Booths or Heads of Sections) (6)
- Interpreters (permanents and freelancers)

== Interpretation Service Sections ==
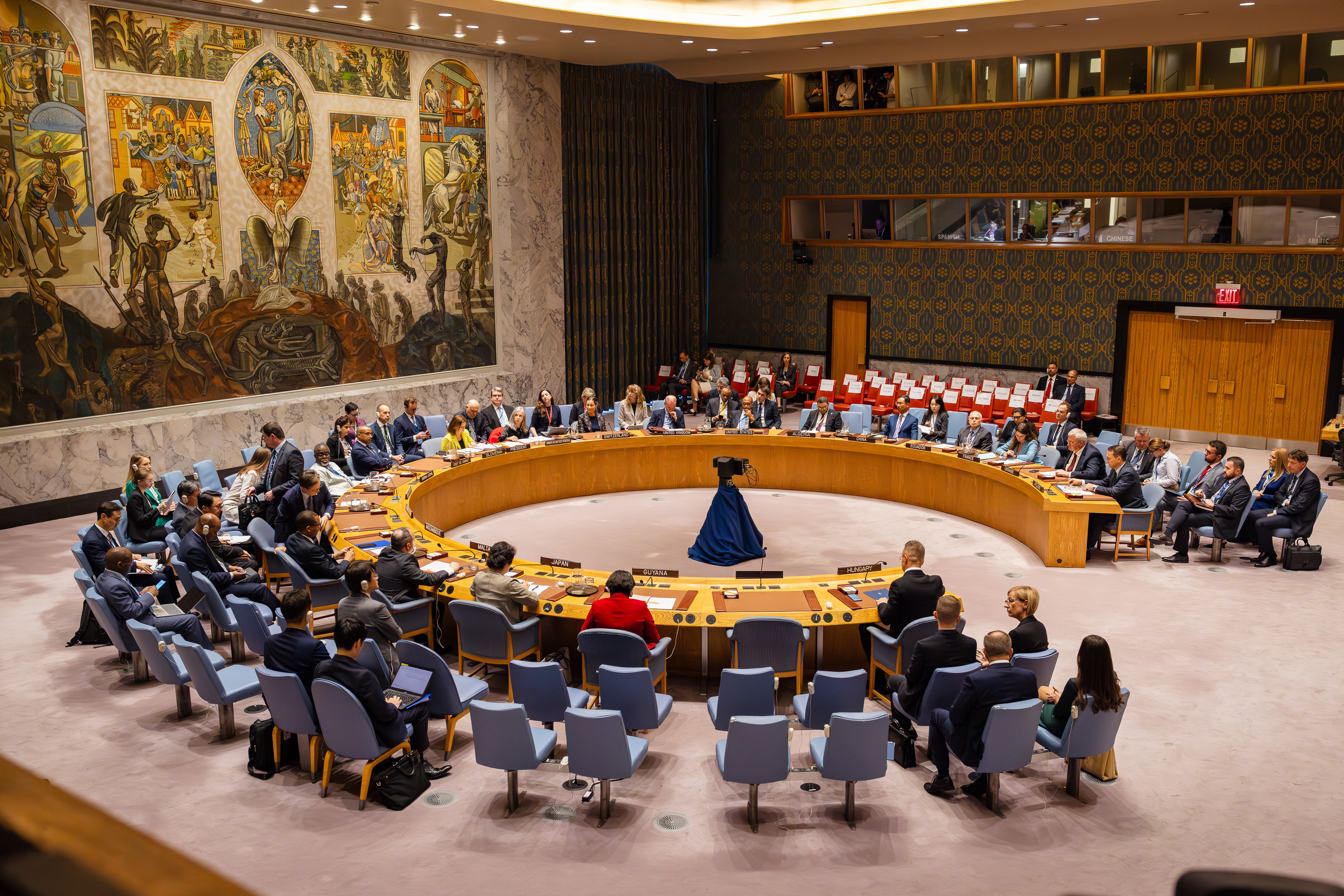
UN interpreters' booths (top right) behind an ongoing UN Security Council session

The UN Interpretation Service is divided into the following sections:

- Arabic Section
- Chinese Section
- English Section
- French Section
- Russian Section
- Spanish Section

== The interpretation system sequence ==
1. The speaker talks to a "microphone discussion system" connected to a central system.
2. The central control system distributes the signal to the audience that do not need interpretation and to the simultaneous interpreter.
3. Audio consoles are placed in the interpretation booths. Interpreters receive the signal, and are still able to capture the environment of the meeting.
4. The interpreter talks to his or her transmitter and the signal goes back to the central console.

== UN interpreters and filmography ==
=== Cinema ===
- The Interpreter, a film by Sydney Pollack, 2005
- The Art of War, Amen Ra Films, 2000
- Charade, Universal Pictures, 1963

== See also ==
- Official languages of the United Nations
- United Nations System
- United Nations General Assembly
- United Nations Security Council
- United Nations Trusteeship Council
- United Nations Secretariat
- International Court of Justice
- International Association of Conference Interpreters
