= List of international presidential trips made by Moon Jae-in =

This is a list of international presidential trips made by Moon Jae-in, the 12th President of South Korea. During his presidency, which began with his inauguration on 10 May 2017 and ended with the inauguration of Yoon Suk-yeol on 10 May 2022. Moon Jae-in made 32 presidential trips to 40 countries internationally.

== Summary of presidential visits ==
The number of visits per country where he travelled are:

- One visit to Argentina, Australia, Austria, Belgium, Brunei, Cambodia, Czech Republic, Denmark, Egypt, Finland, France, Germany, Hungary, India, Indonesia, Kazakhstan, Laos, Malaysia, Myanmar, New Zealand, Norway, Papua New Guinea, Philippines, Saudi Arabia, Spain, Sweden, Turkmenistan and Uzbekistan
- Two visits to China, Italy, Japan, Russia, Singapore, Thailand, United Arab Emirates, United Kingdom, Vatican City and Vietnam
- Three visits to North Korea
- Eight visits to the United States

Map of international trips made by Moon Jae-in as president: One visit Two visits Three visits Four visits 5 visits 6 visits 7 or more visits South Korea

=== 2017 ===
No.	Country	Locations	Dates	Details	Image
1	United States	Washington, D.C.	June 28–July 3	Official working visit. Moon met with President Donald Trump.	
2	Germany	Berlin, Hamburg	July 5–8	Moon attended the G20 summit.	
3	Russia	Vladivostok	September 6–7	Official visit. Moon attended the Eastern Economic Forum.	
4	United States	New York City	September 19–21	Working visit. Moon attended the UN General Assembly. Held a bilateral meeting with President Donald Trump.	
5	Indonesia	Jakarta	November 8–10	Official visit.	
5	Vietnam	Da Nang	November 10–12	Moon attended the APEC summit.	
5	Philippines	Manila	November 12–14	Moon attended the East Asia Summit, ASEAN-Korea Summit, and ASEAN+3 Summit.	
6	China	Beijing	December 13–16	State visit. Moon met with President Xi Jinping.	

=== 2018 ===
No.	Country	Locations	Dates	Details	Image
7	Vietnam	Hanoi	March 22–24	Official visit.	
7	United Arab Emirates	Abu Dhabi, Dubai	March 24–27	Official visit.	
8	North Korea	Panmunjom	April 27	Moon attended the Inter-Korean summit with Chairman Kim Jong Un.	
9	Japan	Tokyo	May 9	Moon attended the China–Japan–South Korea trilateral summit.	
10	United States	Washington, D.C.	May 21–24	Working visit. Moon met with President Donald Trump.	
10	North Korea	Panmunjom	May 26	Moon attended the Inter-Korean summit with Chairman Kim Jong Un.	
11	Russia	Moscow	June 21–23	State visit. Moon attended the 2018 FIFA World Cup.	
12	India	New Delhi	July 8–11	State visit. Moon met with Prime Minister Narendra Modi.	
12	Singapore	Singapore	July 12–14	State visit. Moon met with Prime Minister Lee Hsien Loong.	
13	North Korea	Pyongyang	September 18–20	Moon attended the Inter-Korean summit with Chairman Kim Jong Un.	
14	United States	New York City	September 24–26	Working visit. Moon attended the UN General Assembly. Held a bilateral meeting with President Donald Trump and signed revisions to the U.S.–Korean free trade agreement.	
15	France	Paris	October 13–16	State visit. Moon met with President Emmanuel Macron.	
15	Italy	Rome	October 16–17	Official visit. Moon met with Prime Minister Giuseppe Conte.	
15	Vatican City	Vatican City	October 18	Official visit. Moon met with Pope Francis.	
15	Belgium	Brussels	October 18–19	Moon attended the Asia–Europe Meeting.	
15	Denmark	Copenhagen	October 19–20	Official visit. Moon attended the 1st P4G Summit.	
16	Singapore	Singapore	November 14–16	Moon attended the East Asia Summit, ASEAN-Korea Summit, and ASEAN+3 Summit.	
16	Papua New Guinea	Port Moresby	November 16–18	Moon attended the APEC summit.	
17	Czech Republic	Prague	November 27–28	Official visit.	
17	Argentina	Buenos Aires	November 29–December 1	Moon attended the G20 summit.	
17	New Zealand	Auckland	December 2–4	State visit.	

=== 2019 ===
No.	Country	Locations	Dates	Details	Image
18	Brunei	Bandar Seri Begawan	March 10–12	State visit.	
18	Malaysia	Kuala Lumpur	March 12–14	State visit. Moon met with Prime Minister Mahathir Mohamad.	
18	Cambodia	Phnom Penh	March 14–16	State visit.	
19	United States	Washington, D.C.	April 10–12	Working visit. Moon met with President Donald Trump.	
20	Turkmenistan	Ashgabat	April 16–18	State visit.	
20	Uzbekistan	Tashkent, Samarkand	April 18–21	State visit.	
20	Kazakhstan	Nur-Sultan	April 21	State visit.	
21	Finland	Helsinki	June 9–11	State visit.	
21	Norway	Oslo	June 11–13	State visit.	
21	Sweden	Stockholm	June 13–15	State visit.	
22	Japan	Osaka	June 27–29	Moon attended the G20 summit.	
23	Thailand	Bangkok	September 1–3	Official visit.	
23	Myanmar	Myanmar	September 3–5	Official visit.	
23	Laos	Laos	September 5–6	Official visit.	
24	United States	New York City	September 22–26	Working visit. Moon attended the UN General Assembly. Held a bilateral meeting with President Donald Trump.	
25	Thailand	Bangkok	November 3–5	Working visit. Moon attended the East Asia Summit, ASEAN-Korea Summit, and ASEAN+3 Summit.	
26	China	Chengdu	December 23–25	Working visit. Moon attended the China–Japan–South Korea trilateral summit. Also held a bilateral meeting with President Xi Jinping and Japanese Prime Minister Shinzō Abe.	

=== 2020 ===
In 2020, Moon did not make any international trips, due to the COVID-19 pandemic.

=== 2021 ===
No.	Country	Locations	Dates	Details	Image
27	United States	Washington, D.C.	May 20–21	Working visit. Moon met with President Joe Biden. Moon was the second foreign leader to visit Biden at the White House.	
28	United Kingdom	Cornwall	June 11–13	Working visit. Moon attended the G7 summit. Also held a bilateral meeting with Australian Prime Minister Scott Morrison, German Chancellor Angela Merkel, President of the European Council Charles Michel, President of the European Commission Ursula von der Leyen, British Prime Minister Boris Johnson and French President Emmanuel Macron.	
28	Austria	Vienna	June 13–15	State visit. Moon met with President Alexander Van der Bellen. Also met with Chancellor Sebastian Kurz.	
28	Spain	Madrid	June 15–17	State visit. Moon met with King Felipe VI. Also met with Prime Minister Pedro Sánchez.	
29	United States	New York City	September 19–23	Working visit. Moon attended the UN General Assembly.	
30	Vatican City	Vatican City	October 29	Official visit. Moon met with Pope Francis.	
30	Italy	Rome	October 30–31	Working visit. Moon attended the G20 summit. Also held a bilateral meeting with German Chancellor Angela Merkel, Australian Prime Minister Scott Morrison, French President Emmanuel Macron and President of the European Commission Ursula von der Leyen.	
30	United Kingdom	Glasgow	November 1–2	Working visit. Moon attended the United Nations Climate Change Conference.	
30	Hungary	Budapest	November 2–4	State visit. Moon met with Prime Minister Viktor Orbán. Attended the 2nd Korea-V4 summit. Also held a bilateral meeting with President János Áder, Slovak Prime Minister Eduard Heger, Polish Prime Minister Mateusz Morawiecki and Czech Prime Minister Andrej Babiš.	
31	Australia	Canberra	December 12–15	State visit. Moon met with Prime Minister Scott Morrison. Also met with Governor-General David Hurley.	

=== 2022 ===
No.	Country	Locations	Dates	Details	Image
32	United Arab Emirates	Dubai, Abu Dhabi	January 16–17	Working visit. Moon met with Vice President Mohammed bin Rashid Al Maktoum.	
32	Saudi Arabia	Riyadh	January 18–19	Official visit. Moon met with Crown Prince Mohammed bin Salman.	
32	Egypt	Cairo	January 20–21	Official visit. Moon met with President Abdel Fattah el-Sisi.	

== Multilateral meetings ==
Moon Jae-in attended the following summits as South Korean President.

Group	Year				
Group	2017	2018	2019	2020	2021
UNGA	19–21 September, (United States) New York City	24–26 September, (United States) New York City	23–25 September, (United States) New York City	22 September, (virtual) (United States) New York City	19–23 September, (United States) New York City
ASEM	None	18–19 October, (Belgium) Brussels	None	(postponed)	25–26 November, (virtual) (Cambodia) Phnom Penh
P4G	None	19–20 October, (Denmark) Copenhagen	None	(postponed)	30 May, (virtual) (South Korea) Seoul
EAS (ASEAN+3)	13–14 November, (Philippines) Pasay	14–15 November, Singapore	4 November, (Thailand) Bangkok	14 November, (virtual) (Vietnam) Hanoi	26–28 October, (virtual) (Brunei) Bandar Seri Begawan
ASEAN-Korea	13 November, (Philippines) Maynila	14 November, Singapore	26 November, (South Korea) Busan	12 November, (virtual) (Vietnam) Hanoi	26 October, (virtual) (Brunei) Bandar Seri Begawan
APEC	10–11 November, (Vietnam) Đà Nẵng	17–18 November (Papua New Guinea) Port Moresby	16–17 November, (cancelled) (Chile) Santiago	20 November, (virtual) (Malaysia) Kuala Lumpur	12 November, (virtual) (New Zealand) Auckland
G20	7–8 July, (Germany) Hamburg	30 November – 1 December, (Argentina) Buenos Aires	28–29 June, (Japan) Osaka	21–22 November, (virtual) (Saudi Arabia) Riyadh	30–31 October, (Italy) Rome
China–Japan–Korea	None	9 May, (Japan) Tokyo	23–25 December, (China) Chengdu	None	None
Others			Mekong-Korea; 27 November, (South Korea) Busan	Mekong-Korea; 13 November, (virtual) (Vietnam) Hanoi	G7; 11–13 June, (United Kingdom) Carbis Bay
Others			Mekong-Korea; 27 November, (South Korea) Busan	Mekong-Korea; 13 November, (virtual) (Vietnam) Hanoi	UNCCC; 1–2 November, (United Kingdom) Glasgow
Others			Mekong-Korea; 27 November, (South Korea) Busan	Mekong-Korea; 13 November, (virtual) (Vietnam) Hanoi	V4-Korea; 4 November, (Hungary) Budapest
██ = Virtual event

== See also ==
- List of international trips made by presidents of South Korea
