= Fifteenth East Asia Summit =

International forum

- Host country: Vietnam
- Date: 14 November 2020
- Cities: Hanoi
- Participants: EAS members
- Follows: Fourteenth East Asia Summit
- Precedes: Sixteenth East Asia Summit

The Fifteenth East Asia Summit was held in Hanoi, Vietnam on 14 November 2020. The East Asia Summit is an annual meeting of national leaders from the East Asian region and adjoining countries. EAS has evolved as forum for strategic dialogue and cooperation on political, security and economic issues of common regional concern and plays an important role in the regional architecture.

== Attending delegations ==
The heads of state and heads of government of the eighteen countries participated in the summit. The host of the 2020 East Asian Summit is also the Chairperson of ASEAN, the Prime Minister of Vietnam, Nguyễn Xuân Phúc. The summit was held through video conference.

=== Gallery ===
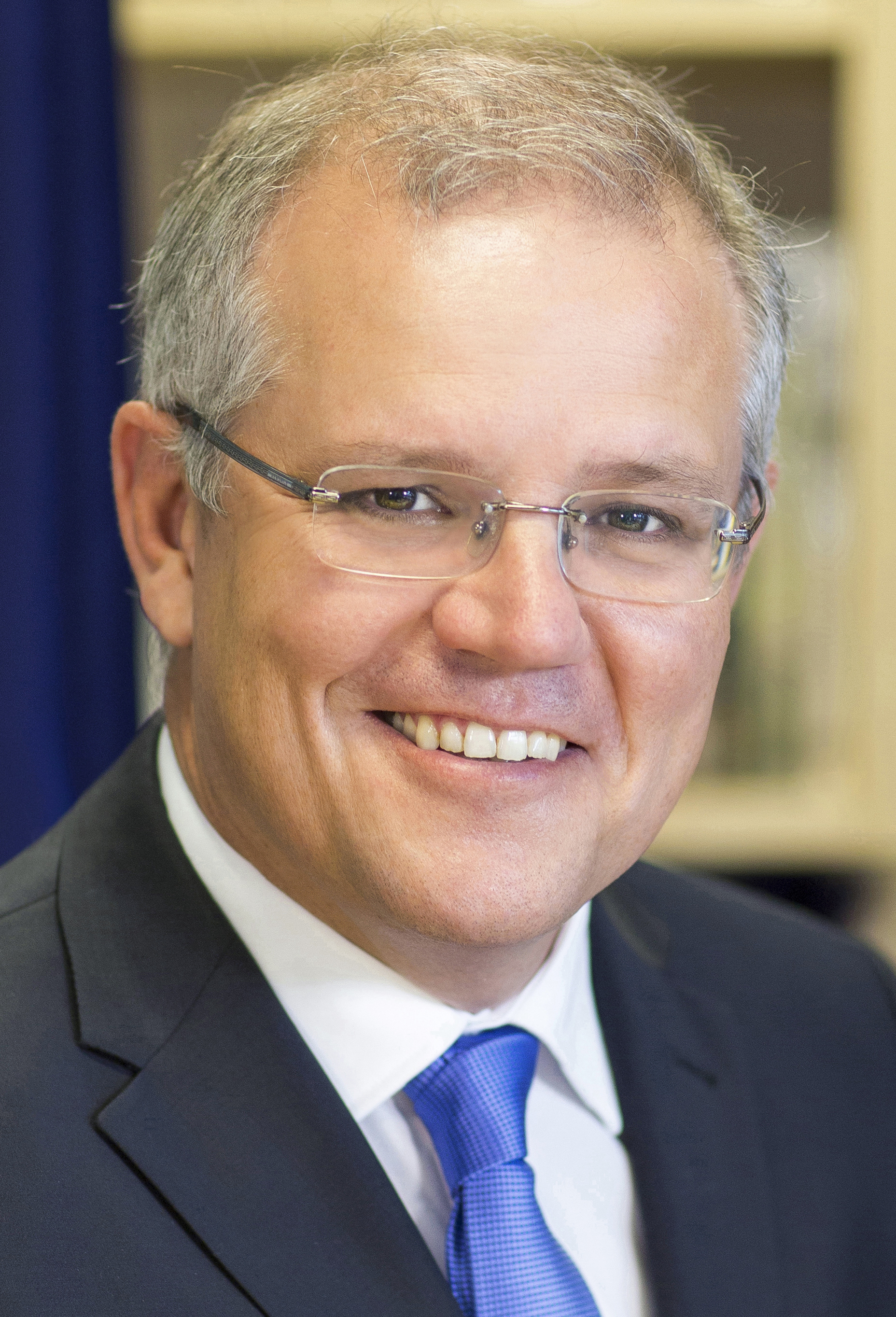
Australia
Prime Minister Scott Morrison

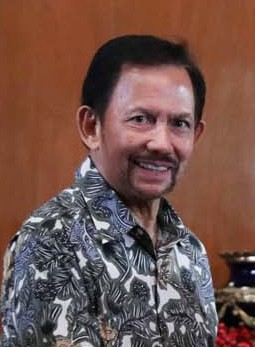
Brunei
Sultan Hassanal Bolkiah

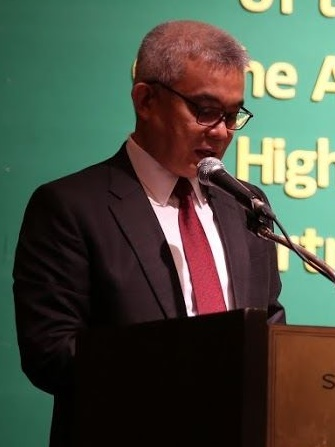
Cambodia
Deputy Prime Minister Aun Pornmoniroth

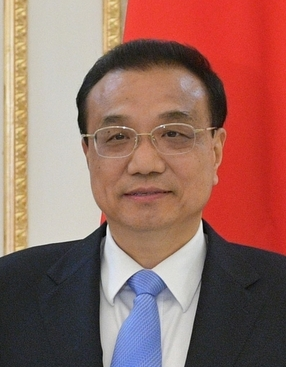
(China) China
Premier Li Keqiang

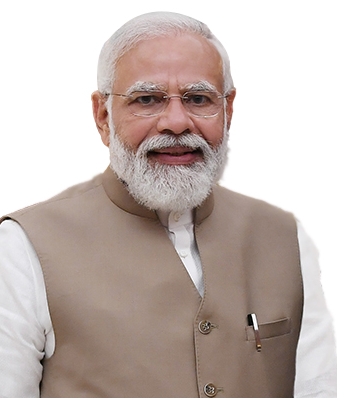
(India) India
Prime Minister Narendra Modi

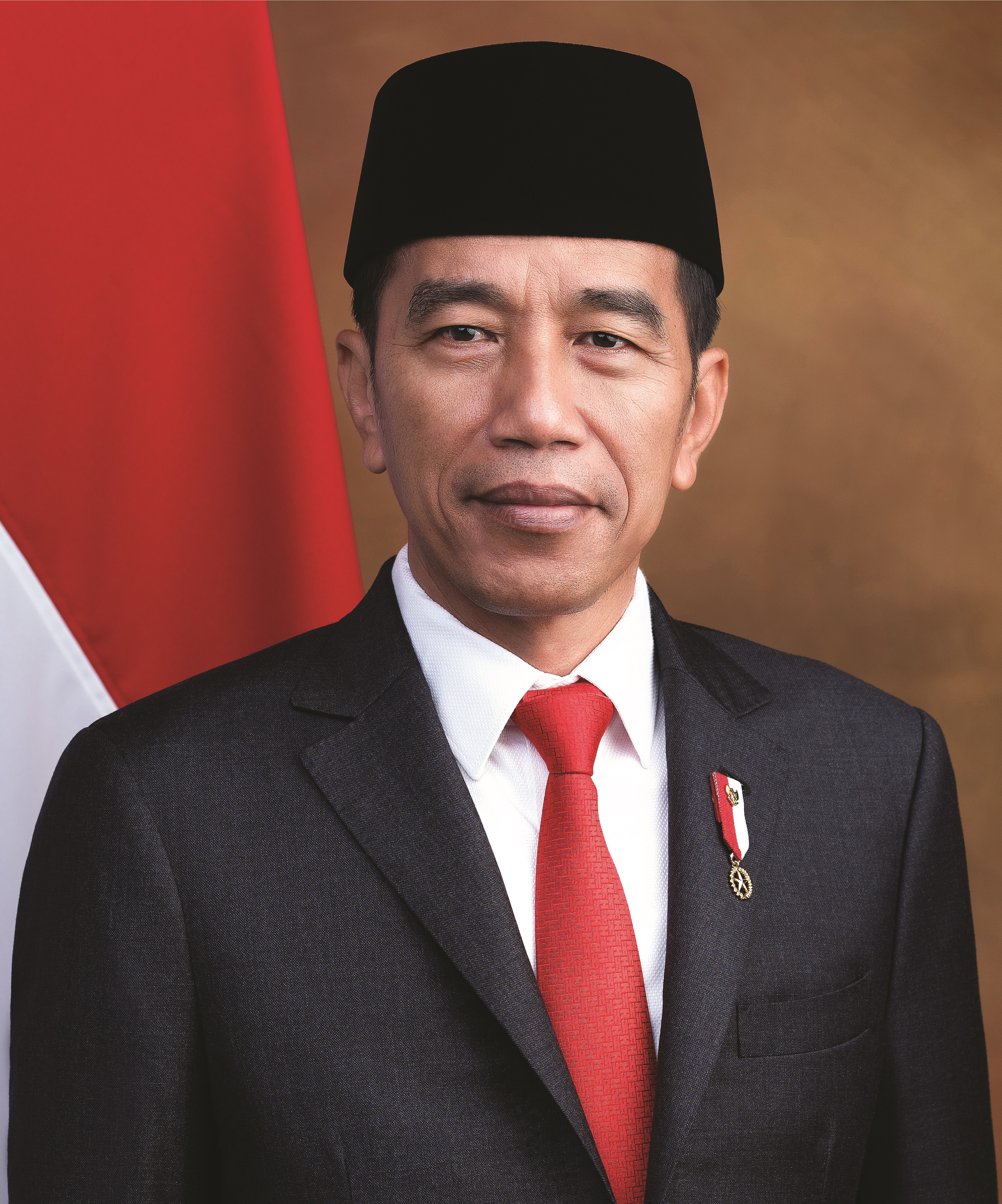
(Indonesia) Indonesia
President Joko Widodo

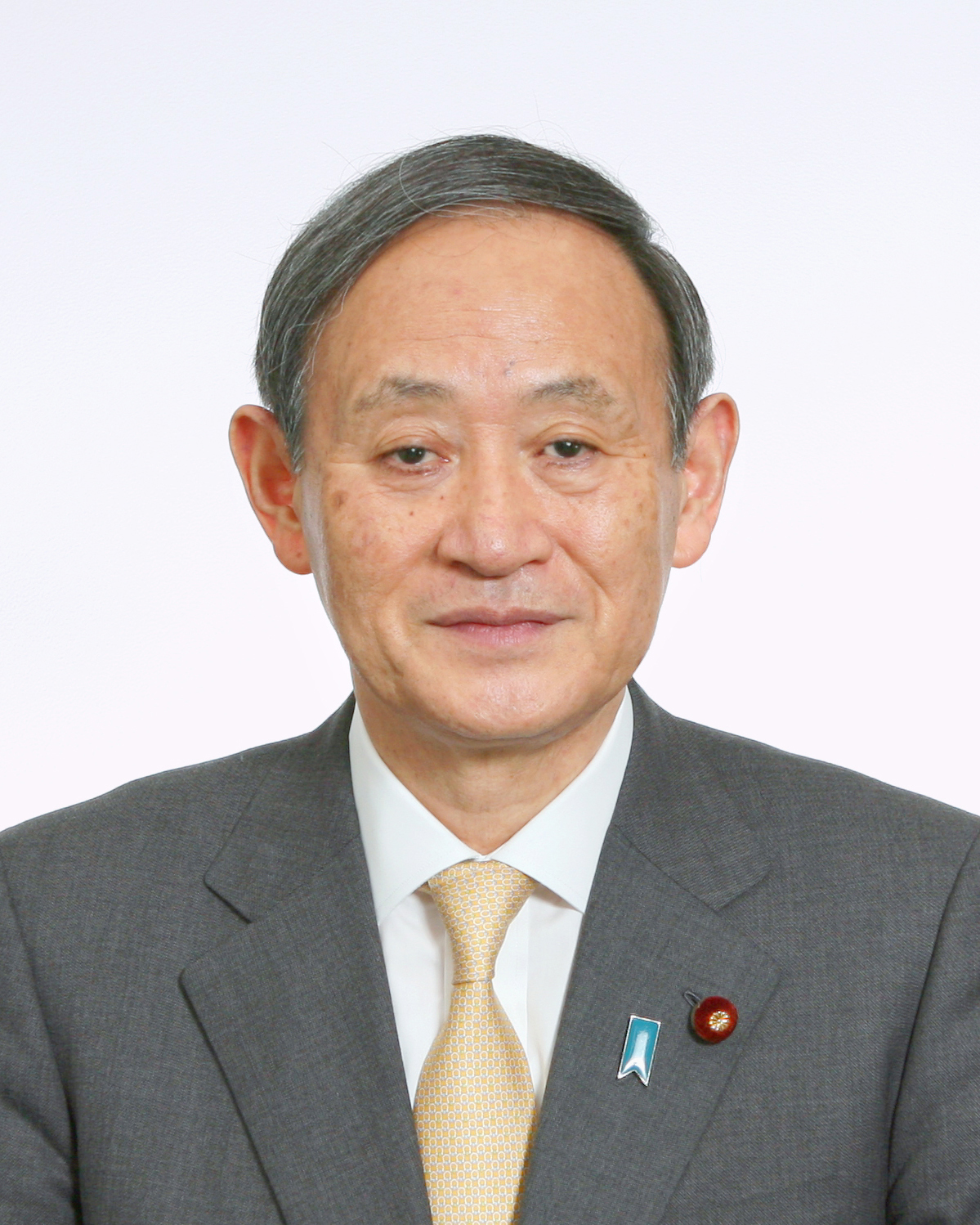
(Japan) Japan
Prime Minister Yoshihide Suga

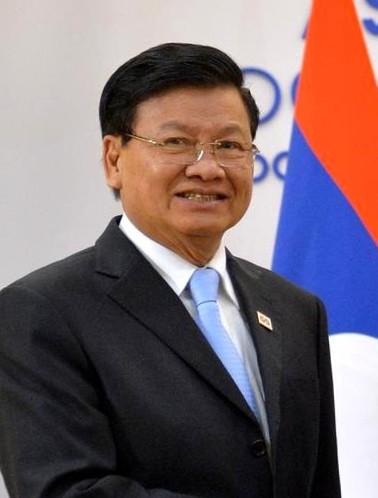
(Laos) Laos
Prime Minister Thongloun Sisoulith

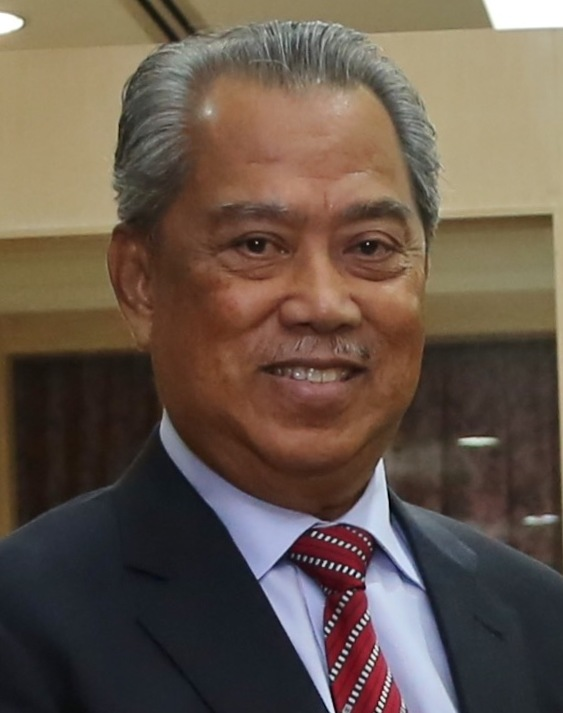
(Malaysia) Malaysia
Prime Minister Muhyiddin Yassin

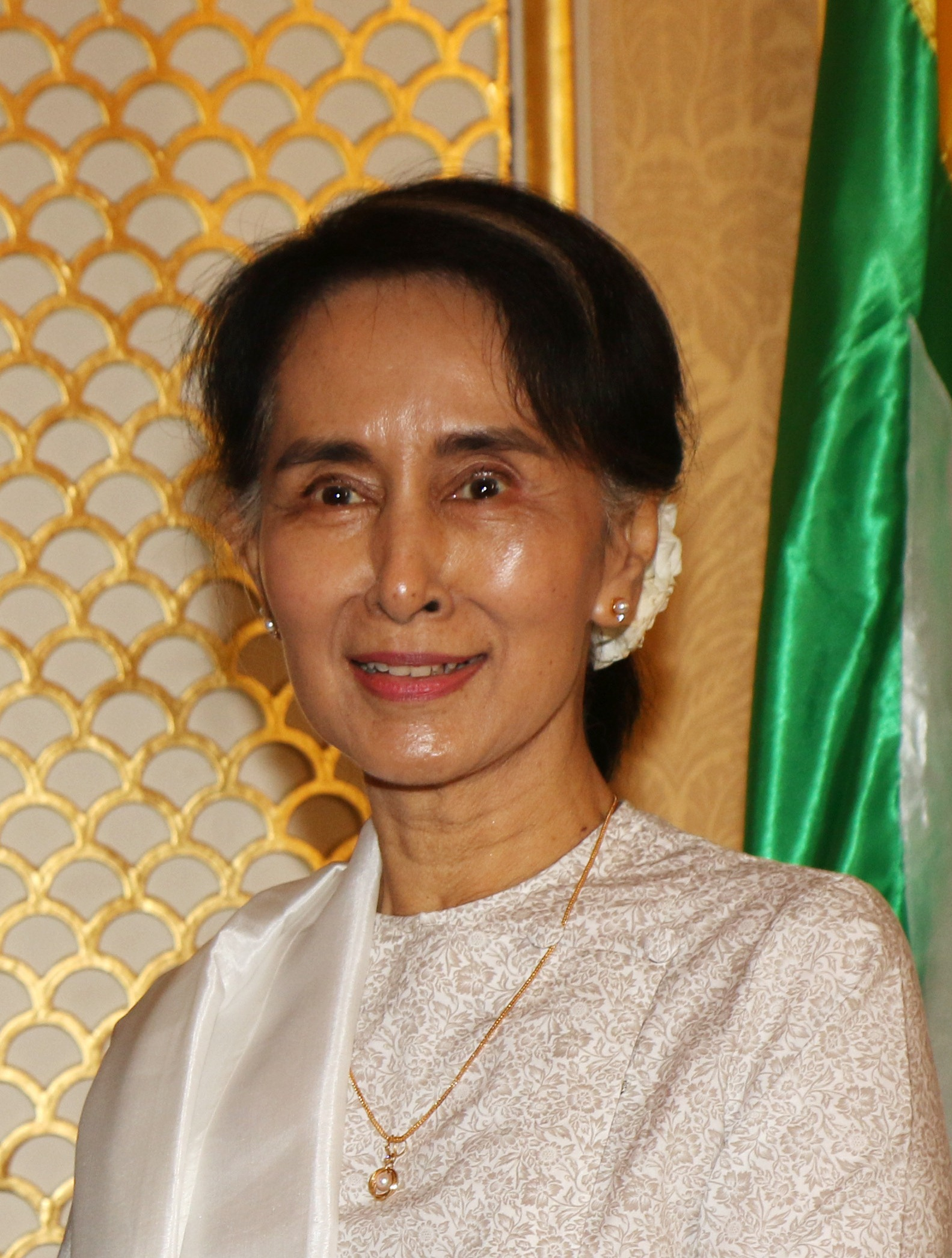
Myanmar
State Counsellor Aung San Suu Kyi

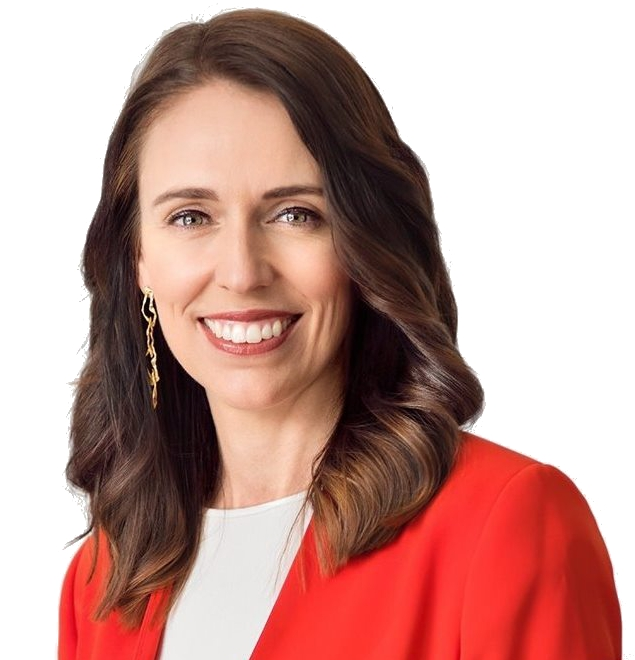
(New Zealand) New Zealand
Prime Minister Jacinda Ardern

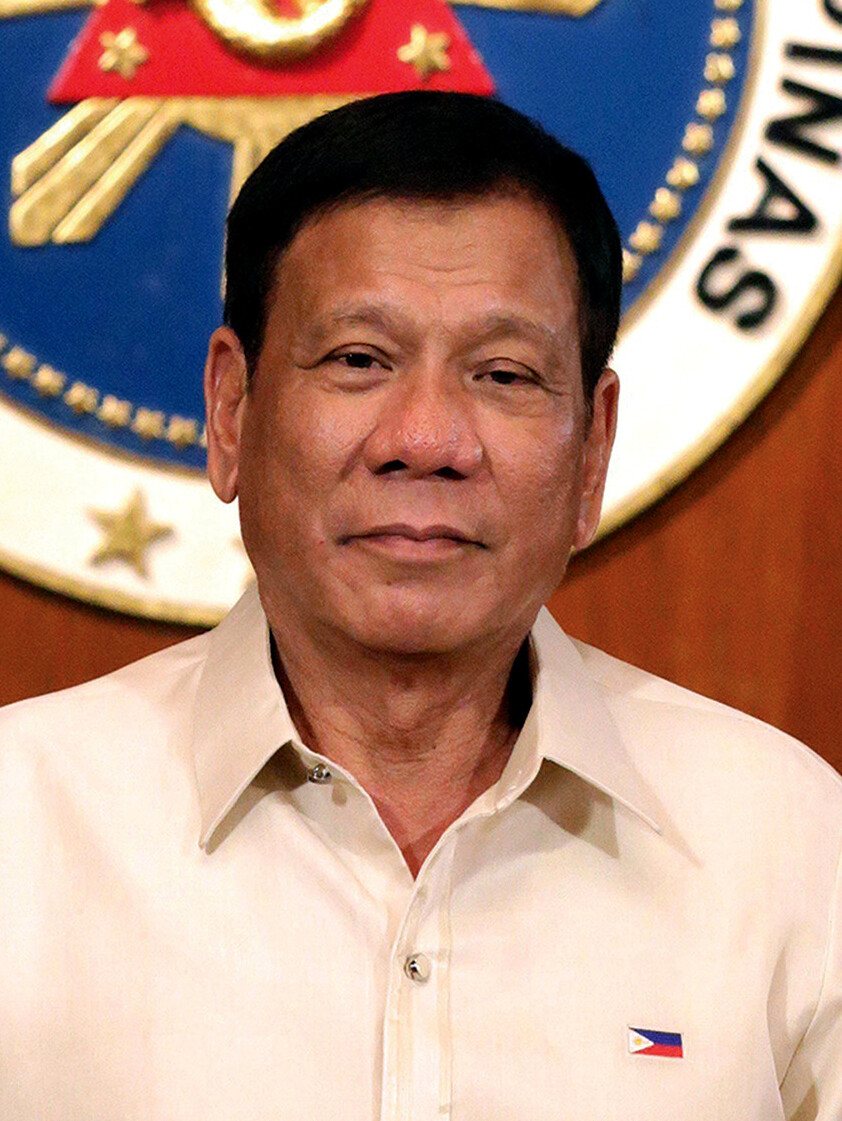
(Philippines) Philippines
President Rodrigo Duterte

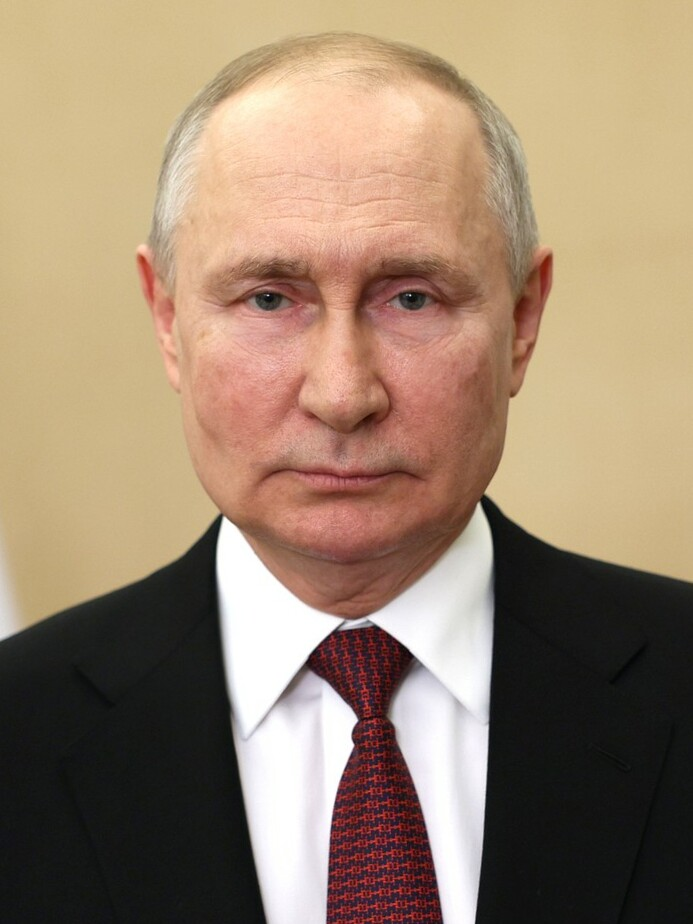
(Russia) Russia
President Vladimir Putin

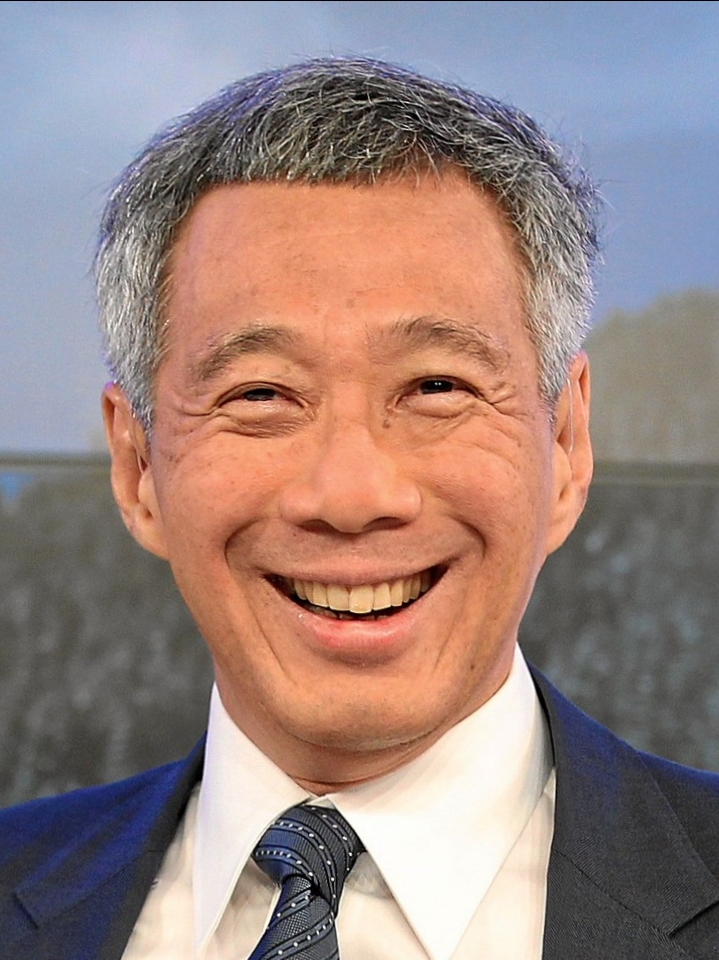
(Singapore) Singapore
Prime Minister Lee Hsien Loong

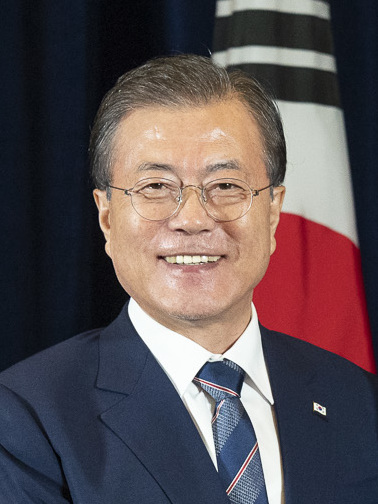
(South Korea) South Korea
President Moon Jae-in

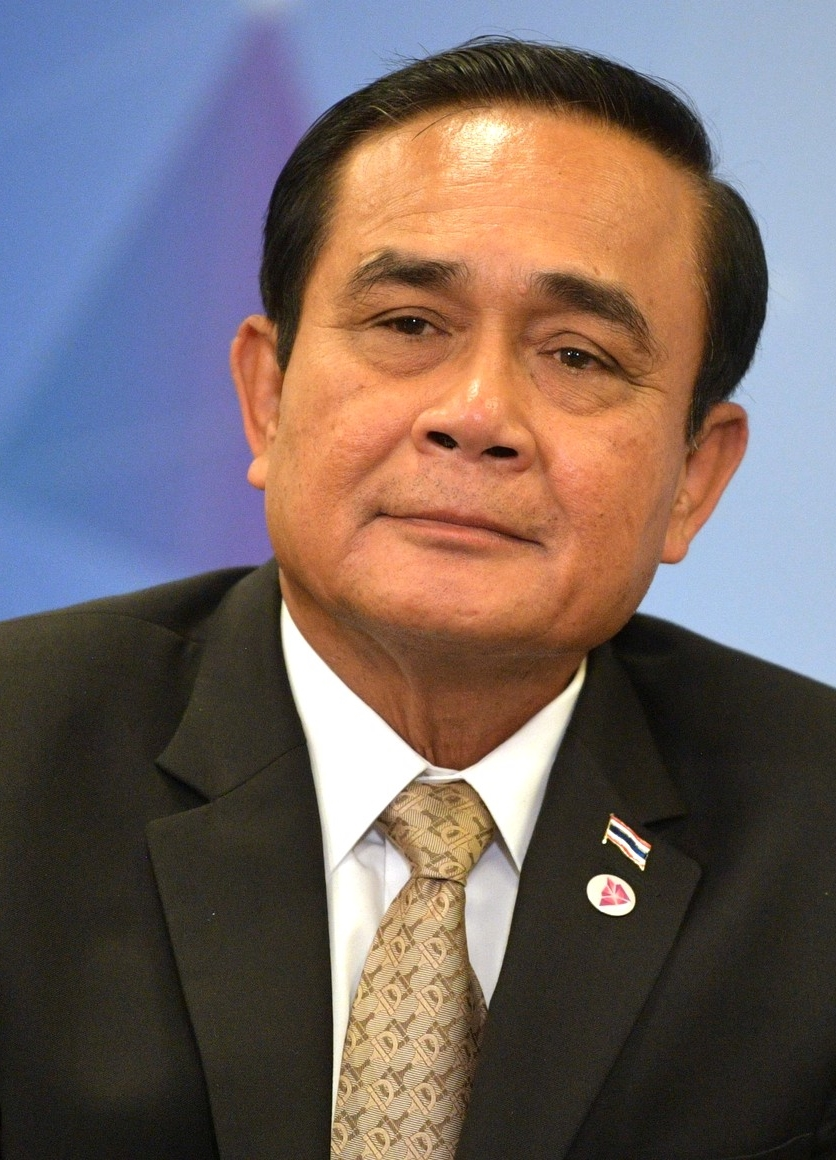
(Thailand) Thailand
Prime Minister Prayuth Chan-ocha

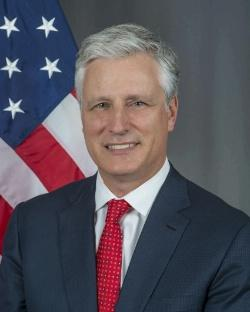
(United States) United States
National Security Advisor Robert O' Brien

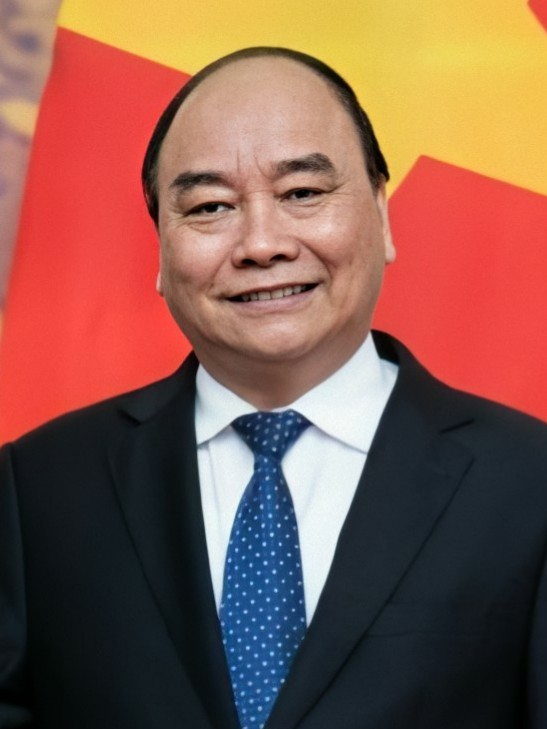
(Vietnam) Vietnam
Prime Minister Nguyễn Xuân Phúc (Chairperson)
