= Sixteenth East Asia Summit =

- Host country: Brunei
- Date: 26–27 October 2021
- Cities: Bandar Seri Begawan
- Participants: EAS members
- Follows: Fifteenth East Asia Summit
- Precedes: Seventeenth East Asia Summit

The Sixteenth East Asia Summit was held in Bandar Seri Begawan, Brunei on 26–27 October 2021. The East Asia Summit is an annual meeting of national leaders from the East Asian region and adjoining countries. EAS has evolved as forum for strategic dialogue and cooperation on political, security and economic issues of common regional concern and plays an important role in the regional architecture.

== Attending delegations ==
The heads of state and heads of government of the seventeen countries participated in the summit. The host of the 2021 East Asian Summit is also the Chairperson of ASEAN, the Sultan of Brunei, Hassanal Bolkiah. The summit was held through video conference.

ASEAN downgraded Myanmar's representation and did not allow the Prime Minister of Myanmar, Min Aung Hlaing, to participate in the summit due the 2021 coup d'état. Myanmar did not send any representatives.

=== Gallery ===
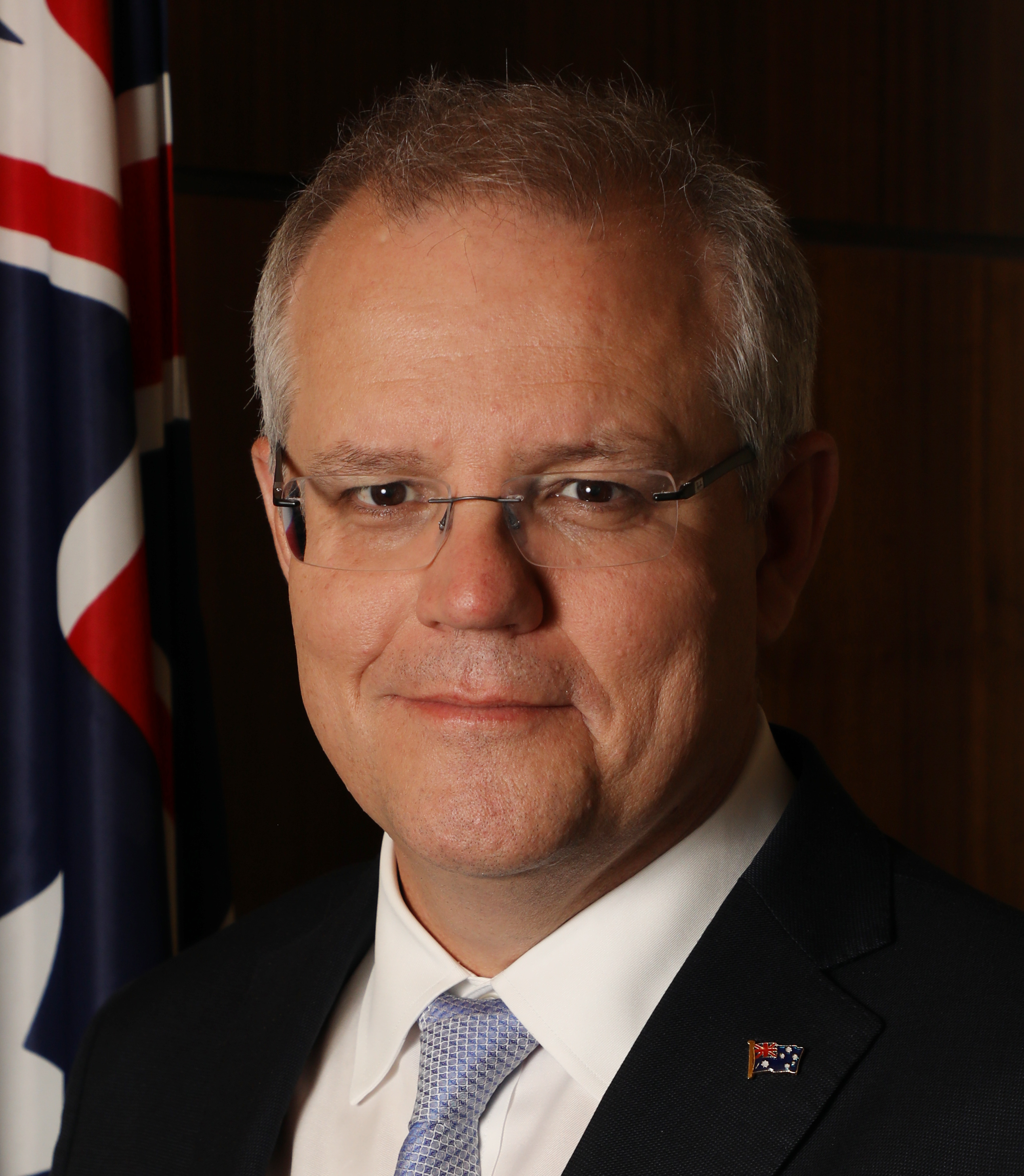
Australia
Prime Minister Scott Morrison

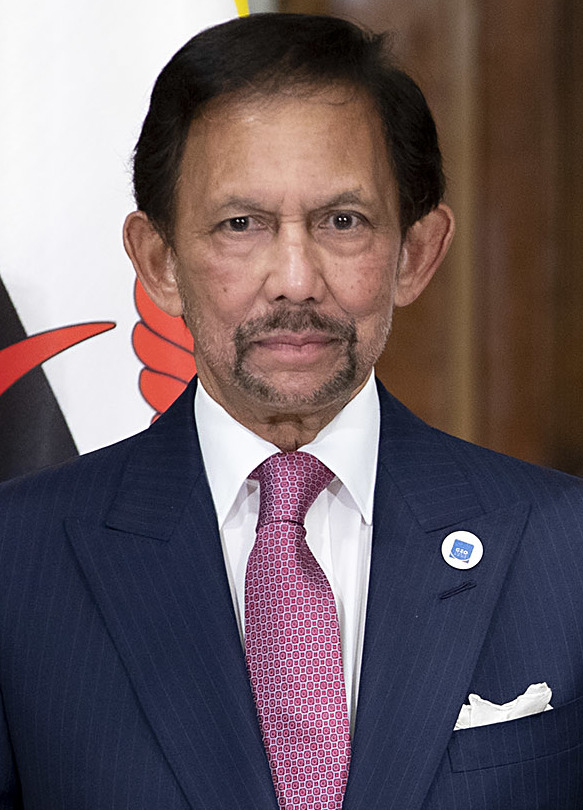
Brunei
Sultan Hassanal Bolkiah (Chairperson)

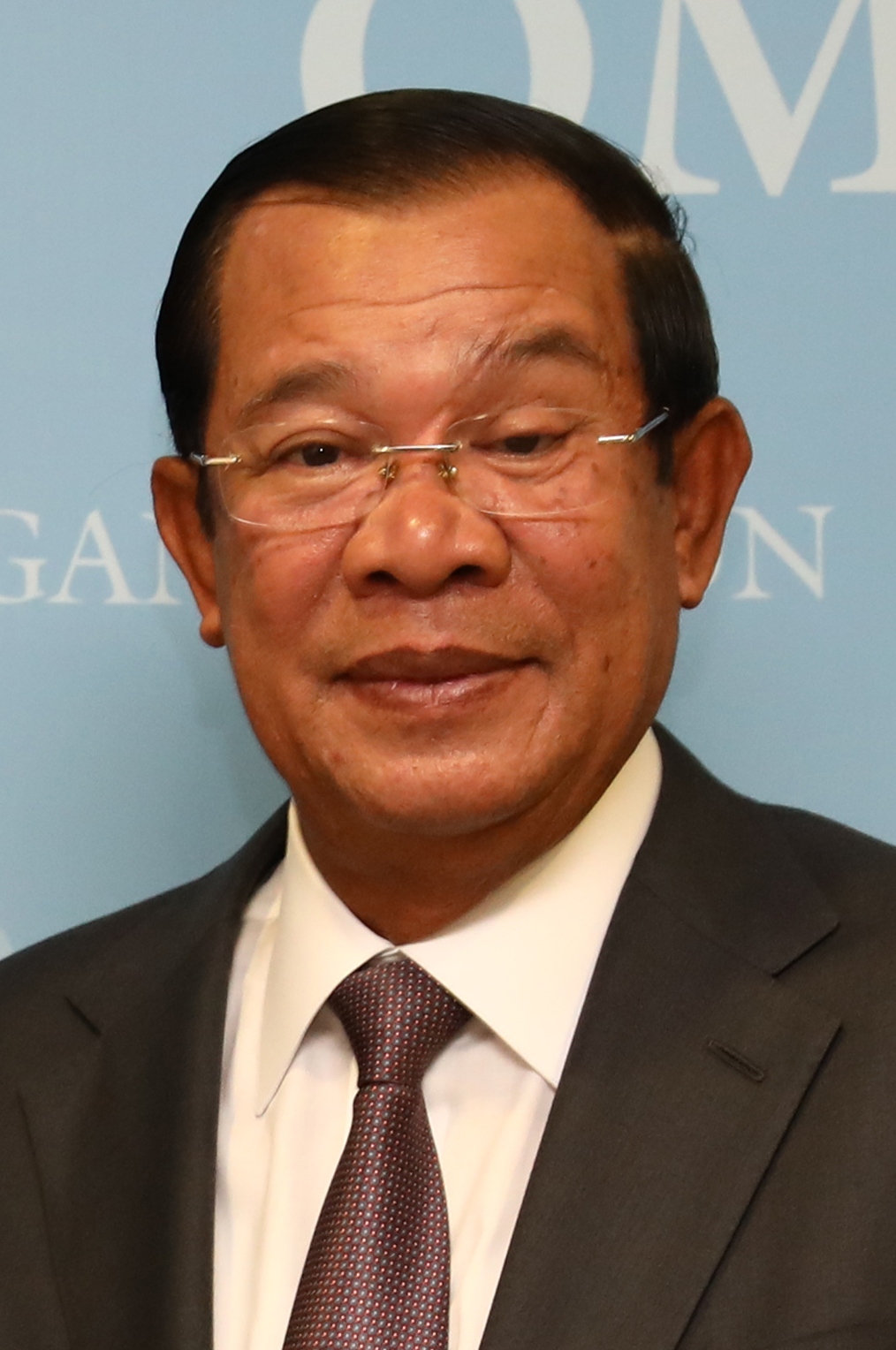
Cambodia
Prime Minister Hun Sen

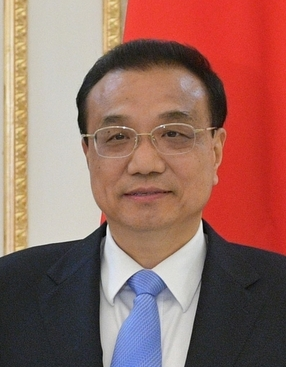
(China) China
Premier Li Keqiang

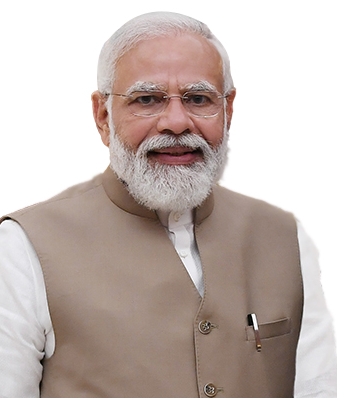
(India) India
Prime Minister Narendra Modi

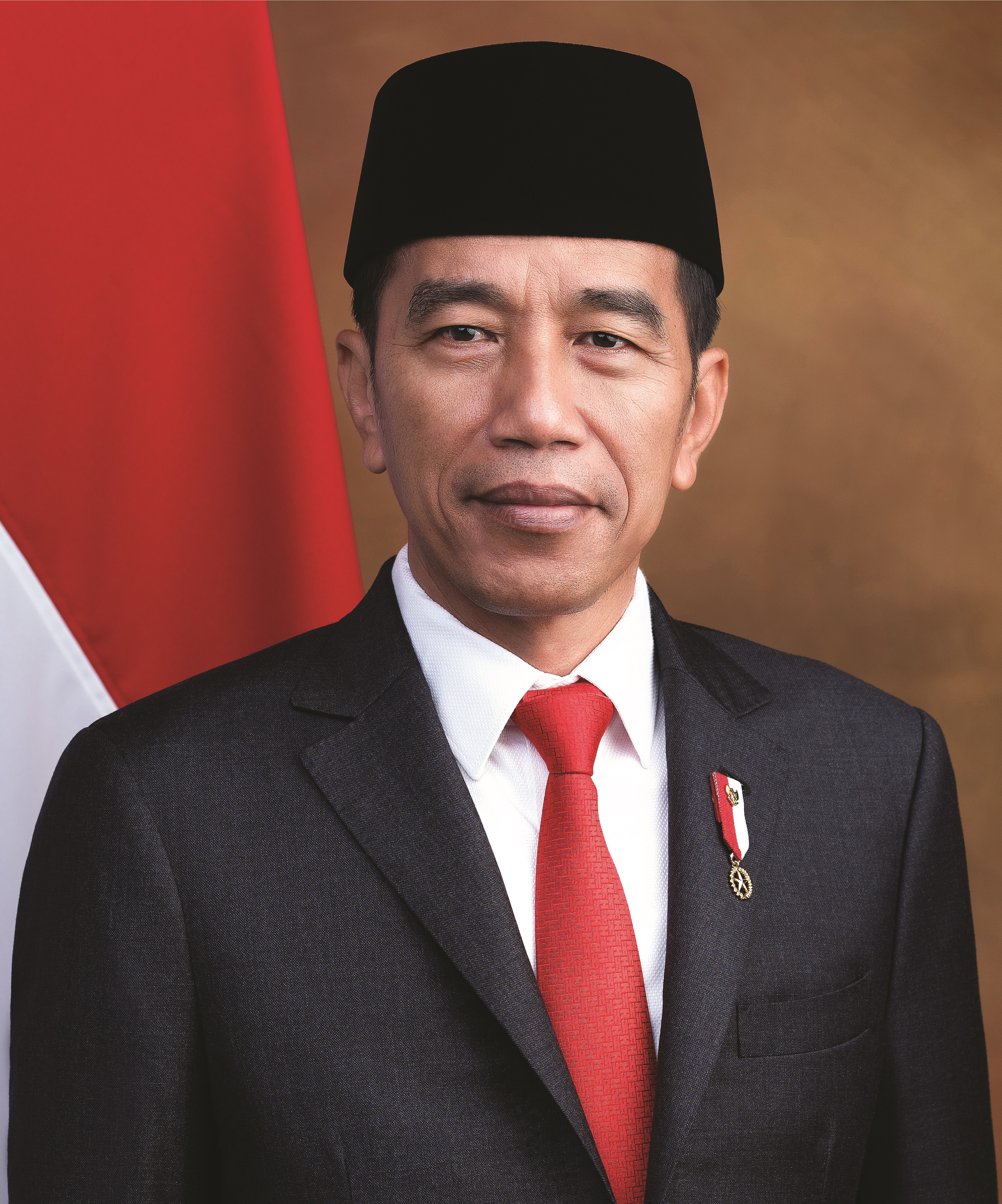
(Indonesia) Indonesia
President Joko Widodo

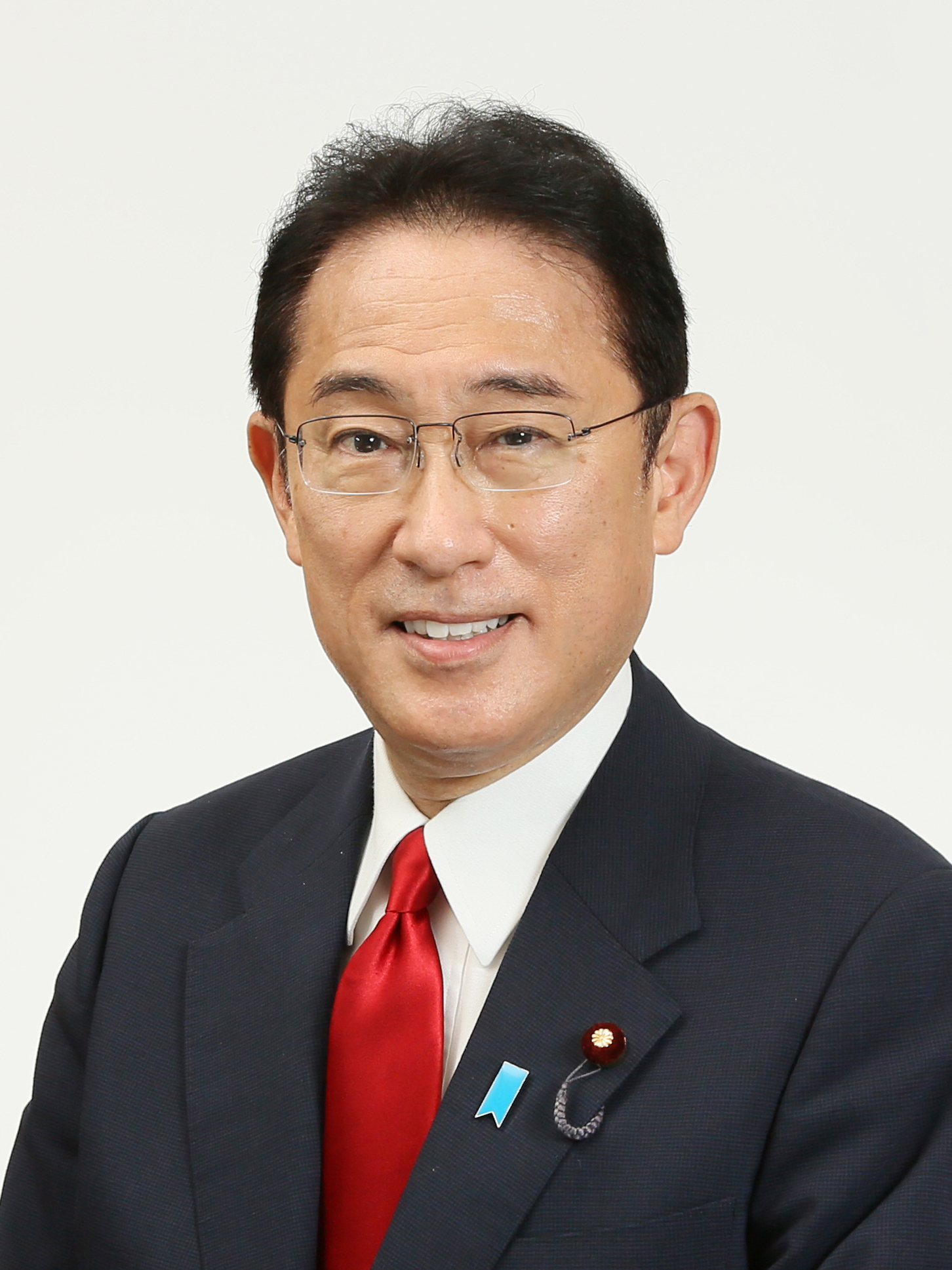
(Japan) Japan
Prime Minister Fumio Kishida

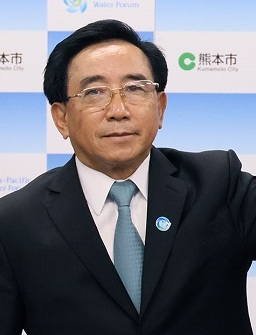
(Laos) Laos
Prime Minister Phankham Viphavanh

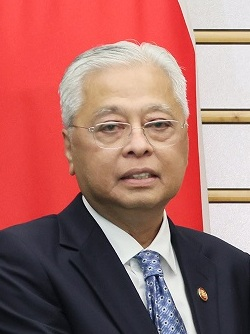
(Malaysia) Malaysia
Prime Minister Ismail Sabri Yaakob

(Myanmar) Myanmar
Prime Minister Min Aung Hlaing was excluded from participating
Seat reserved

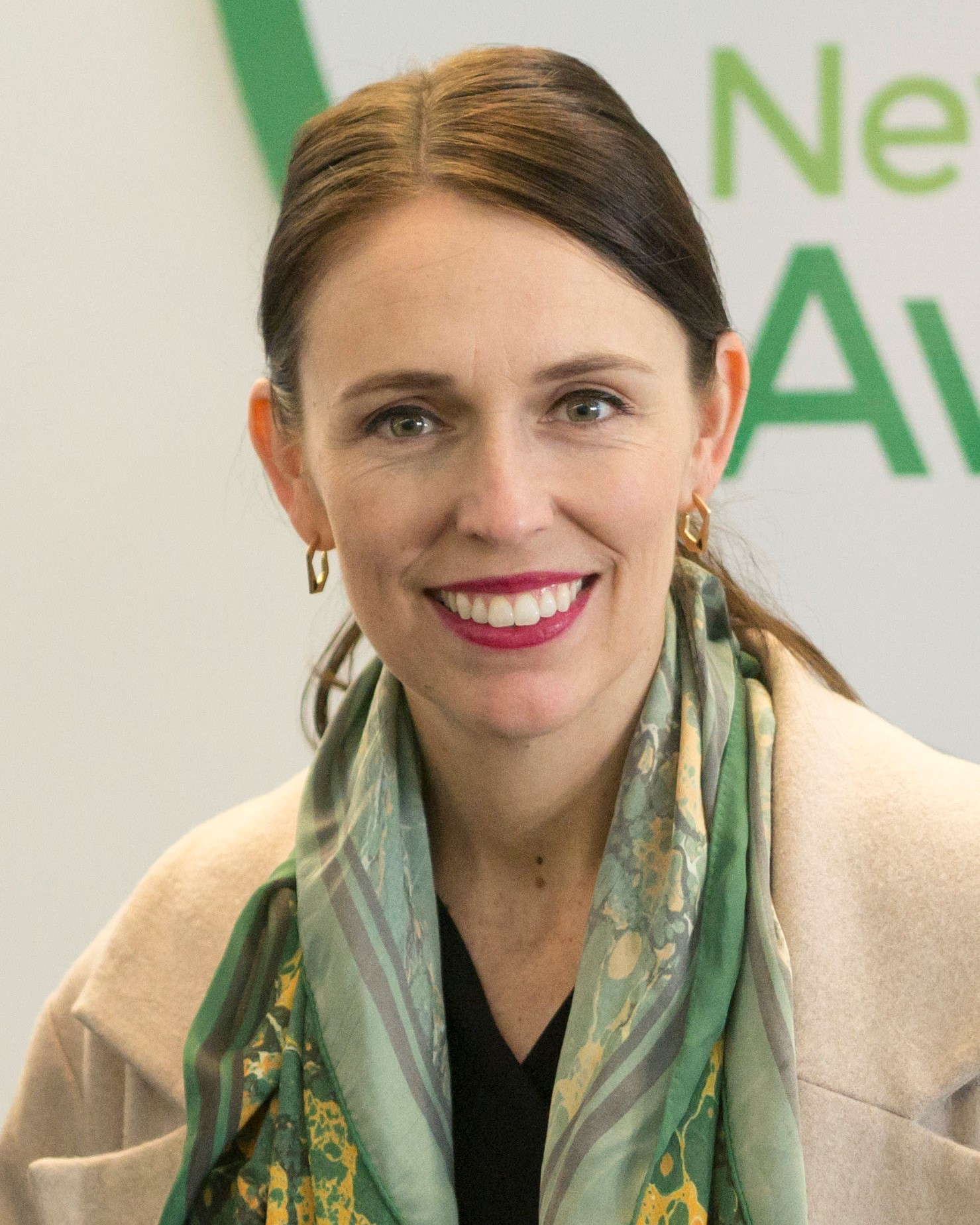
(New Zealand) New Zealand
Prime Minister Jacinda Ardern

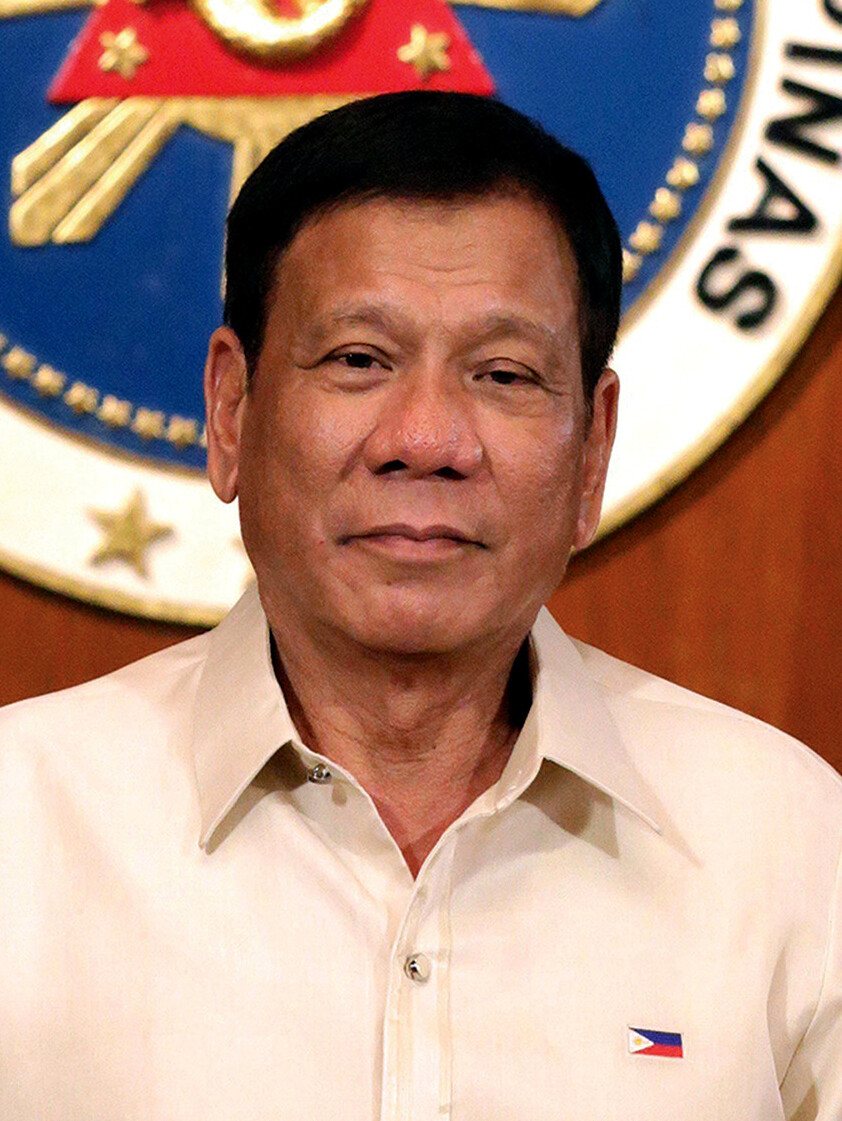
(Philippines) Philippines
President Rodrigo Duterte

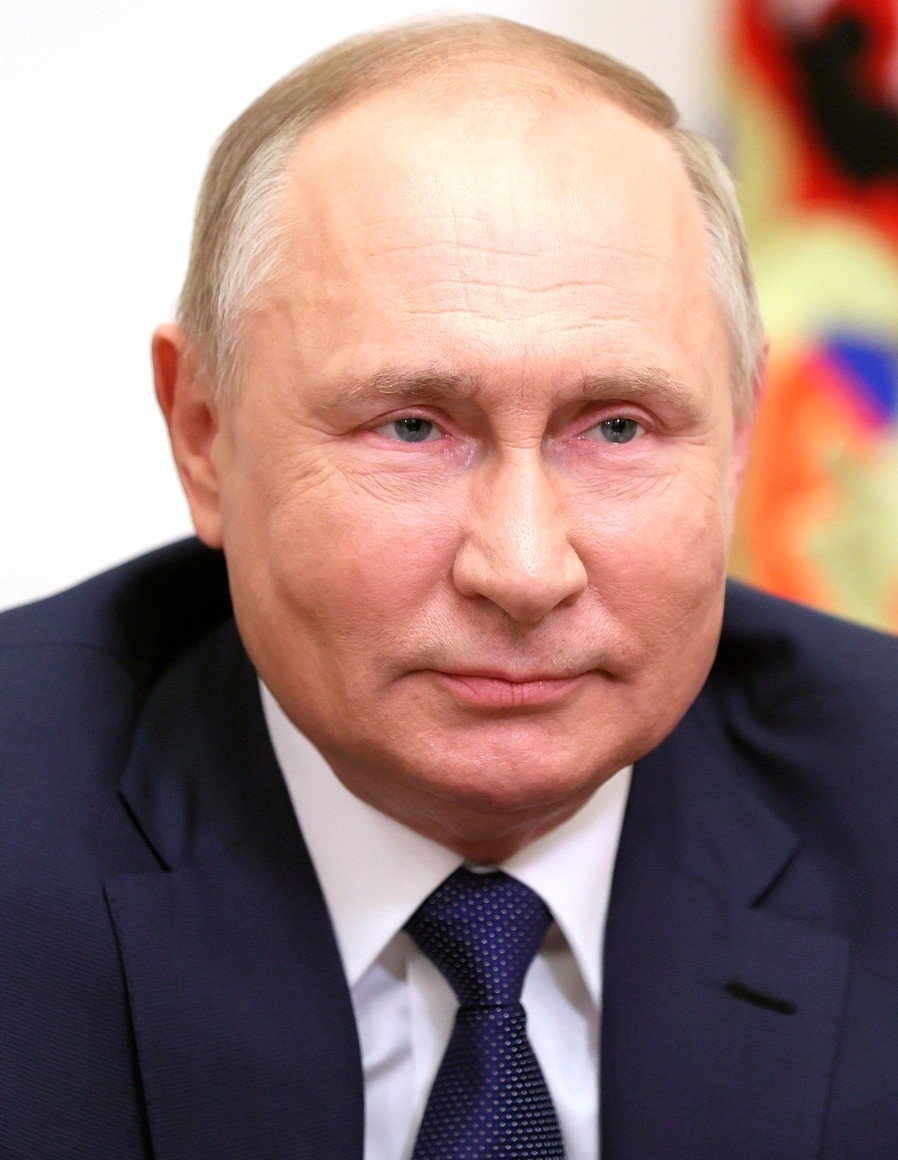
(Russia) Russia
President Vladimir Putin

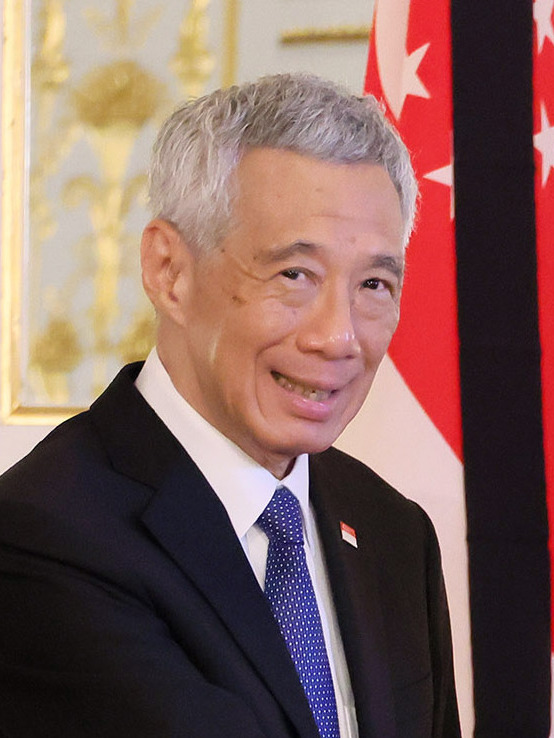
(Singapore) Singapore
Prime Minister Lee Hsien Loong

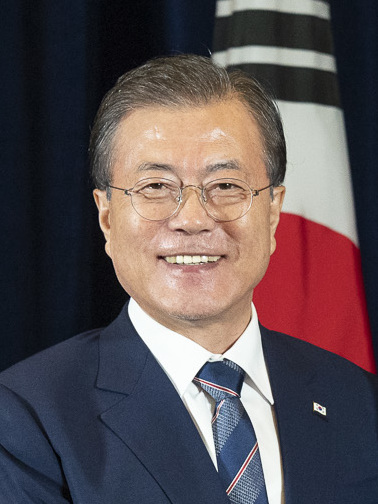
(South Korea) South Korea
President Moon Jae-in

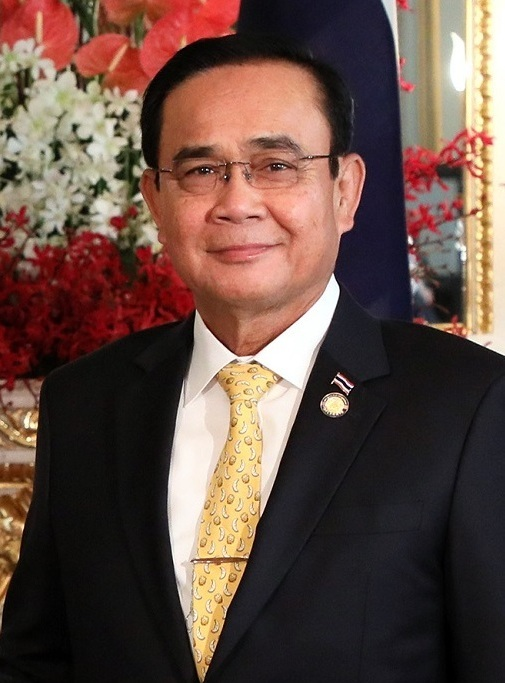
(Thailand) Thailand
Prime Minister Prayuth Chan-ocha

(United States) United States
President Joe Biden

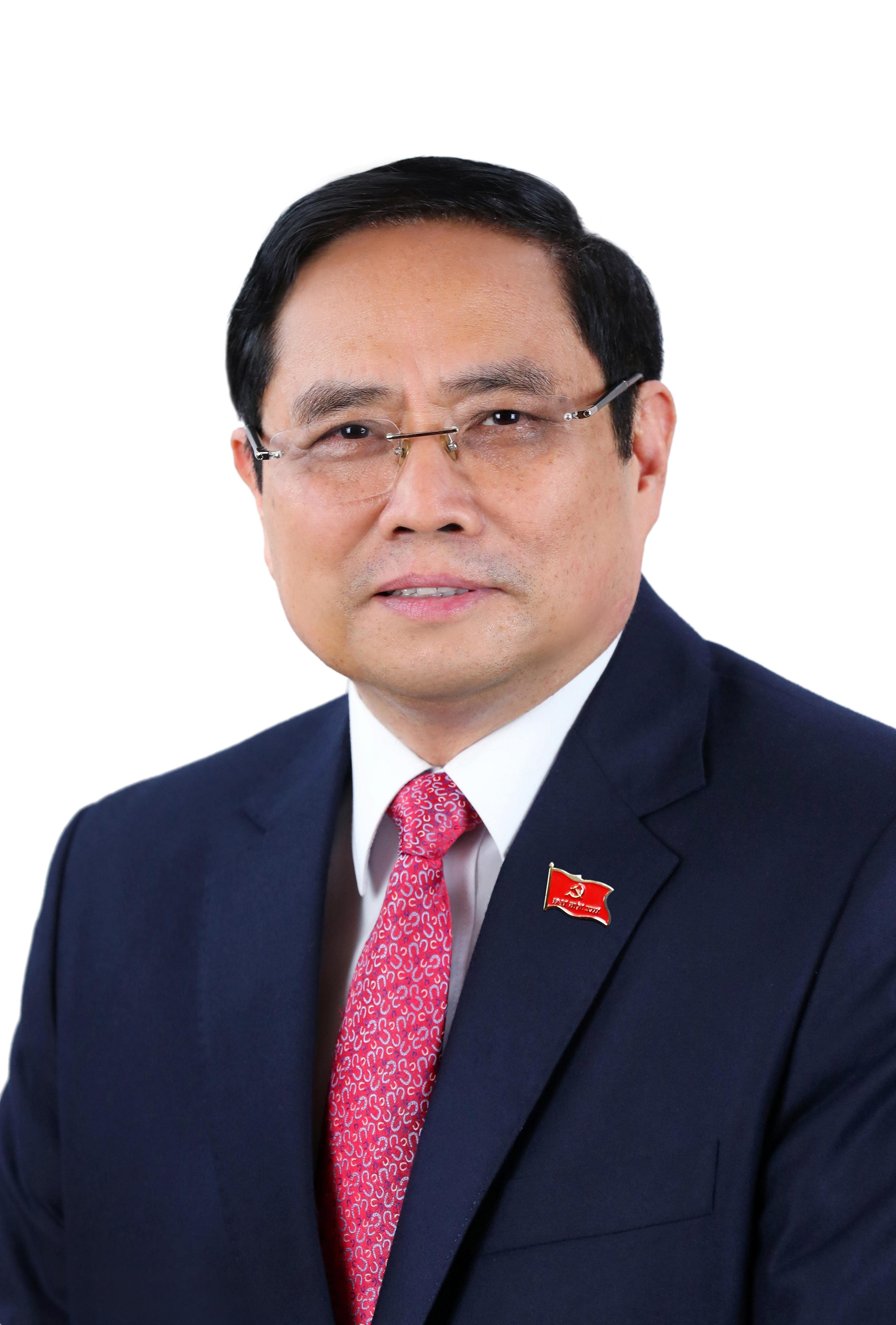
(Vietnam) Vietnam
Prime Minister Phạm Minh Chính

=== Guest Invitees ===
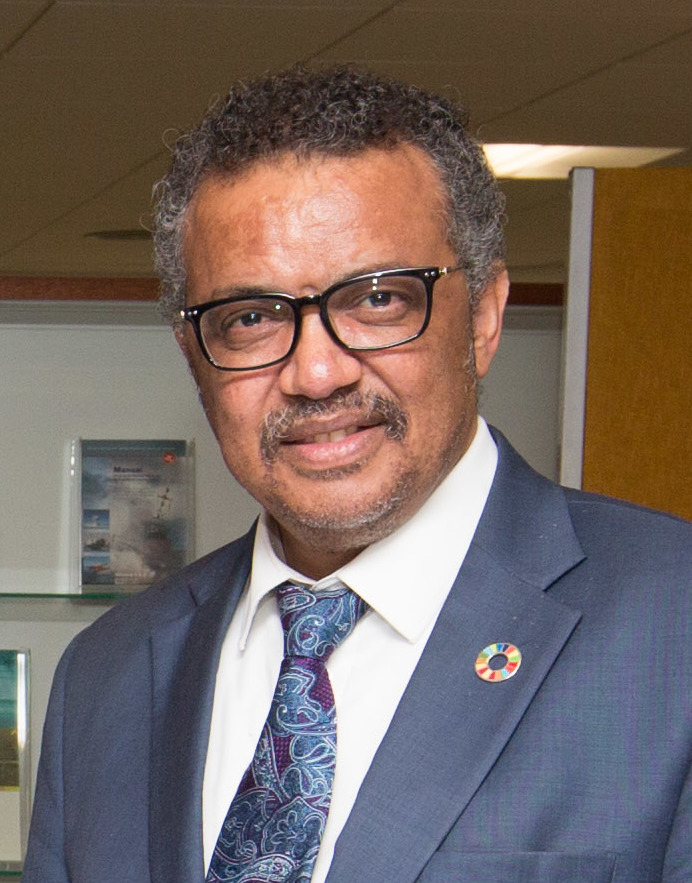
World Health Organization
Tedros Adhanom Ghebreyesus, Director-General

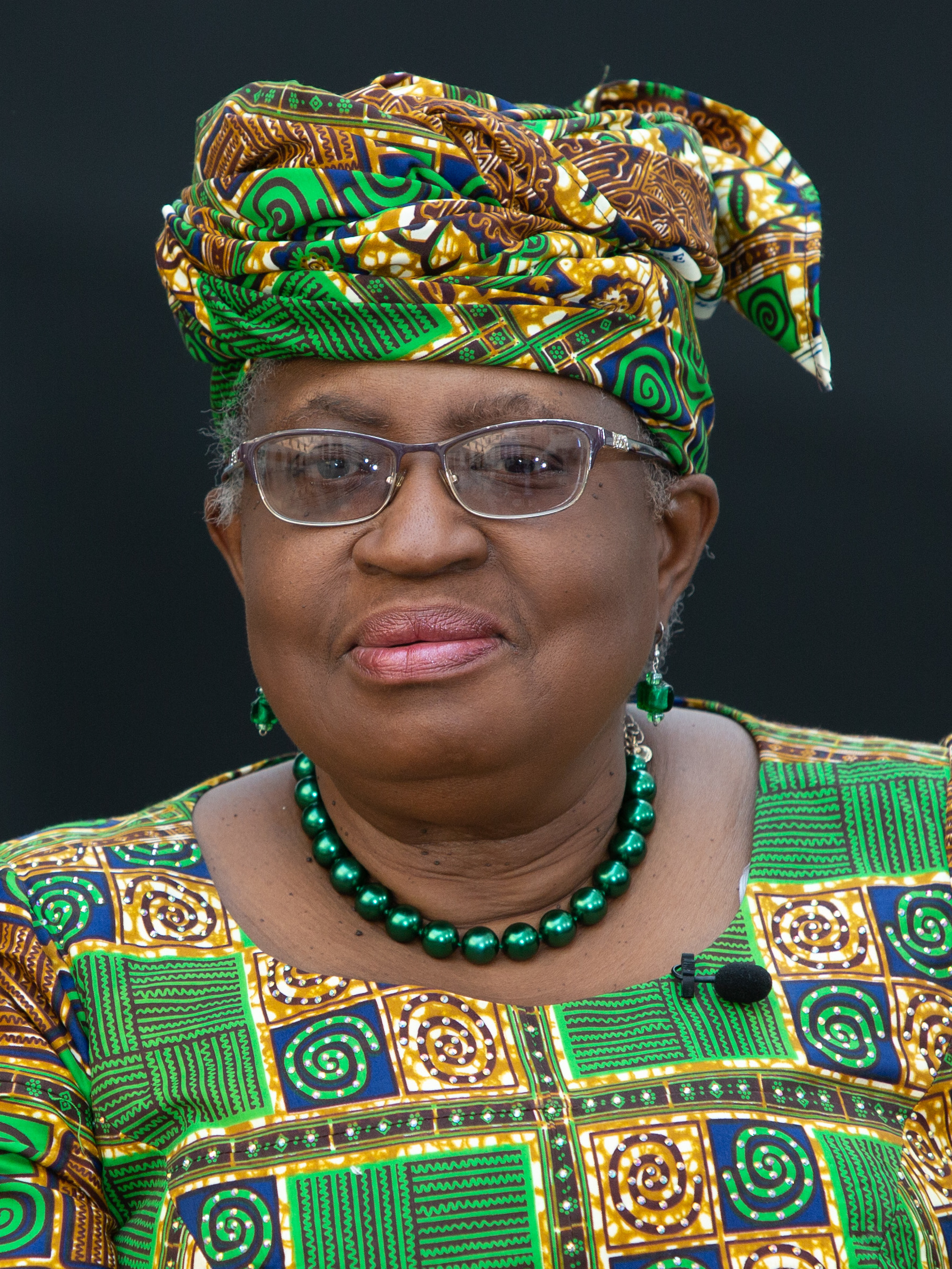
World Trade Organization
Ngozi Okonjo-Iweala, Director-General
