= Fourteenth East Asia Summit =

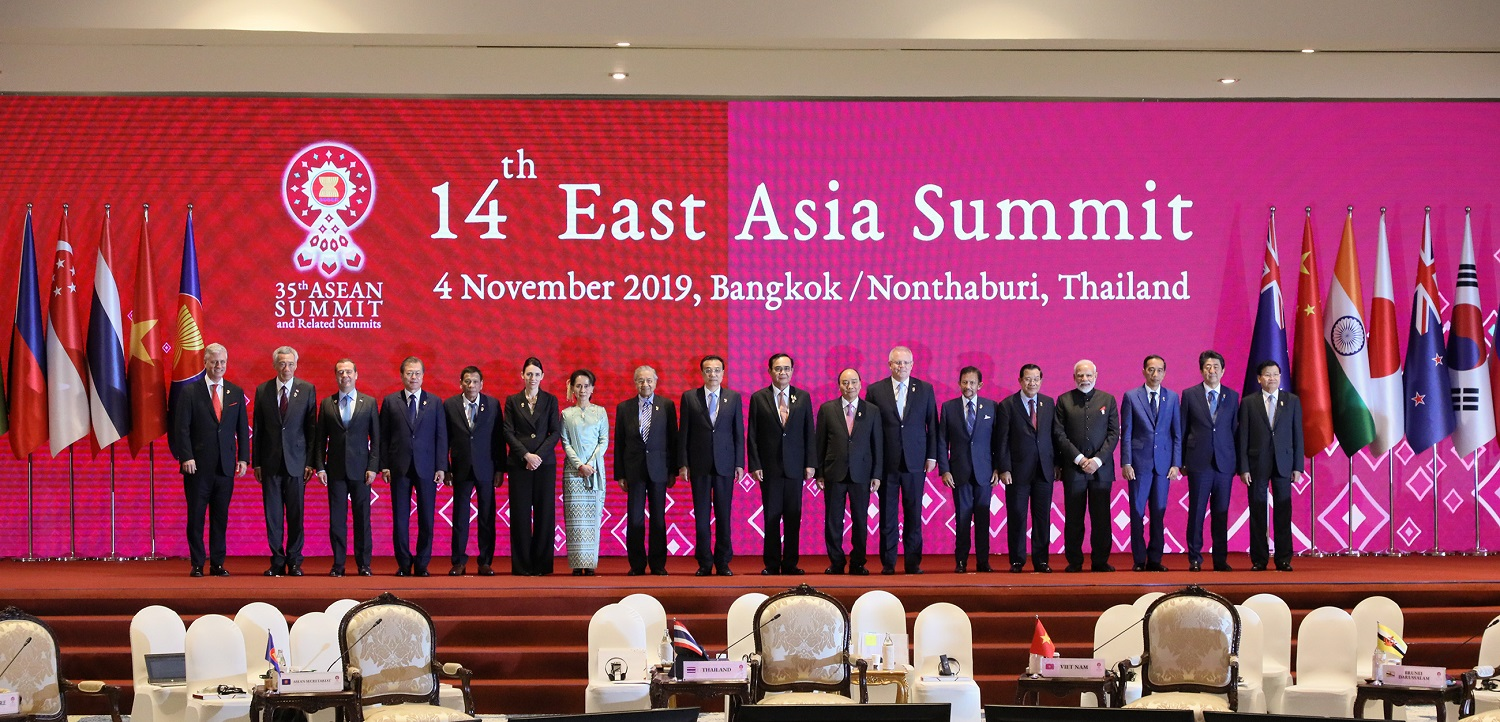
- Host country: Thailand
- Date: 4 November 2019
- Cities: Bangkok
- Participants: EAS members
- Follows: Thirteenth East Asia Summit
- Precedes: Fifteenth East Asia Summit

The Fourteenth East Asia Summit was held in Bangkok, Thailand on 4 November 2019. The East Asia Summit is an annual meeting of national leaders from the East Asian region and adjoining countries. It (EAS) has evolved as a forum for strategic dialogues and cooperation on political, security, and economic issues of common regional concern, playing an important role in the regional architecture.

== Attending delegations ==
The heads of state and heads of government of the eighteen countries participated in the summit. The host of the 2019 East Asian Summit is also the Chairperson of ASEAN, the Prime Minister of Thailand, Prayut Chan-o-cha.

The American delegation to the summit was reduced compared to previous years, with Secretary of Commerce Wilbur Ross being the most senior official in the delegation, and National Security Advisor Robert O' Brien heading the delegation.

=== Gallery ===
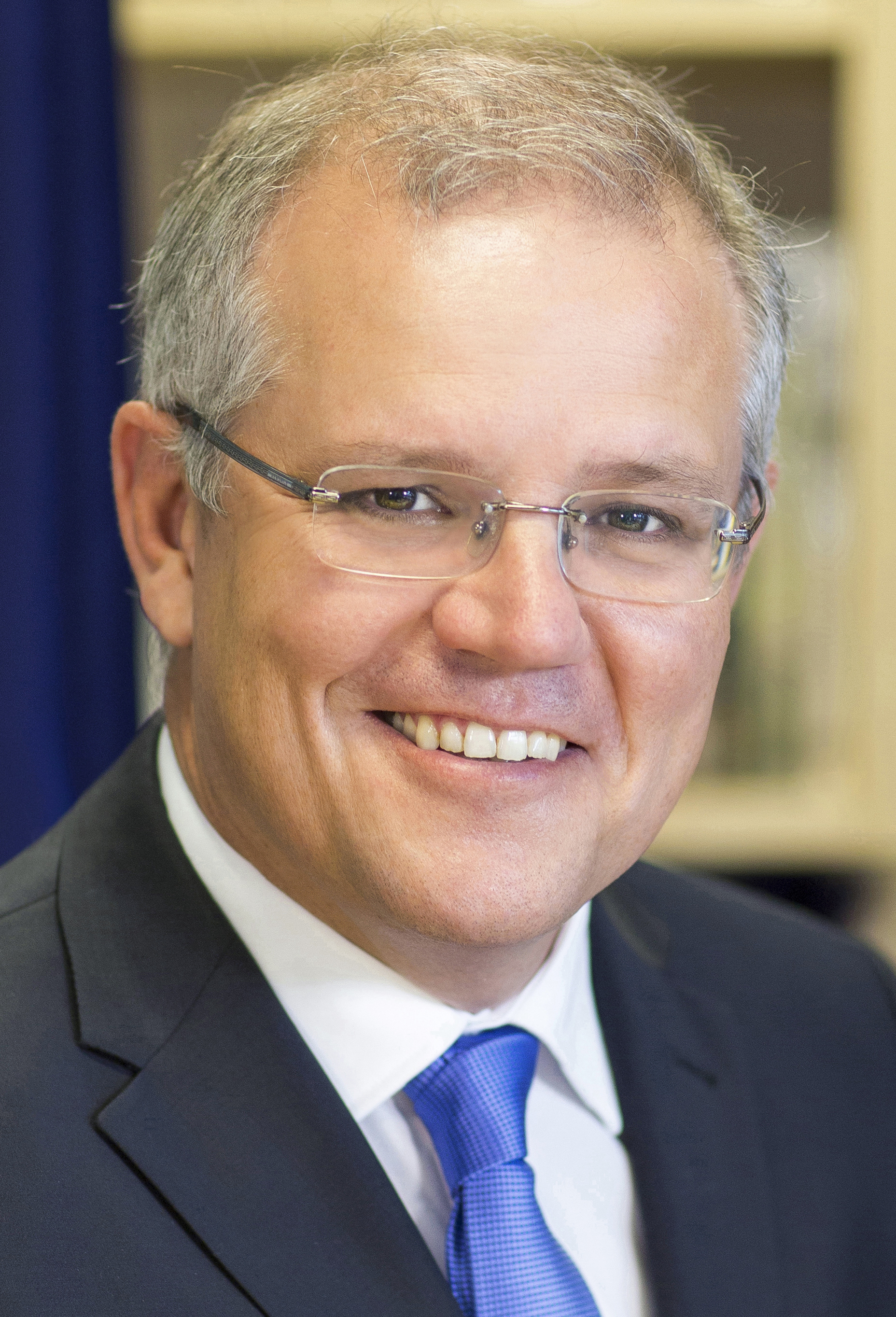
Australia
Prime Minister Scott Morrison

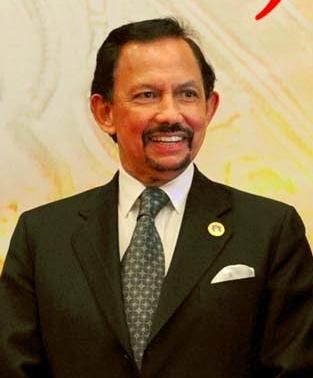
Brunei
Sultan Hassanal Bolkiah

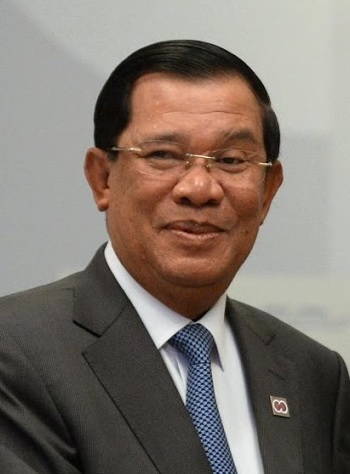
Cambodia
Prime Minister Hun Sen

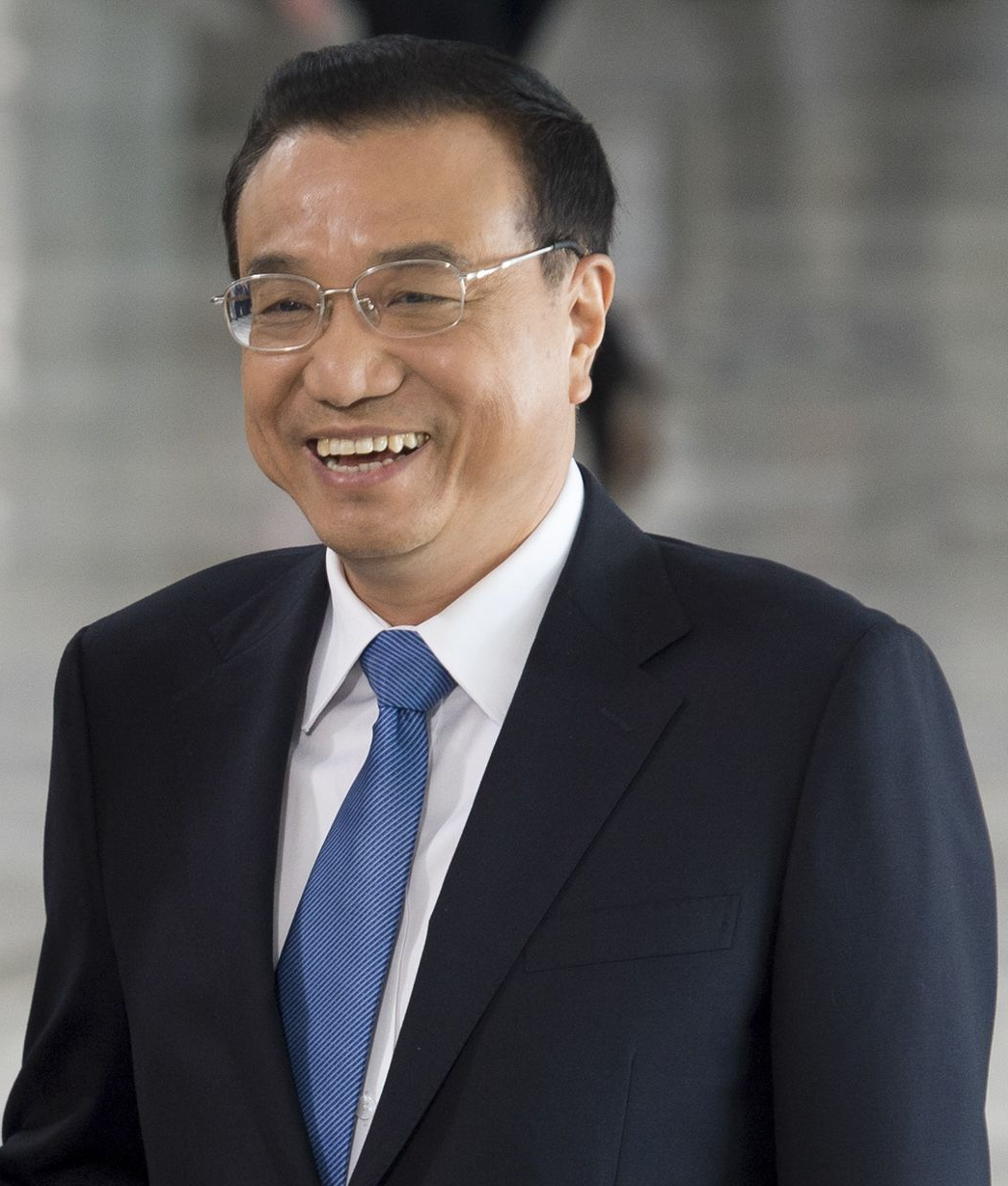
(China) China
Premier Li Keqiang

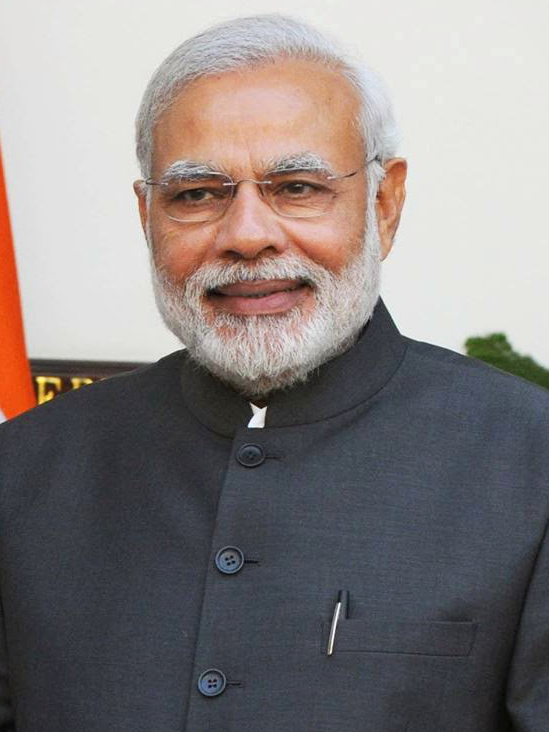
(India) India
Prime Minister Narendra Modi

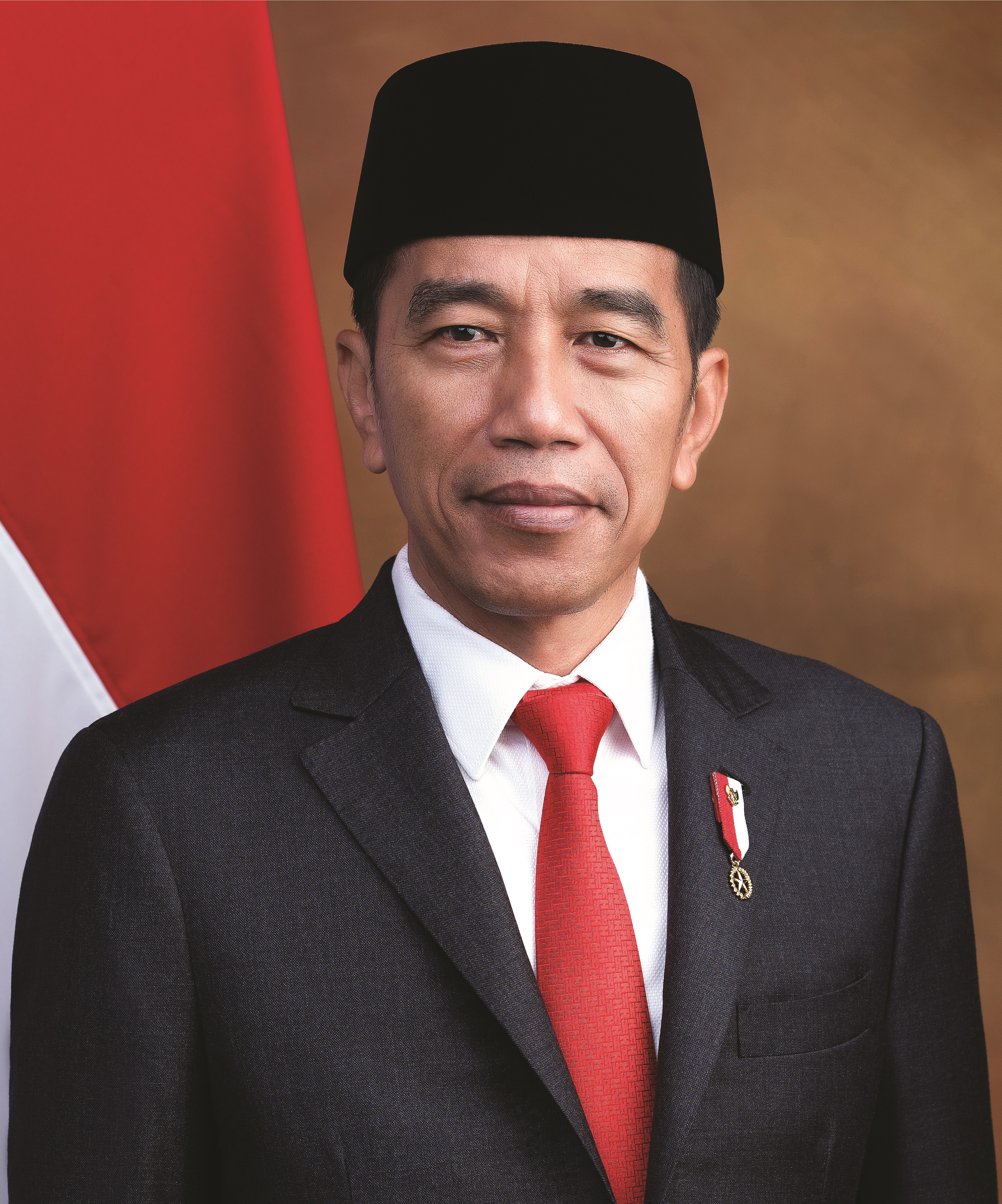
(Indonesia) Indonesia
President Joko Widodo

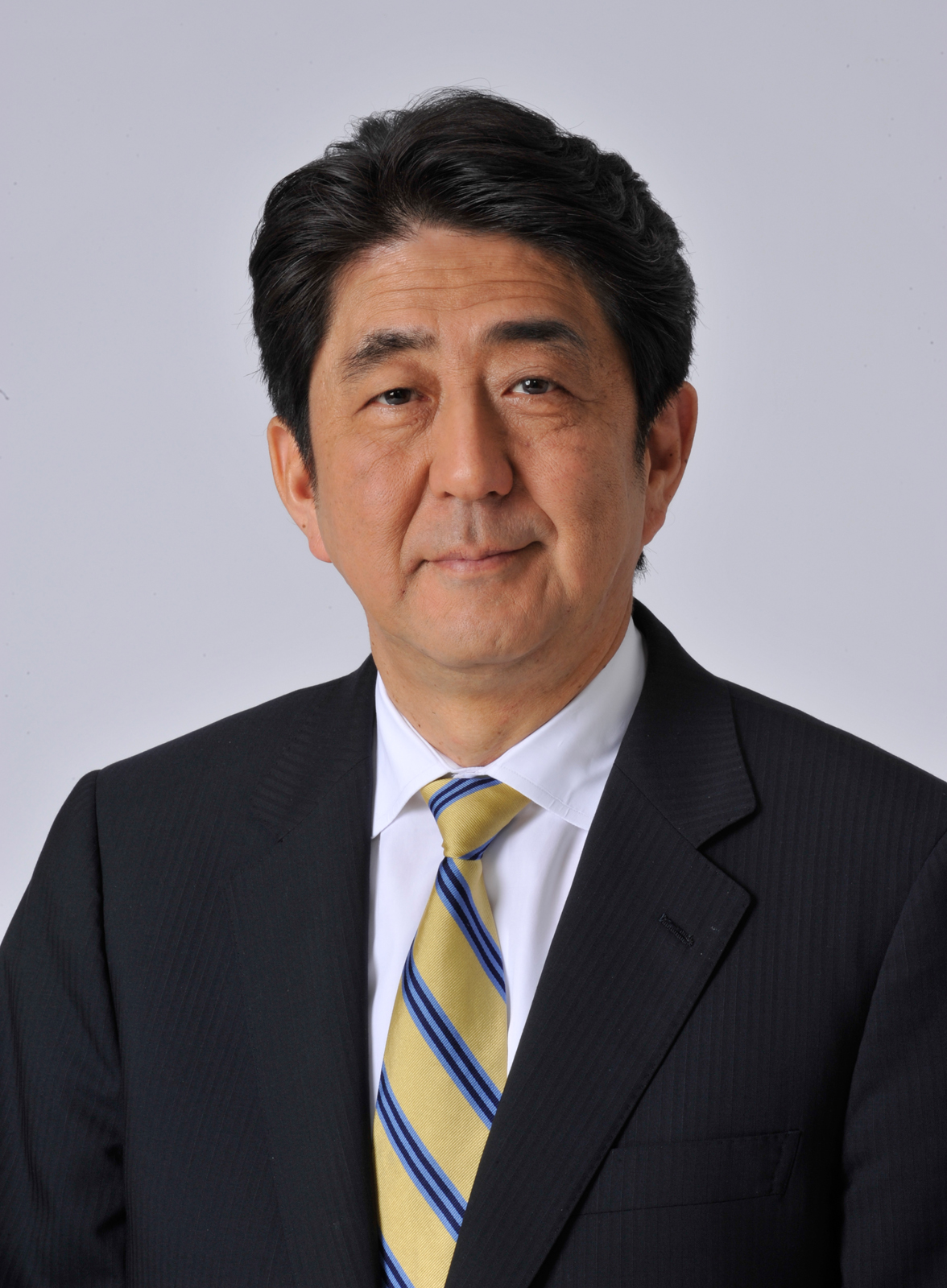
(Japan) Japan
Prime Minister Shinzō Abe

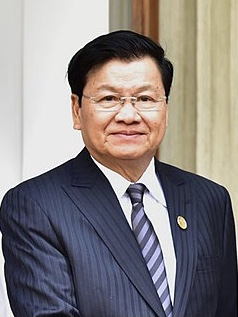
(Laos) Laos
Prime Minister Thongloun Sisoulith

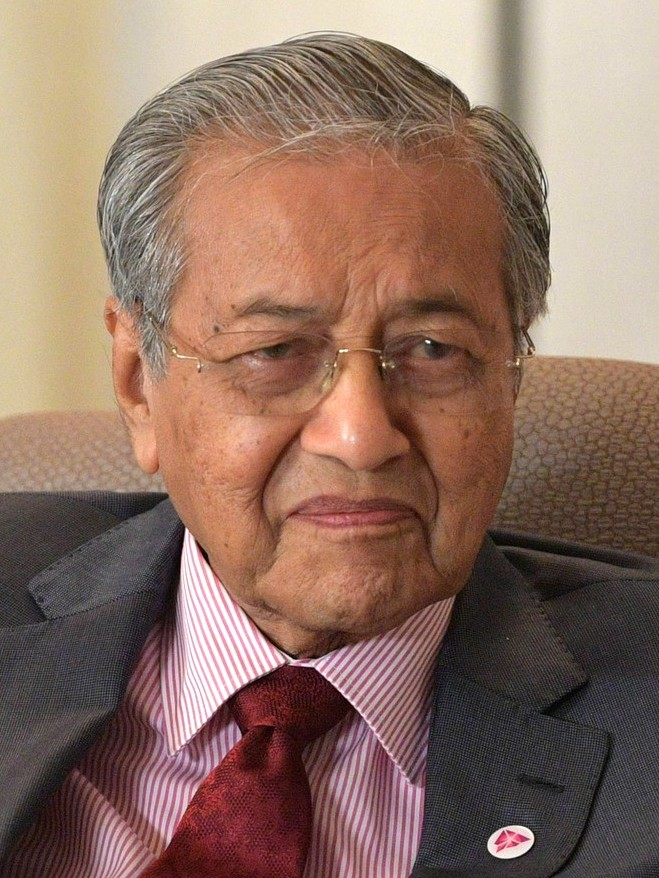
(Malaysia) Malaysia
Prime Minister Mahathir Mohamad

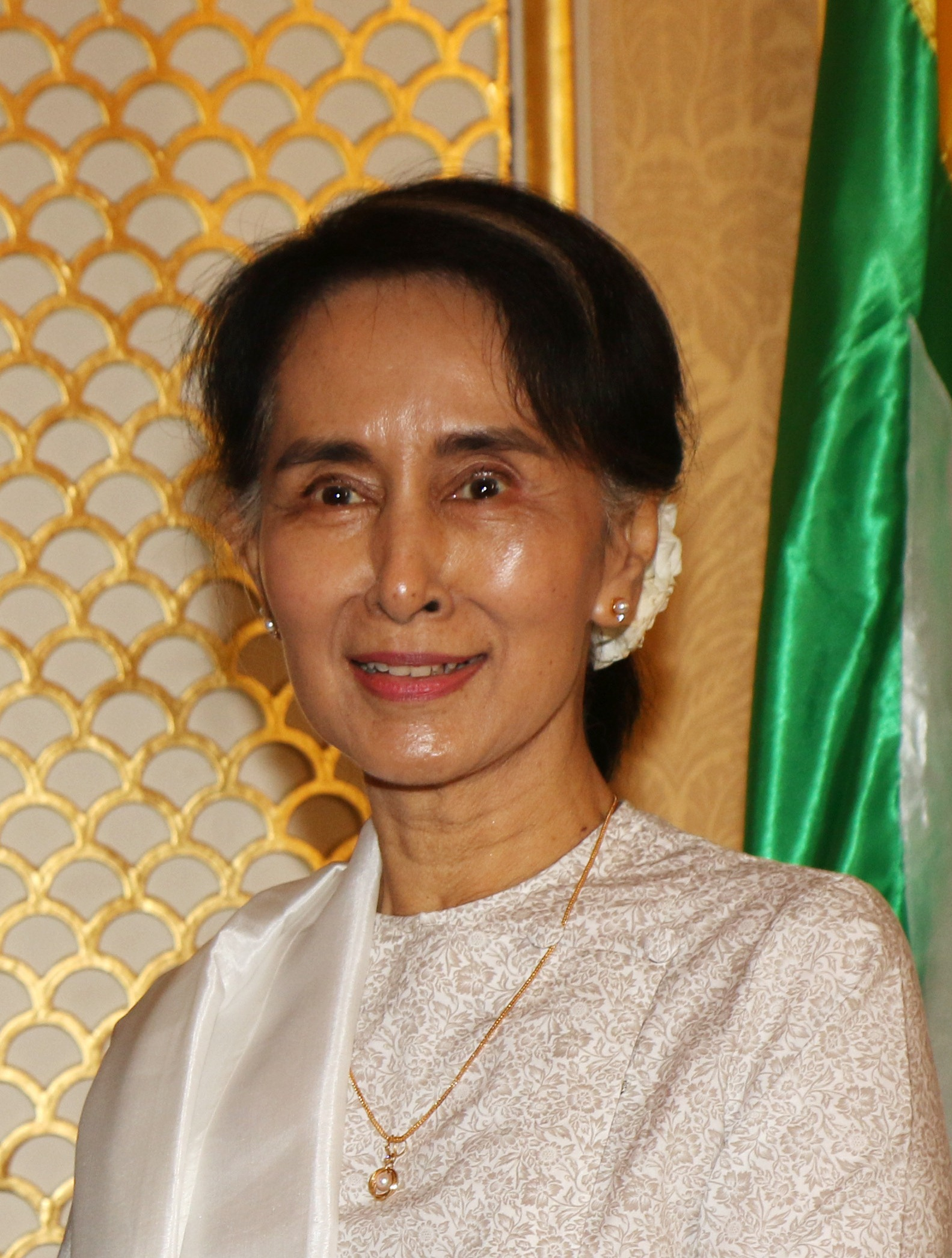
Myanmar
State Counsellor Aung San Suu Kyi

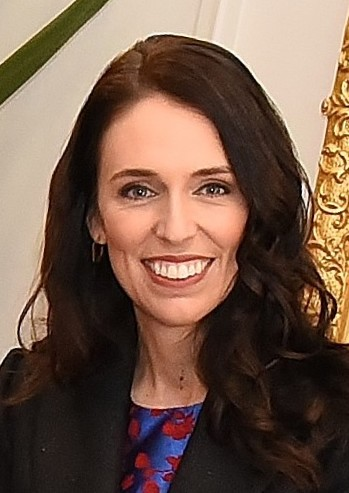
(New Zealand) New Zealand
Prime Minister Jacinda Ardern

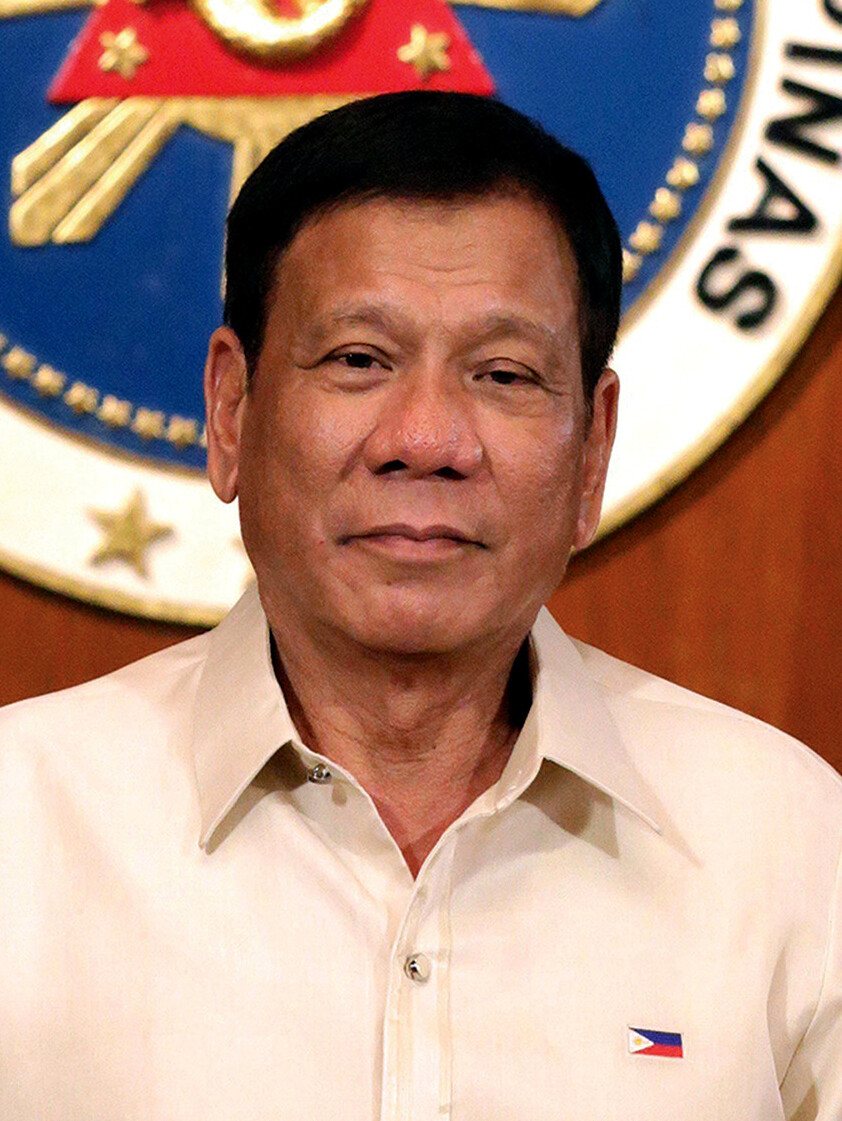
(Philippines) Philippines
President Rodrigo Duterte

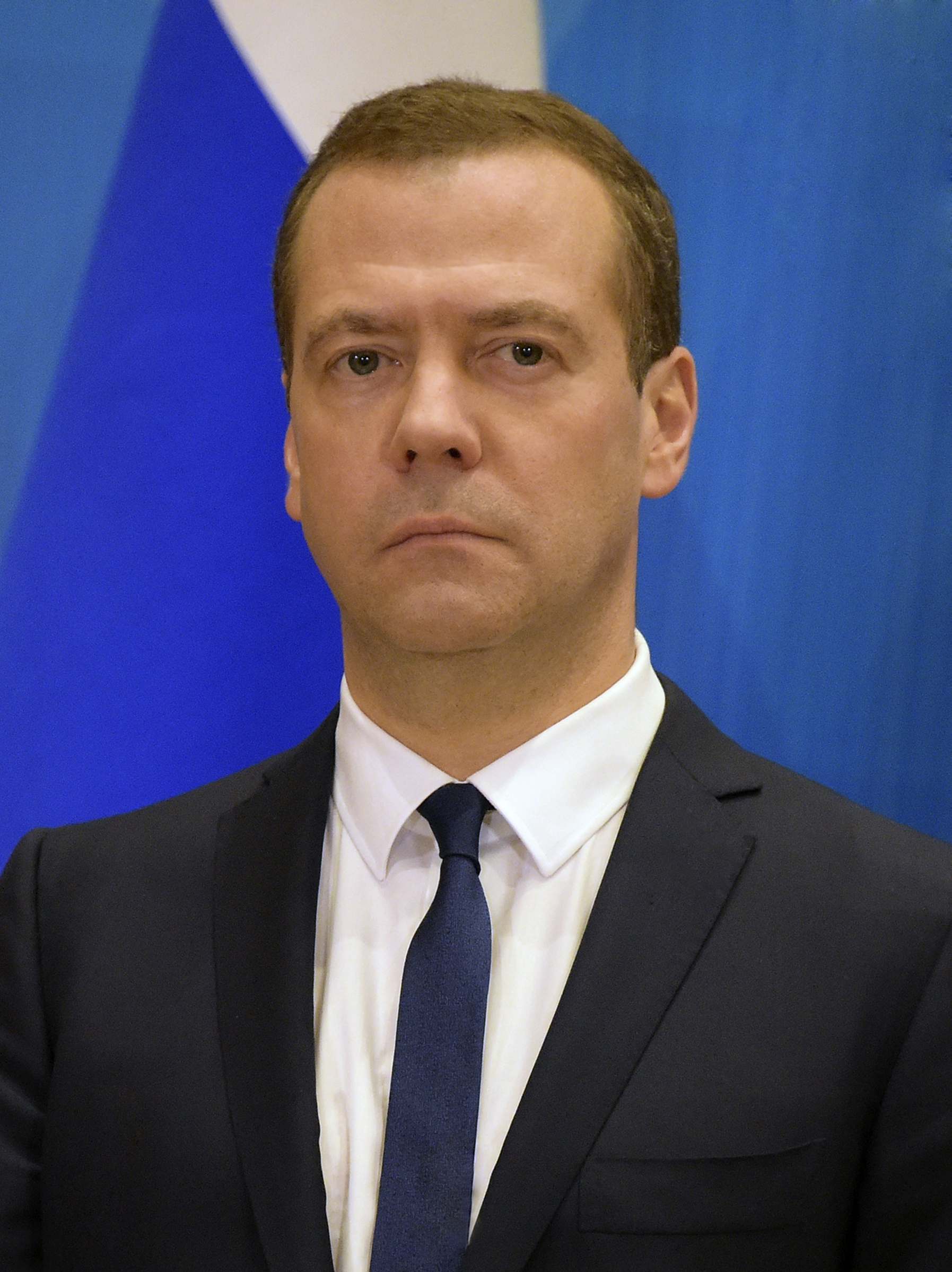
(Russia) Russia
Prime Minister Dmitry Medvedev

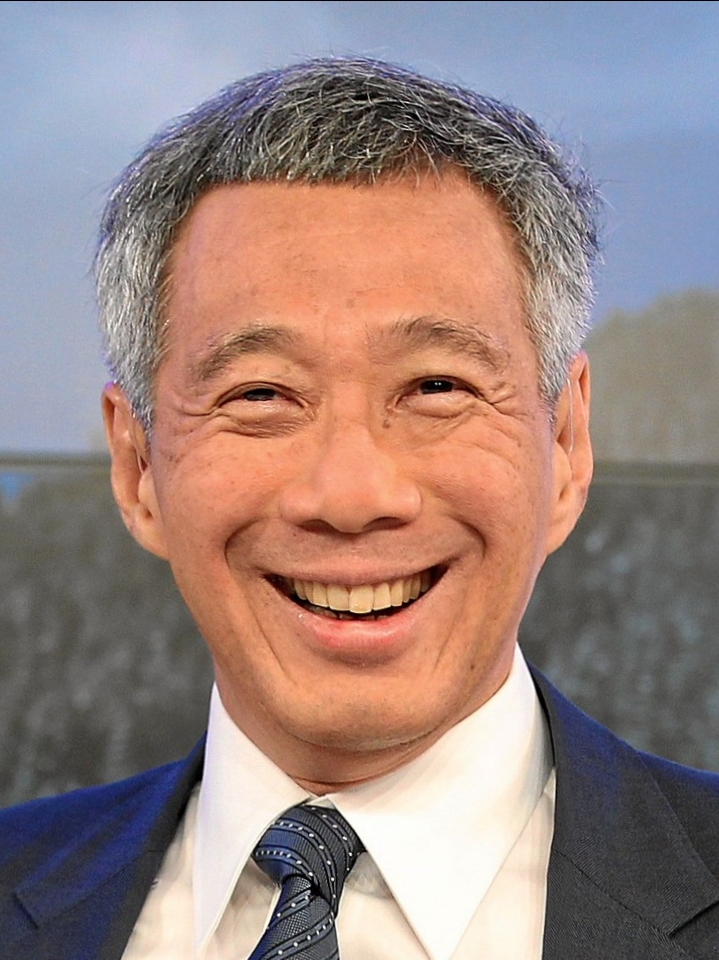
(Singapore) Singapore
Prime Minister Lee Hsien Loong

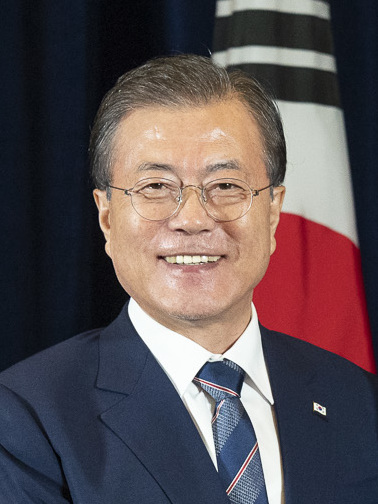
(South Korea) South Korea
President Moon Jae-in

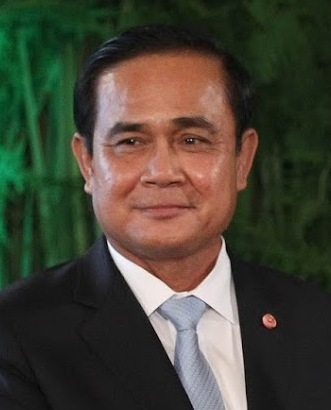
(Thailand) Thailand
Prime Minister Prayuth Chan-ocha (Chairperson)

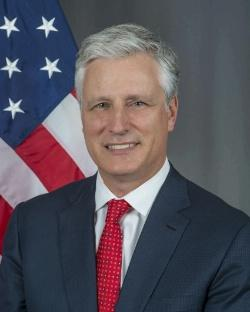
(United States) United States
National Security Advisor Robert O' Brien

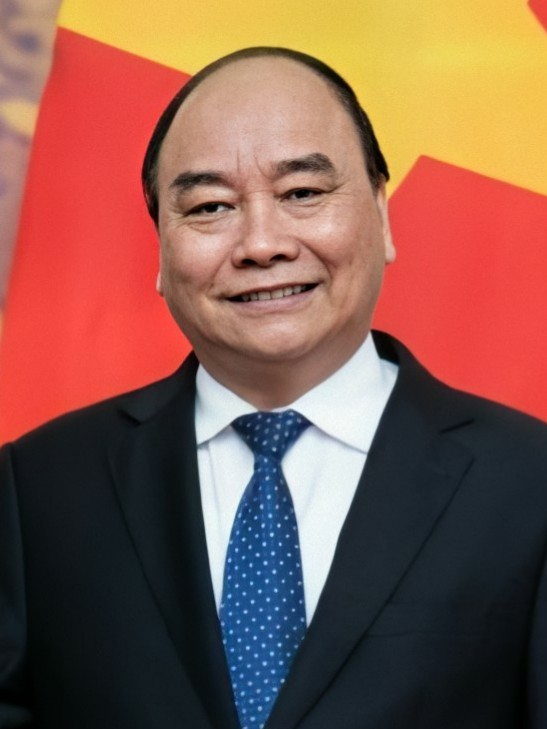
(Vietnam) Vietnam
Prime Minister Nguyễn Xuân Phúc
