= 2017 G20 Hamburg summit =

Twelfth meeting of the Group of Twenty

2017 G20 Hamburg summit 12th G20 summit
- 7–8 July 2017

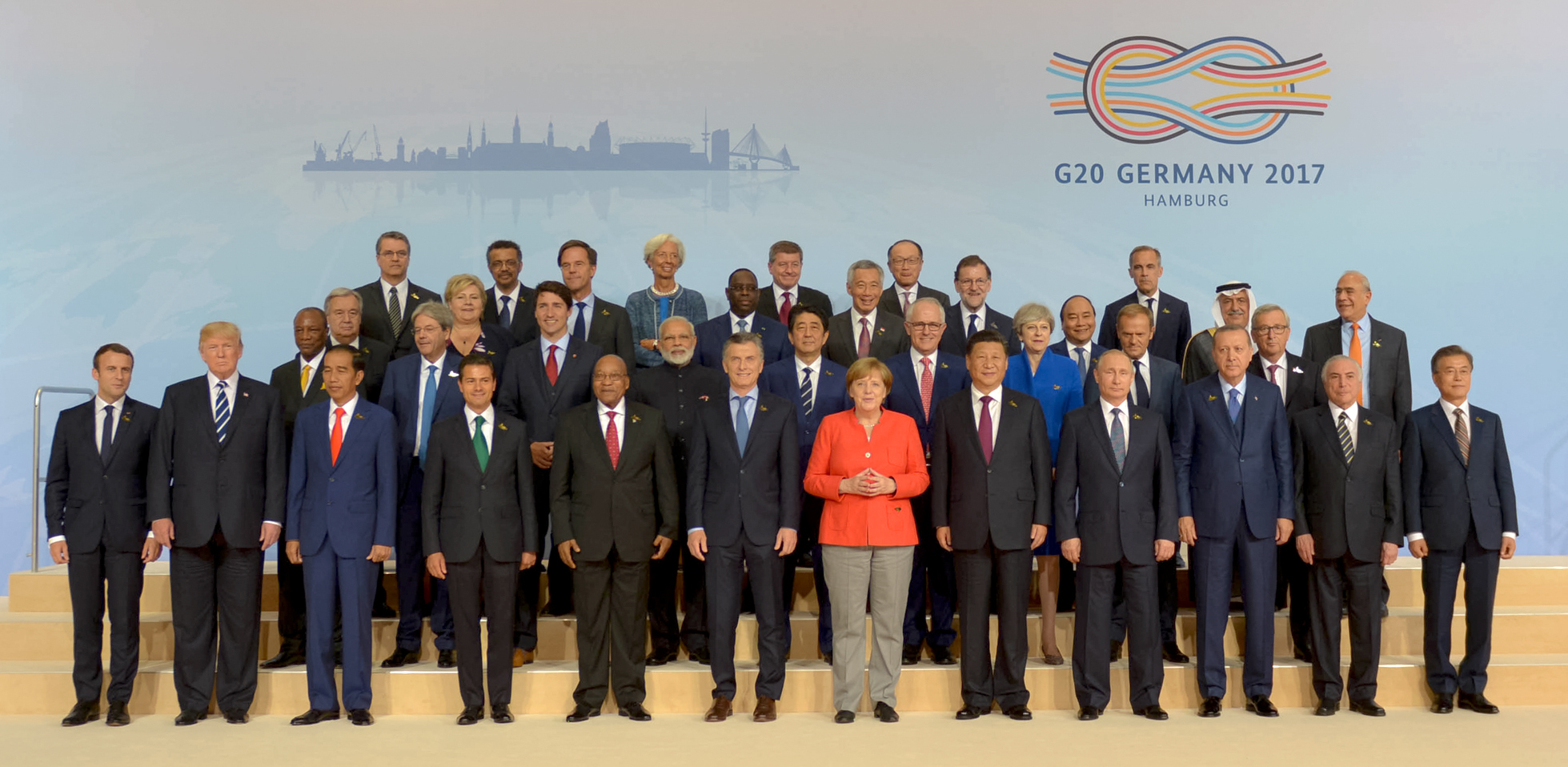
- 2017 G20 summit attendees
- Host country: Germany
- Motto: Shaping an Interconnected World
- Cities: Hamburg
- Venues: Hamburg Messe
- Participants: G20 members Guest invitees:Norway, Senegal, Singapore, Philippines and Vietnam; Invited bodies: United Nations
- Chair: Angela Merkel

The 2017 G20 Hamburg summit was the twelfth meeting of the Group of Twenty (G20), held at Hamburg Messe in the city of Hamburg. It was the first time Germany hosted the summit.

== Agenda ==
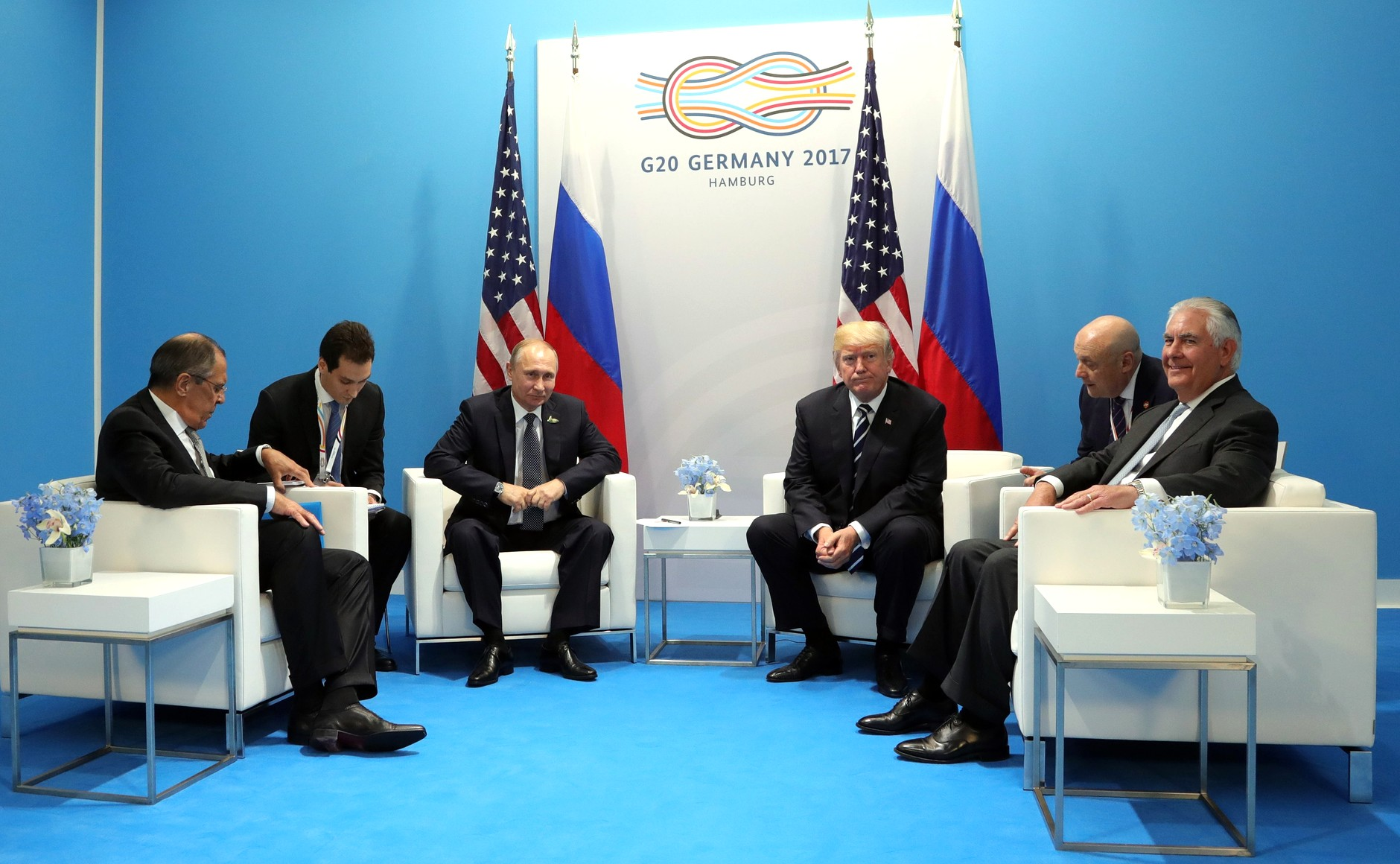
U.S. President Donald Trump, Russian President Vladimir Putin, Rex Tillerson, and Sergey Lavrov at the G20 Hamburg summit, 7 July 2017

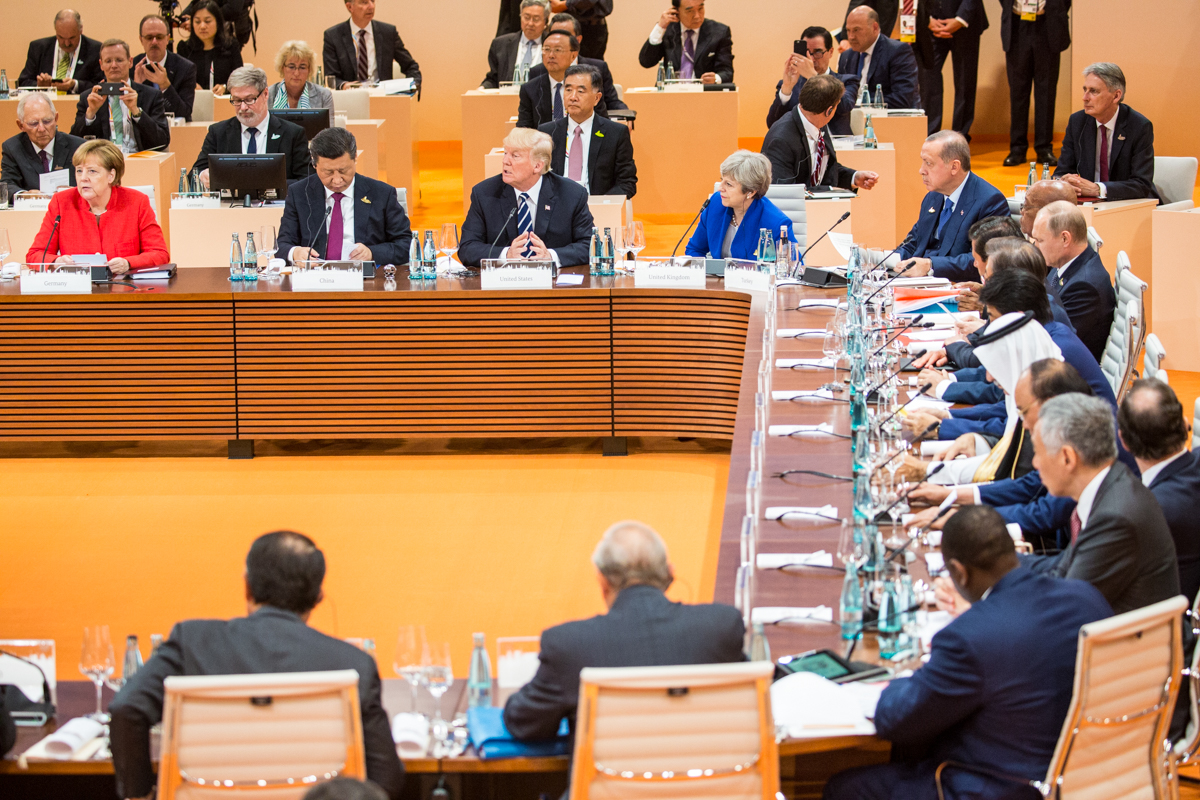
The G20 Summit working lunch, 7 July 2017

Apart from the recurring themes relating to global economic growth, international trade, and financial market regulation, the G20 Hamburg summit was expected to focus on the following "issues of global significance": Migration, digitisation, occupation, health, Women's Economic Empowerment and development aid.

On 7 July terrorism, free trade and the United States' withdrawal from the Paris Agreement were on the agenda, on 8 July Africa was supposed to be a topic.

== Results ==
The 30-page summary paper stayed vague in many sections. The communique of the 20 participants itself was seen as a success. The resolutions are not legally binding. Many additional documents were agreed upon, barely noticed by the public.(Annex in Weblink-PDF)

Wolfgang Schäuble, German Federal Minister of Finance, insisted on the interconnected nature of many issues facing G20 nations and the need to reach effective, cross-cutting policy measures: "Globalization has lifted hundreds of millions out of poverty, but there is also a growing rise in frustration in some quarters [...] development, [national] security and migration are all interlinked"

=== Trade ===
The disagreement in steel production and trade remained. Donald Trump accused steel producers in China and Europe of dumping and threatened them with antidumping duty. The G20 demanded a report of overcapacities by November 2017.

=== Sustainable development ===
There was no consensus with the USA regarding climate protection: a dissent with communalities in the deployment of renewable energy was formulated. The other 19 participants agreed to stick with the Paris agreement, to view it as irreversible and to swiftly put it into practice. After the summit finished, the Turkish president, Erdoğan said his country would not ratify the Paris agreement; Turkey was no industrialized nation but a developing country like other neighboring countries of the region and that François Hollande as then President had assured international assistance funds. President Macron has now invited members for further negotiations at another climate summit in Paris on 12 December. In spite of the United States' dissent, the German presidency wanted to make the most of the "renewed public policy interest for environmental sustainability, gender equity and social inclusiveness, in the spirit of the UN's Sustainable Development Goals (SDGs)" – notably by promoting renewable energy and further fossil fuel divestment in all nations.

=== More inclusive growth ===
The G20 final communique placed a new emphasis on the need for trade deals to be reciprocal and non-discriminatory towards developing countries, reducing the previous emphasis on the primacy of liberalization and the promotion of free market economics across the board.

==== Indian-Norwegian cooperation ====
India's Prime Minister Narendra Modi invited Norwegian pension funds to invest in his country's National Infrastructure Investment platform as he met Norway's Prime Minister Erna Solberg, who, in a gesture symbolising renewed cooperation towards the attainment of the Sustainable Development Goals, offered him a round leather football embroidered with the initials 'SDGs'

==== Women's Economic Empowerment ====
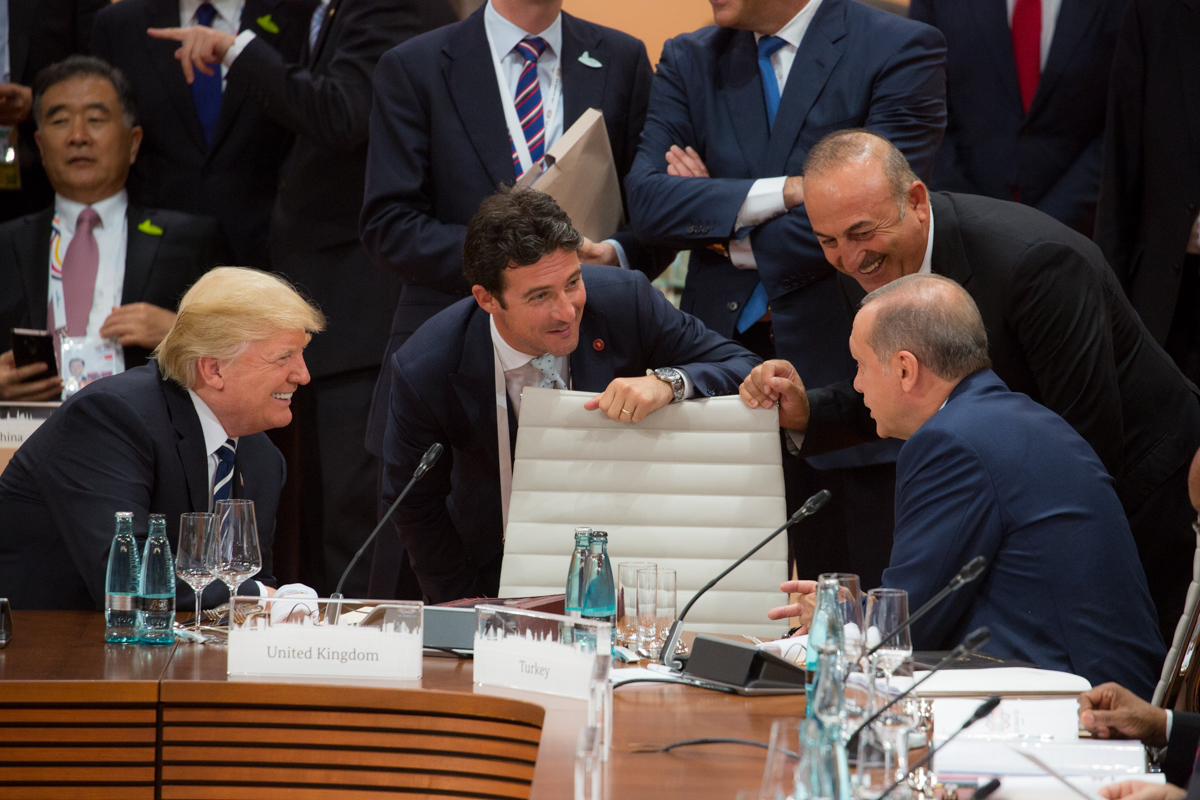
Donald Trump and Turkish President Recep Tayyip Erdoğan

The World Bank Group and the White House, represented by First Daughter Ivanka Trump, confirmed they would soon roll out a new fund that aims to help female entrepreneurs access capital, financing and managerial support in the developing world. World Bank Group President Jim Yong Kim said the Women Entrepreneurs Finance Initiative fund had so far raised $325 million from various governments, and that he hoped to leverage that into a multibillion-dollar investment framework. President Trump lent his personal support by pledging $50 million from the United States to jump-start the fund: "by investing in women around the world, we're investing in families, we're investing in prosperity and we're investing in peace".

Moroccan businesswoman Miriem Bensalah-Chaqroun was invited by Jim Yong Kim to help launch the Women's Entrepreneur Finance Initiative.

=== Refugee crisis and migration ===
International migration effectively entered the G20 agenda only in 2015 when the final leader's declaration of the Antalya Summit described the "ongoing refugee crisis" as a global concern. Nearly one year later at the Hangzhou Summit in September 2016, G20 leaders reiterated their call for more burden sharing, humanitarian assistance and development funding. They also agreed to "address forced displacement in 2017 with a view to developing concrete actions" and to examine migration issues. However, although the Hamburg Declaration in July 2017 mentions both migration and forced displacement in general terms, it does not propose any "concrete actions" in either area.

=== Counter-terrorism and national security ===
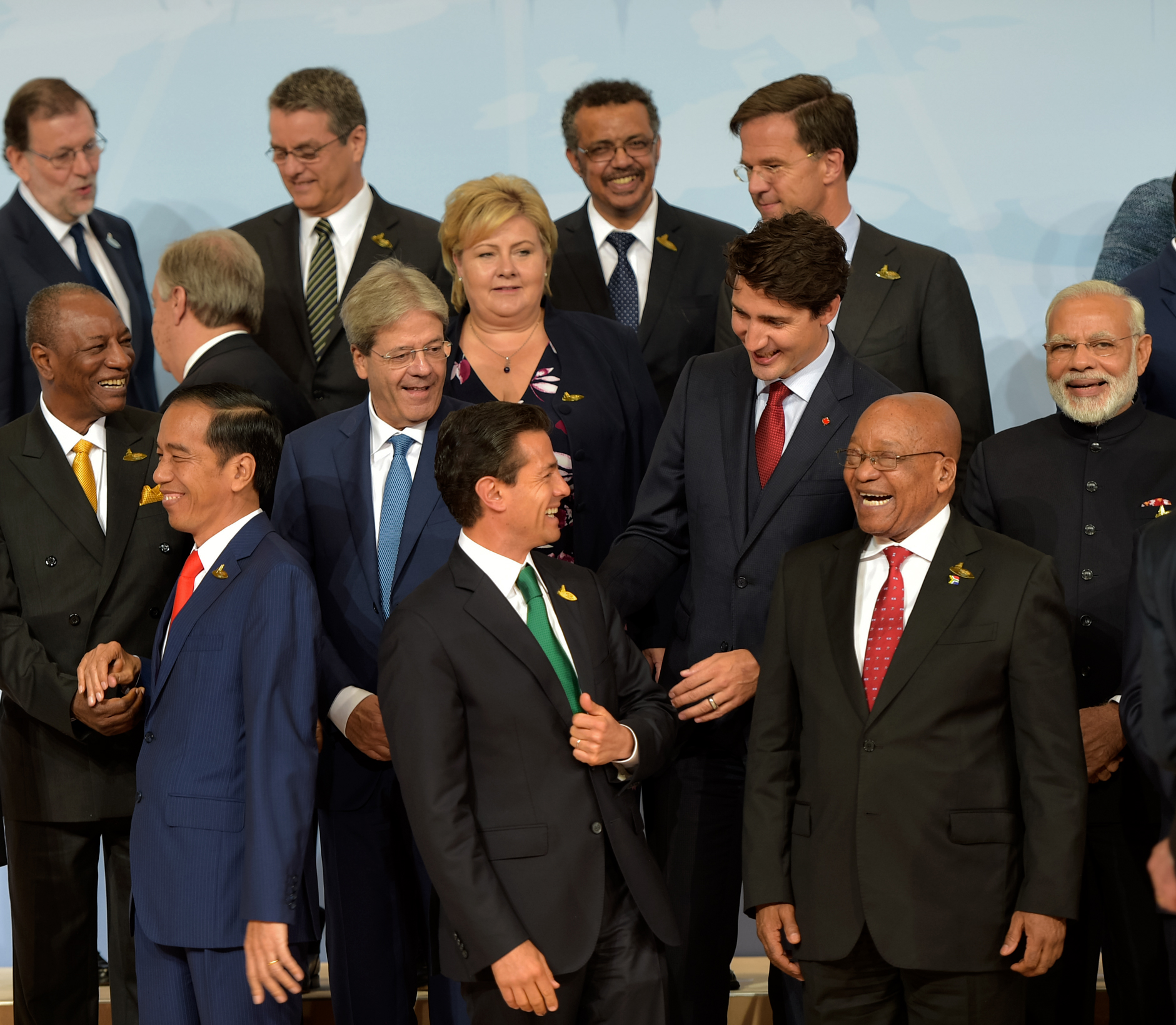
Leaders having chat at the photo-session

All agreed to continue regulating financial markets and to combat financing terrorism and tax evasion. Trade was intensely discussed and participants agreed to keep markets open and combat protectionism and unfair trade practises. The USA took a special stand as Trump supports protectionism. Participants agreed to a G20-Africa-Partnership and passed a special paper about the relationships to the African nations. In a joint statement, G20 leaders vowed to take steps to prevent the internet from being used to spread propaganda. Modi indirectly targeted Pakistan (which is not a member of G20) by naming terrorist organisations that operate from its soil and saying that the groups all share the same ideology and purpose – of spreading hate and killing people. Indonesian President Joko Widodo urged member states to unite to fight against terrorism and emphasized on preventive as well as de-radicalization programs.

Trump and Putin "discussed forming an impenetrable cybersecurity unit so that election hacking, and many other negative things, will be guarded and safe". Trump later said he does not think this will happen.

Trump and Putin reached a partial ceasefire agreement in Southwest Syria, starting Sunday, 10 July 12 o'clock local time the representatives of the two nuclear powers talked with each other. German Chancellor Angela Merkel told reporters at her closing press conference of the G20 summit: "I was delighted that it was on the margins of G20 that the first meeting between Trump and Putin took place. It's always better to talk one to the other, not one about the other. I was gratified to hear that they talked at a great length." The two had met in person there for the first time.

== Participating leaders ==
List of leaders who took part in the 2017 G20 Hamburg summit:

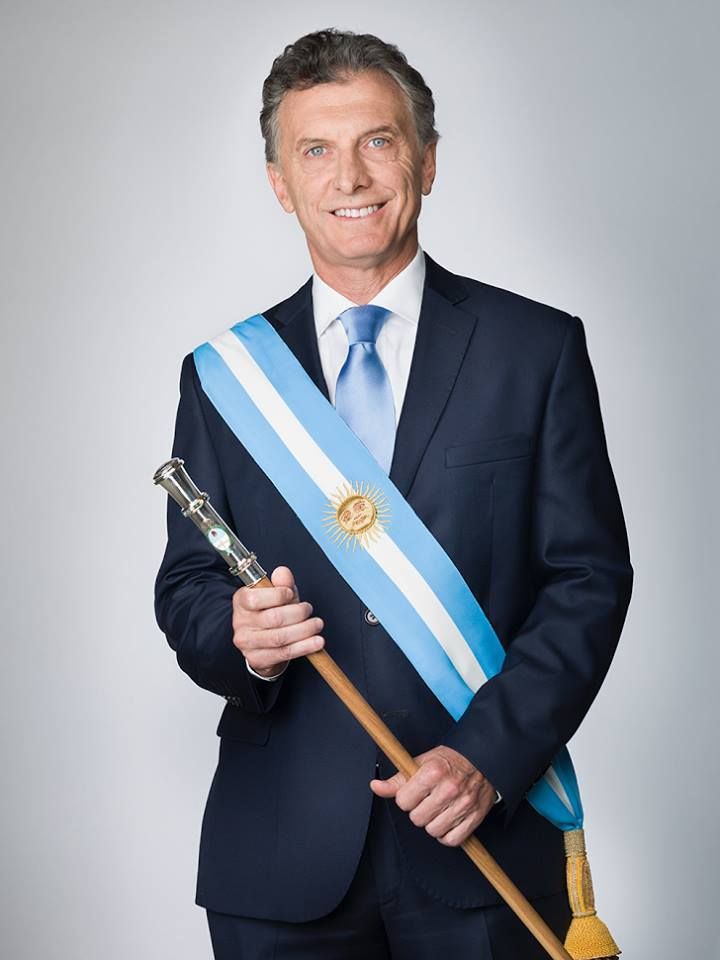
Argentina
Mauricio Macri, President

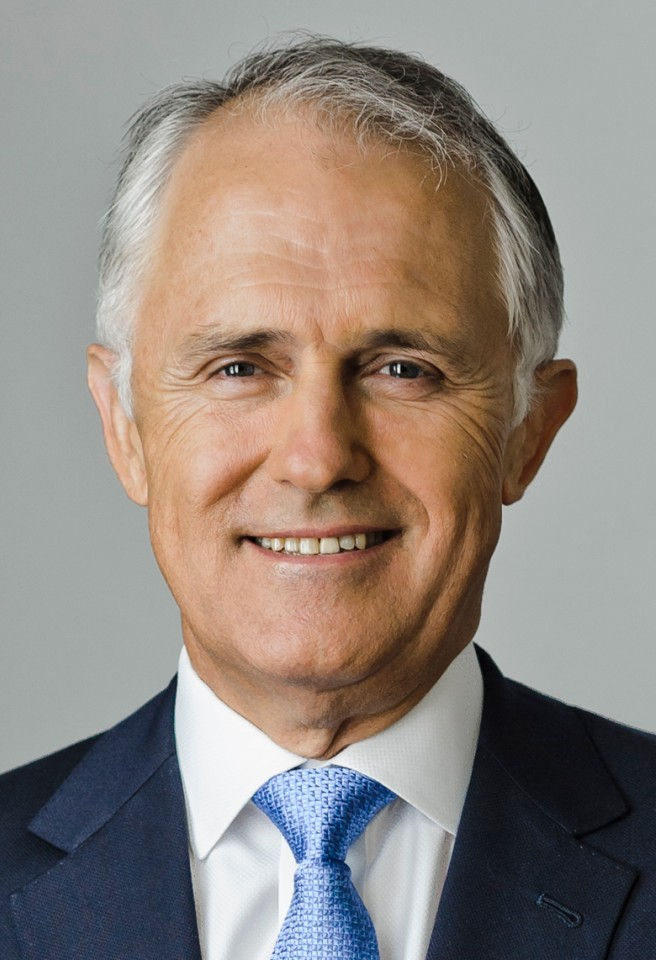
Australia
Malcolm Turnbull, Prime Minister

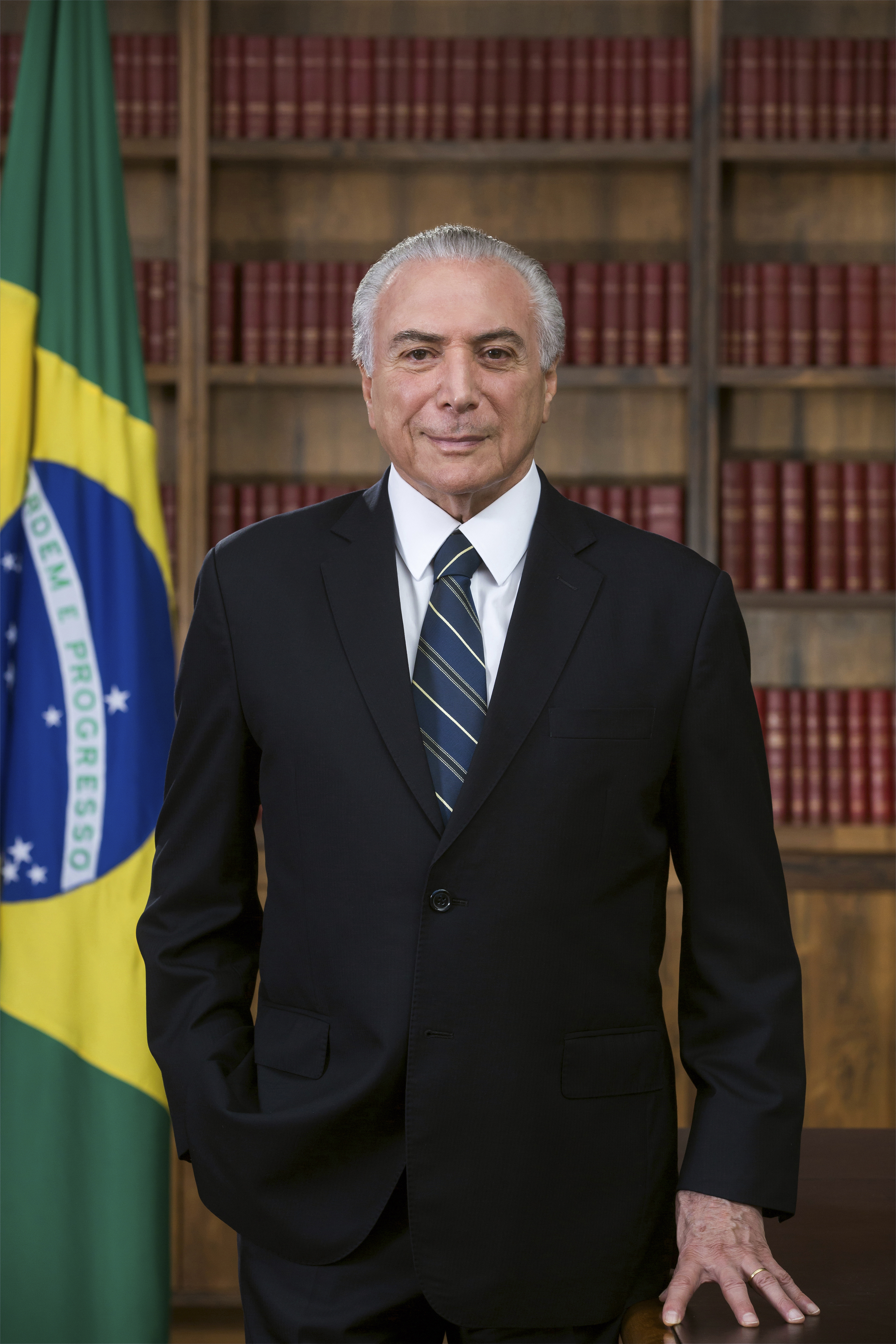
Brazil
Michel Temer, President

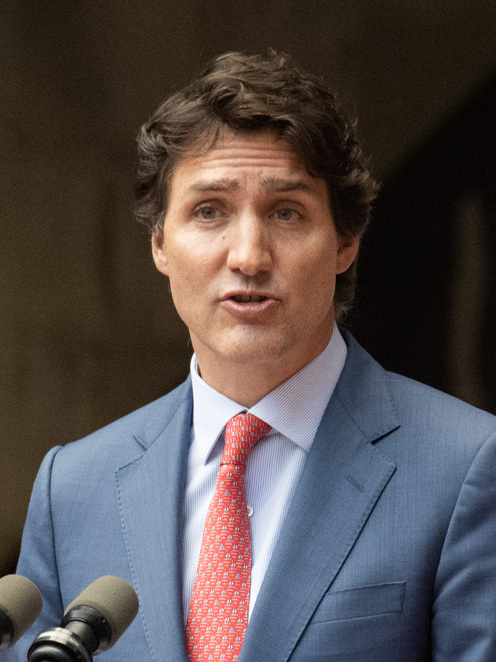
Canada
Justin Trudeau, Prime Minister

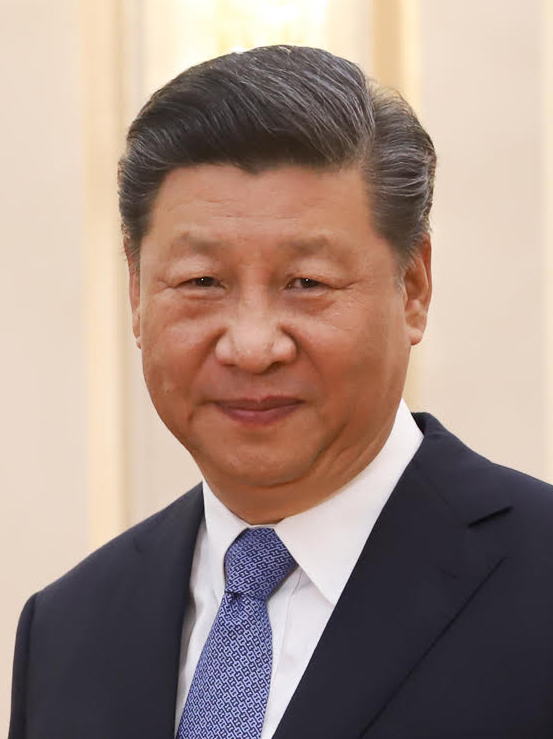
China
Xi Jinping, President

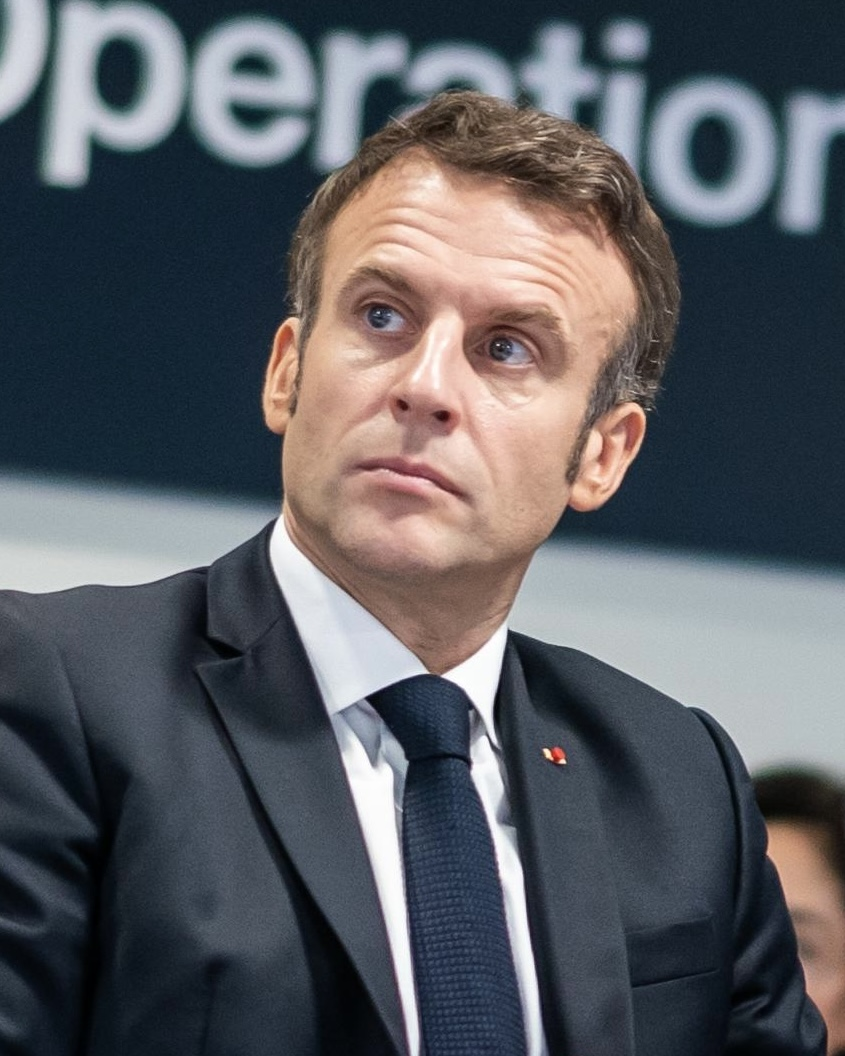
(France) France
Emmanuel Macron, President

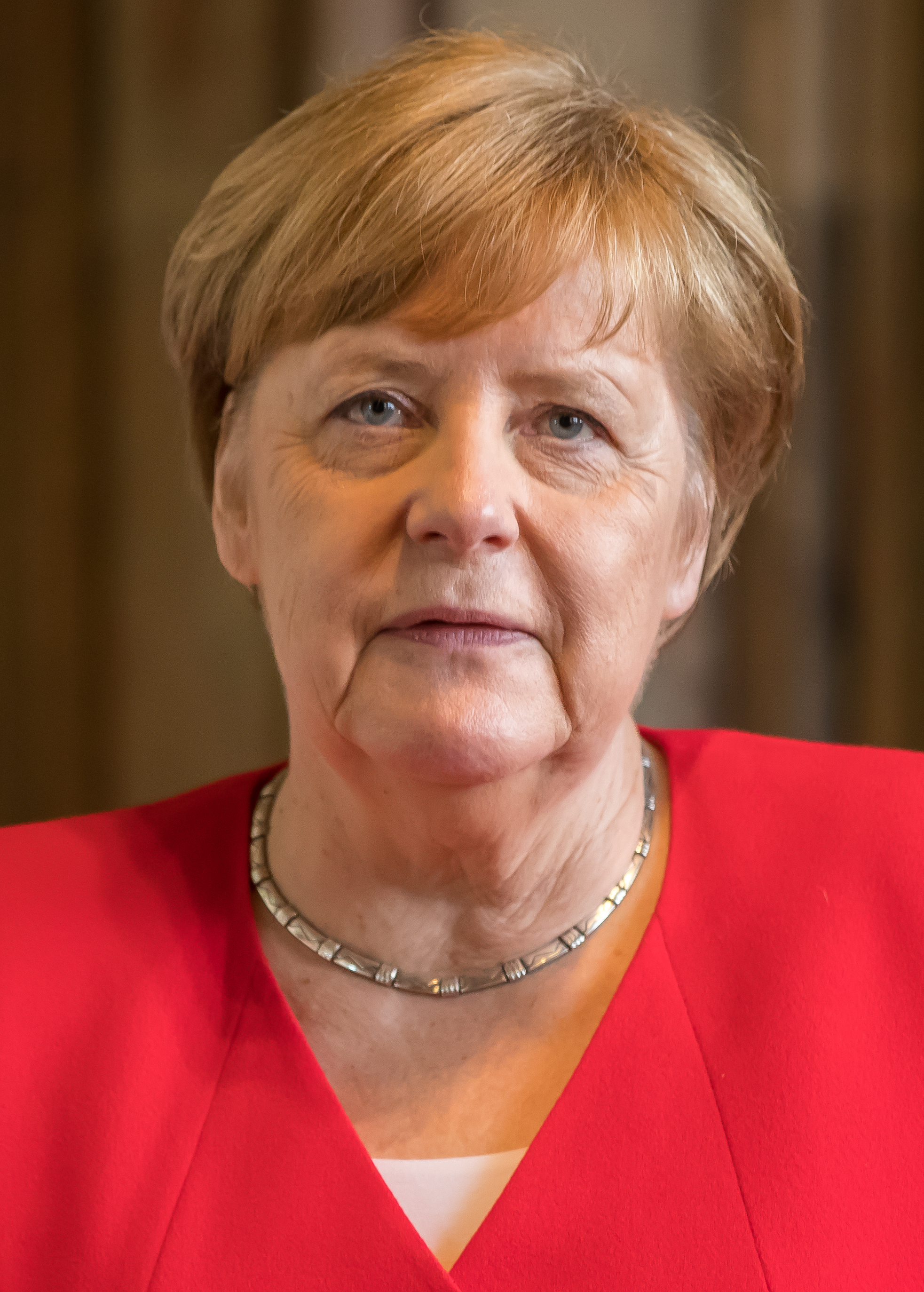
Germany
Angela Merkel, Chancellor (Hostess)

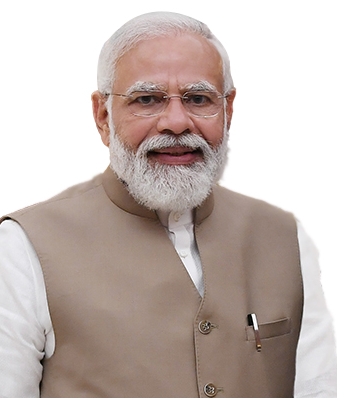
India
Narendra Modi, Prime Minister

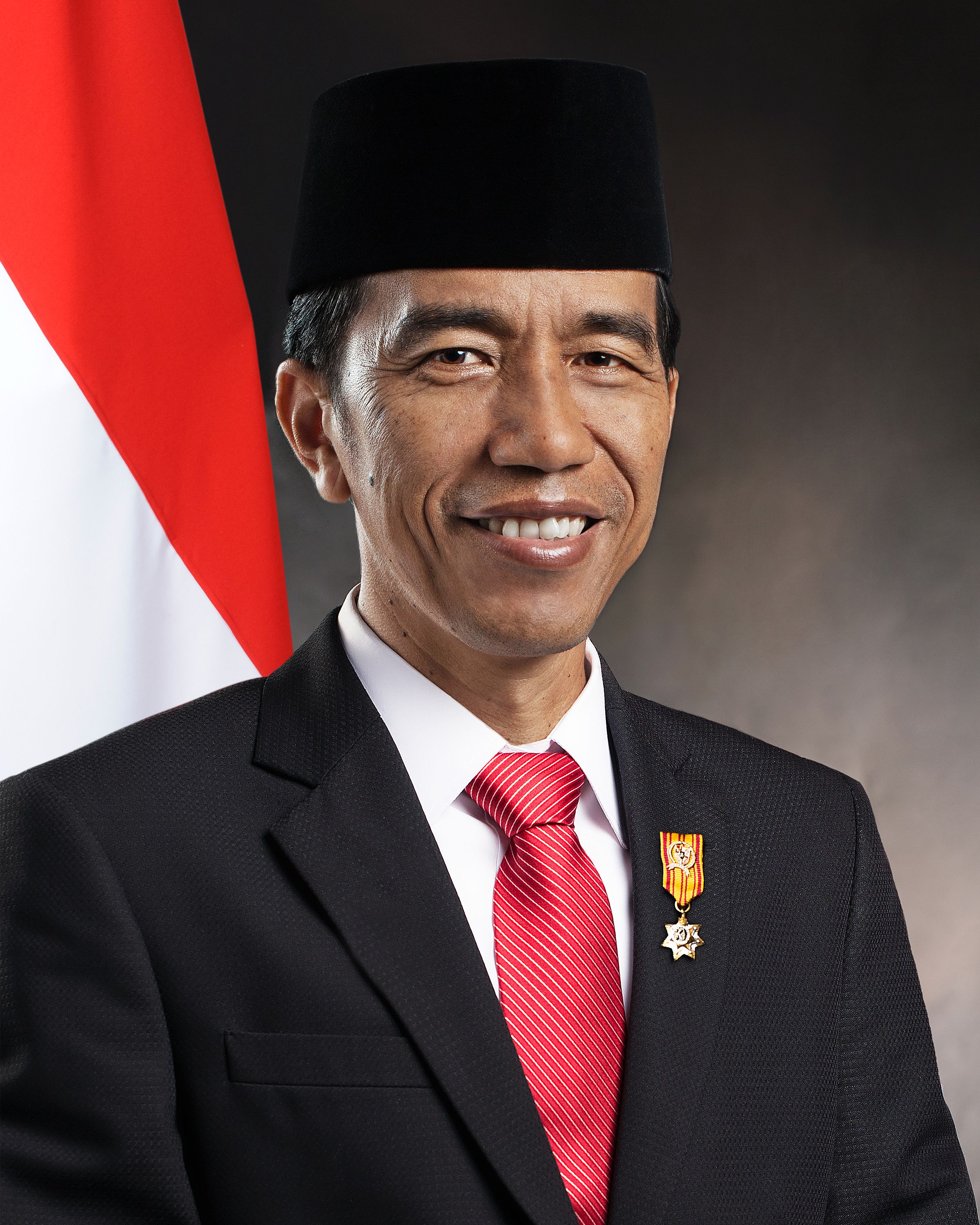
Indonesia
Joko Widodo, President

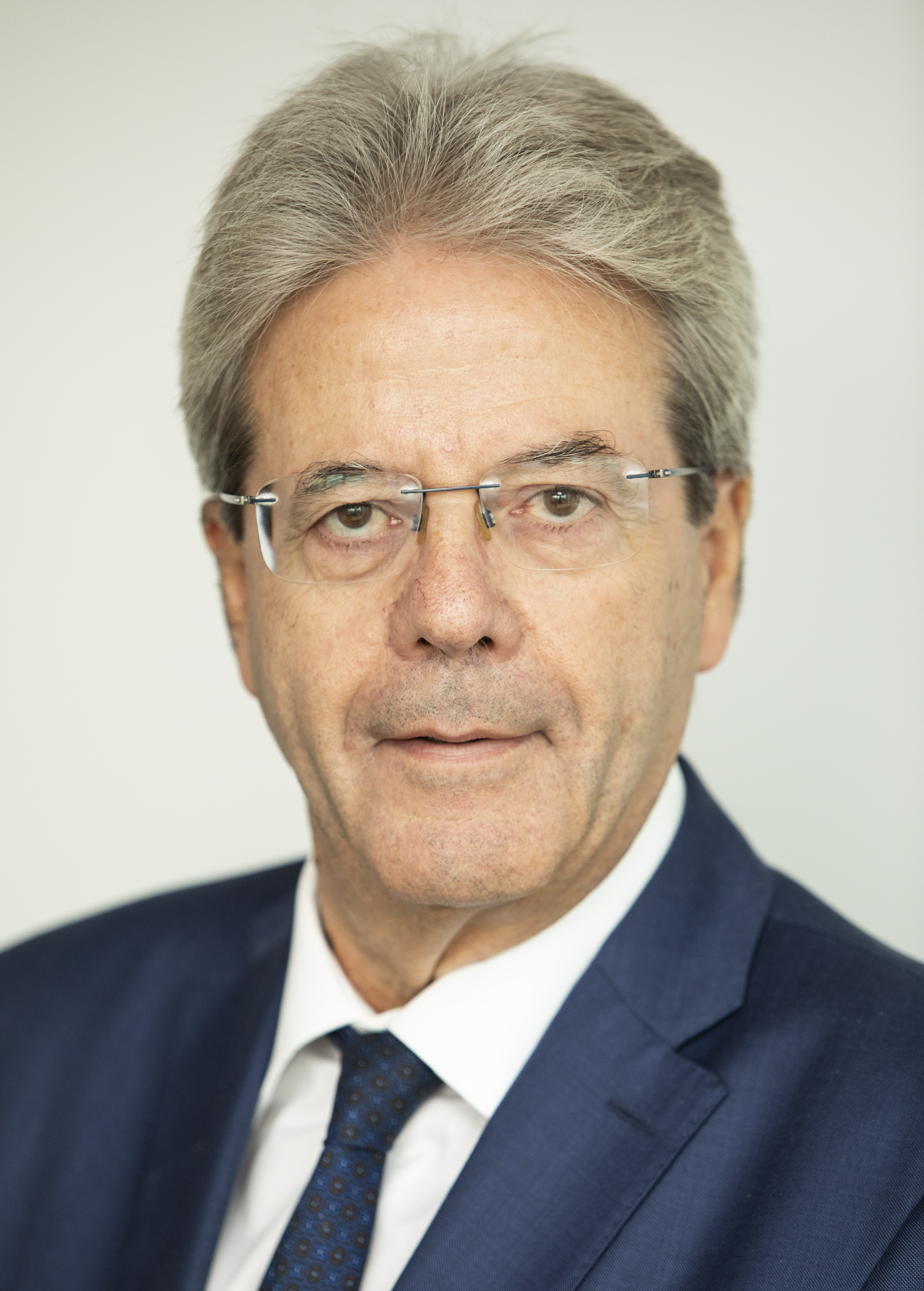
Italy
Paolo Gentiloni, Prime Minister

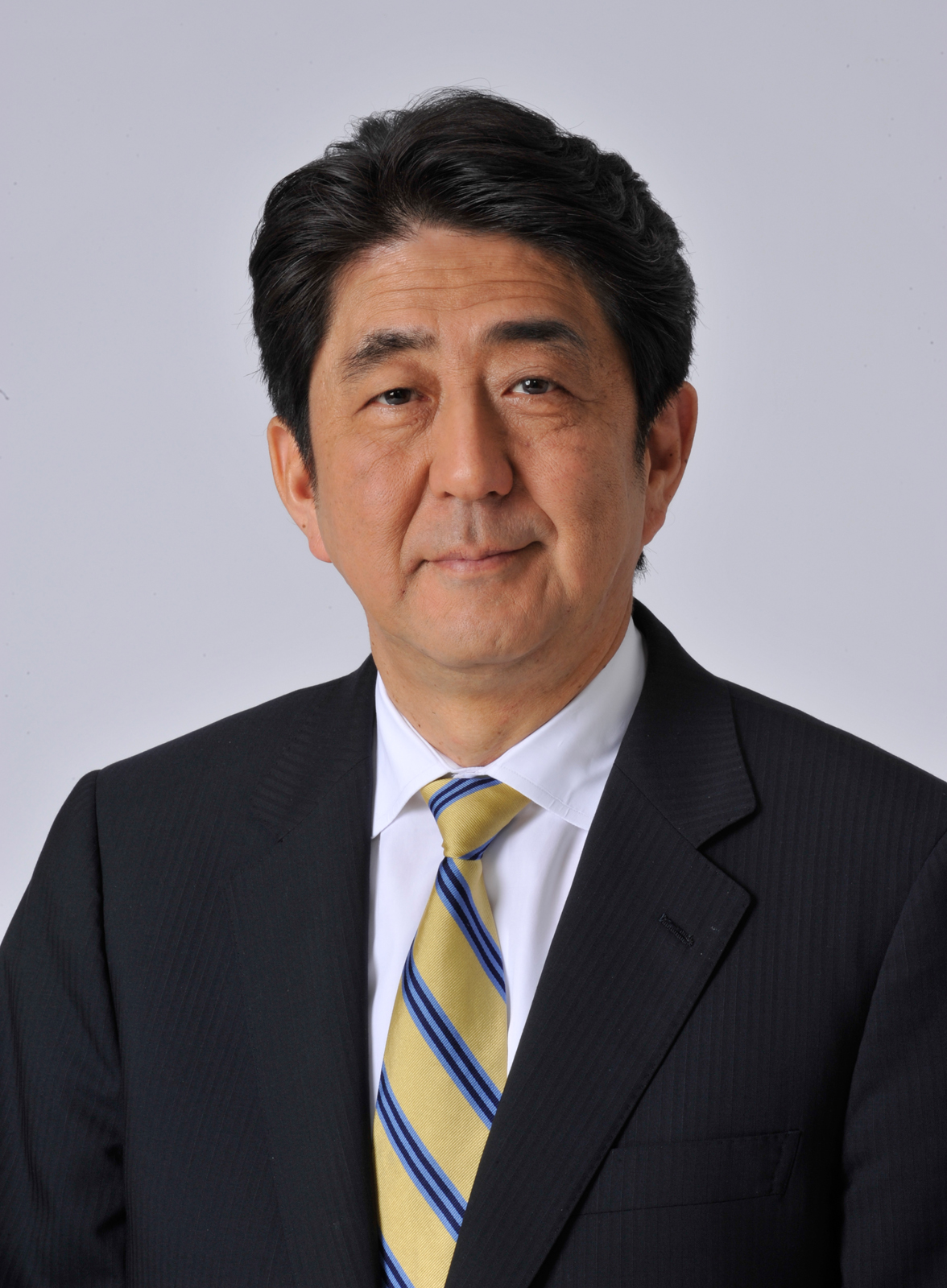
Japan
Shinzō Abe, Prime Minister

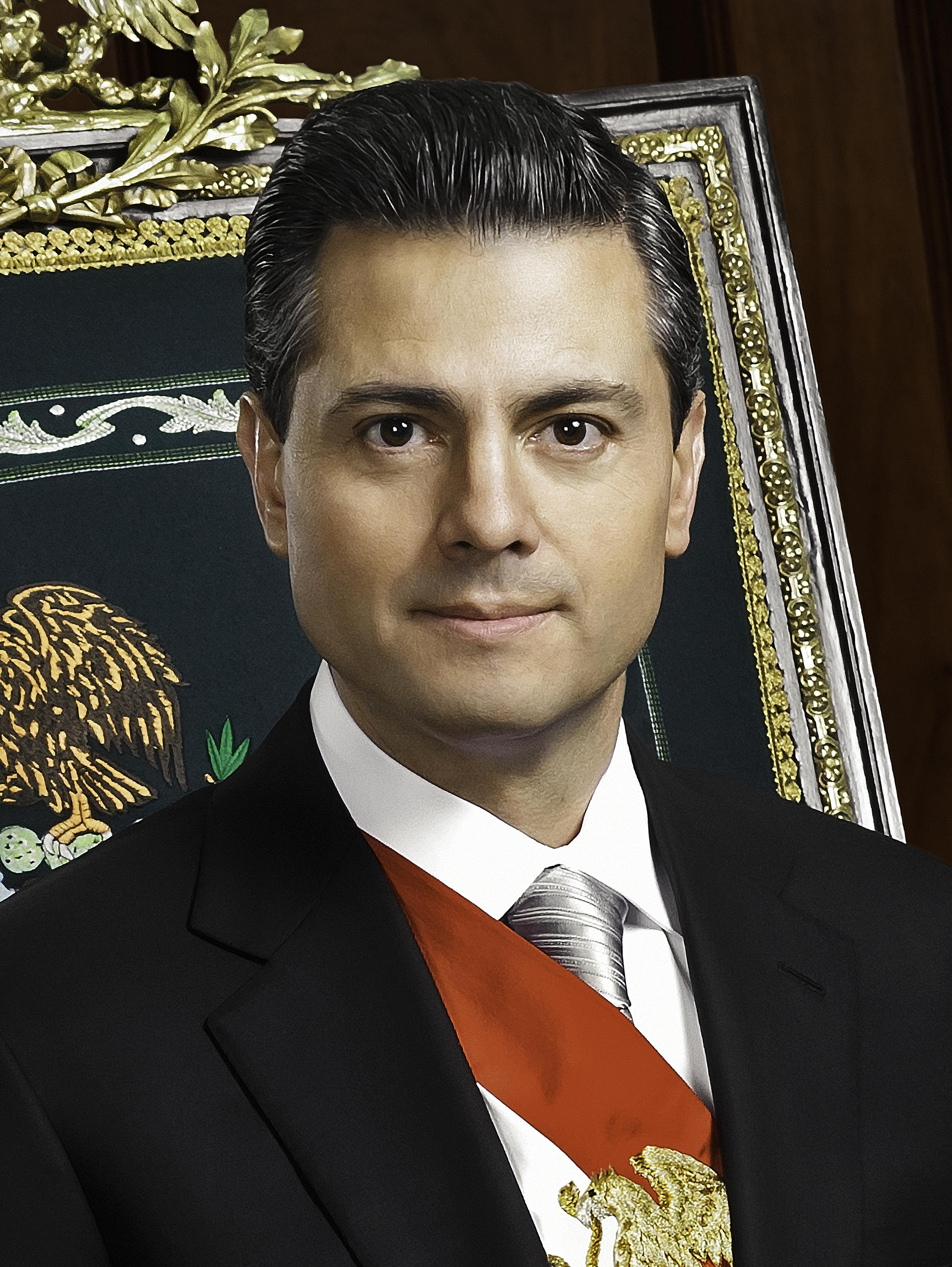
Mexico
Enrique Peña Nieto, President

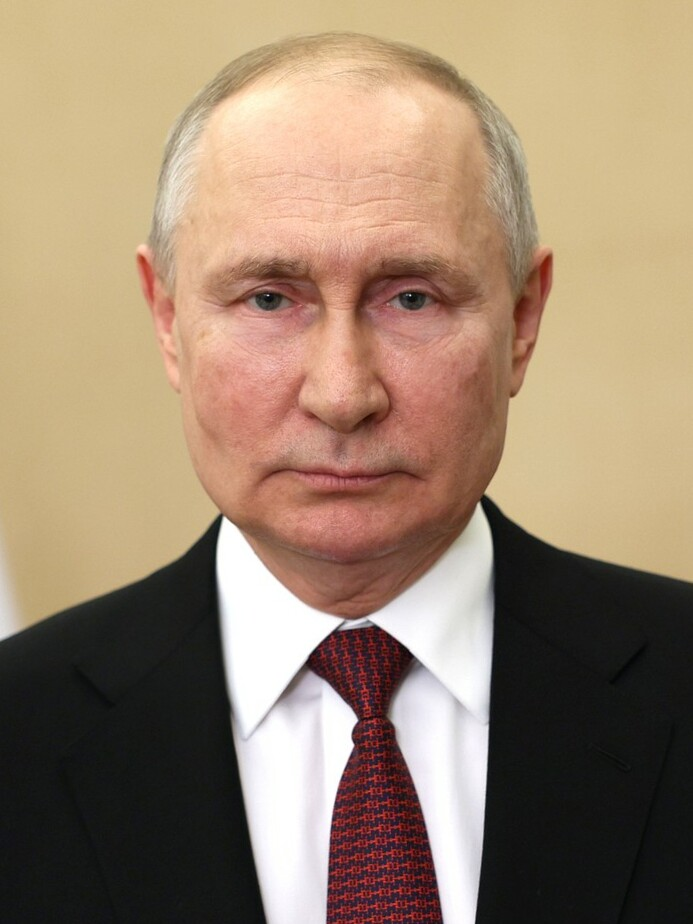
Russia
Vladimir Putin, President

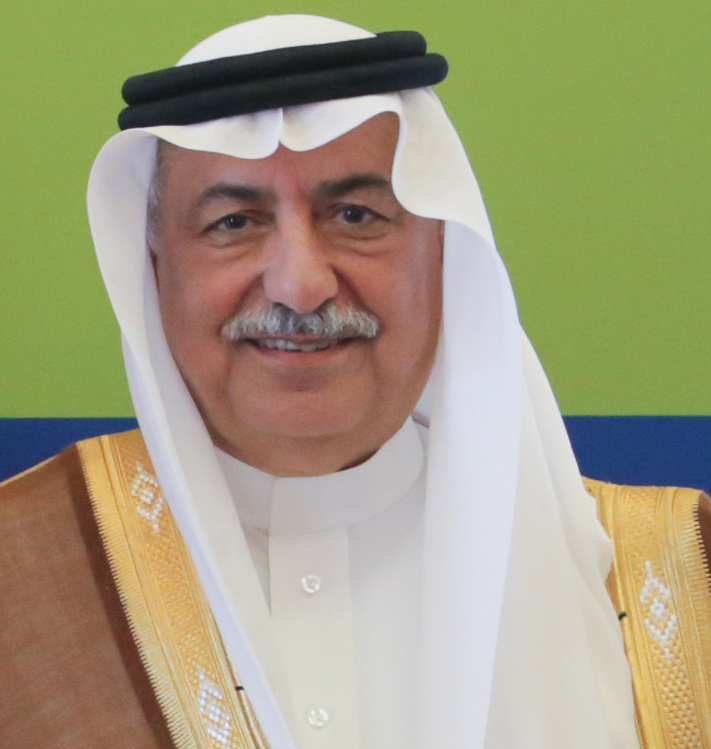
Saudi Arabia
Ibrahim Abdulaziz Al-Assaf, State Minister

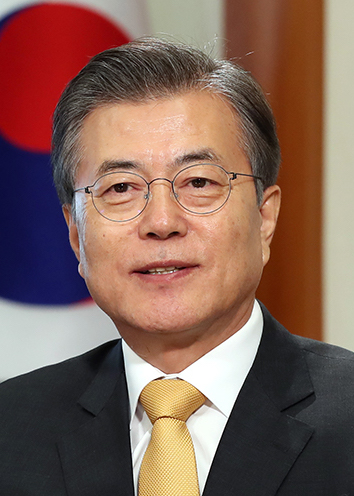
South Korea
Moon Jae-in, President

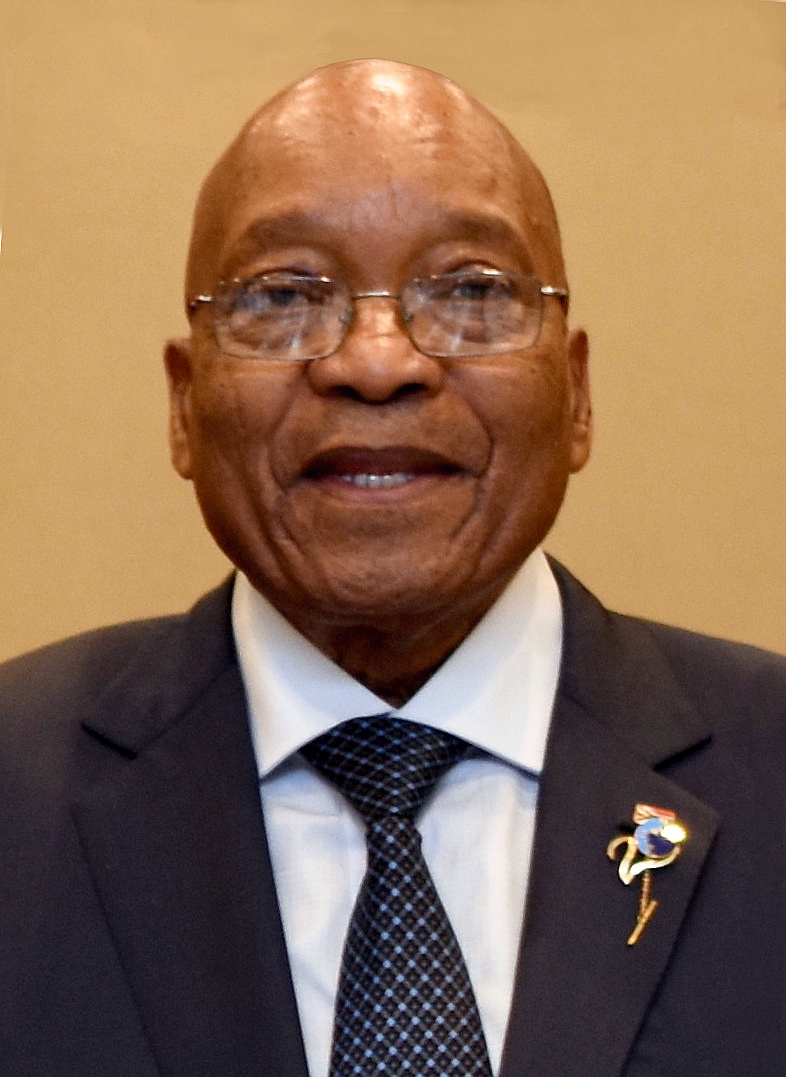
South Africa
Jacob Zuma, President

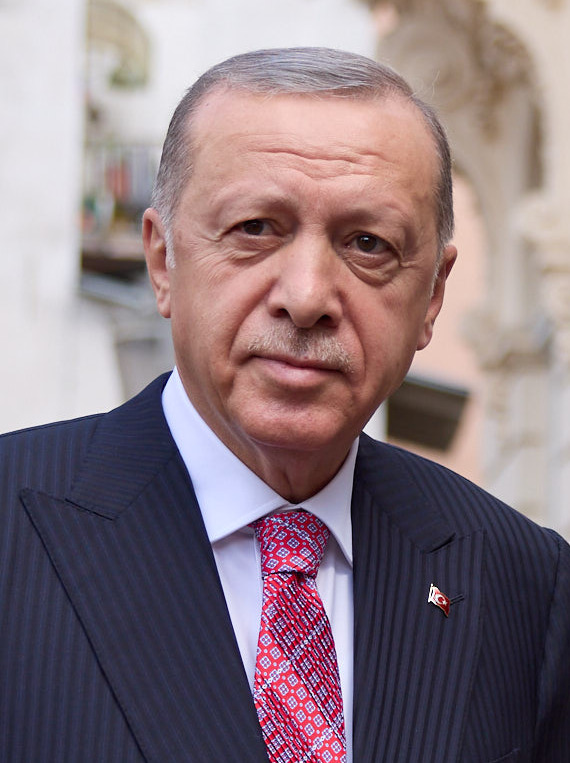
Turkey
Recep Tayyip Erdoğan, President

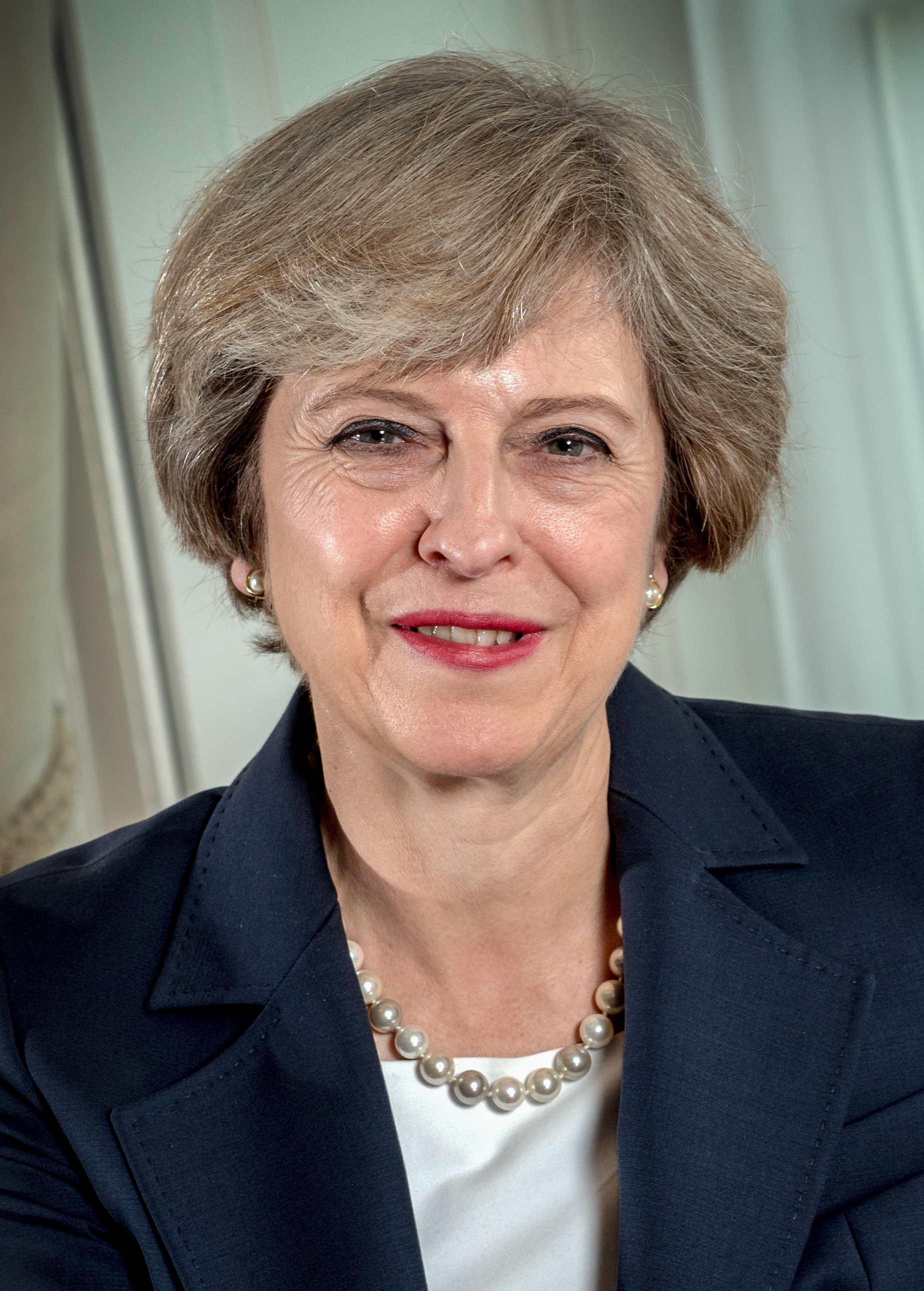
United Kingdom
Theresa May, Prime Minister

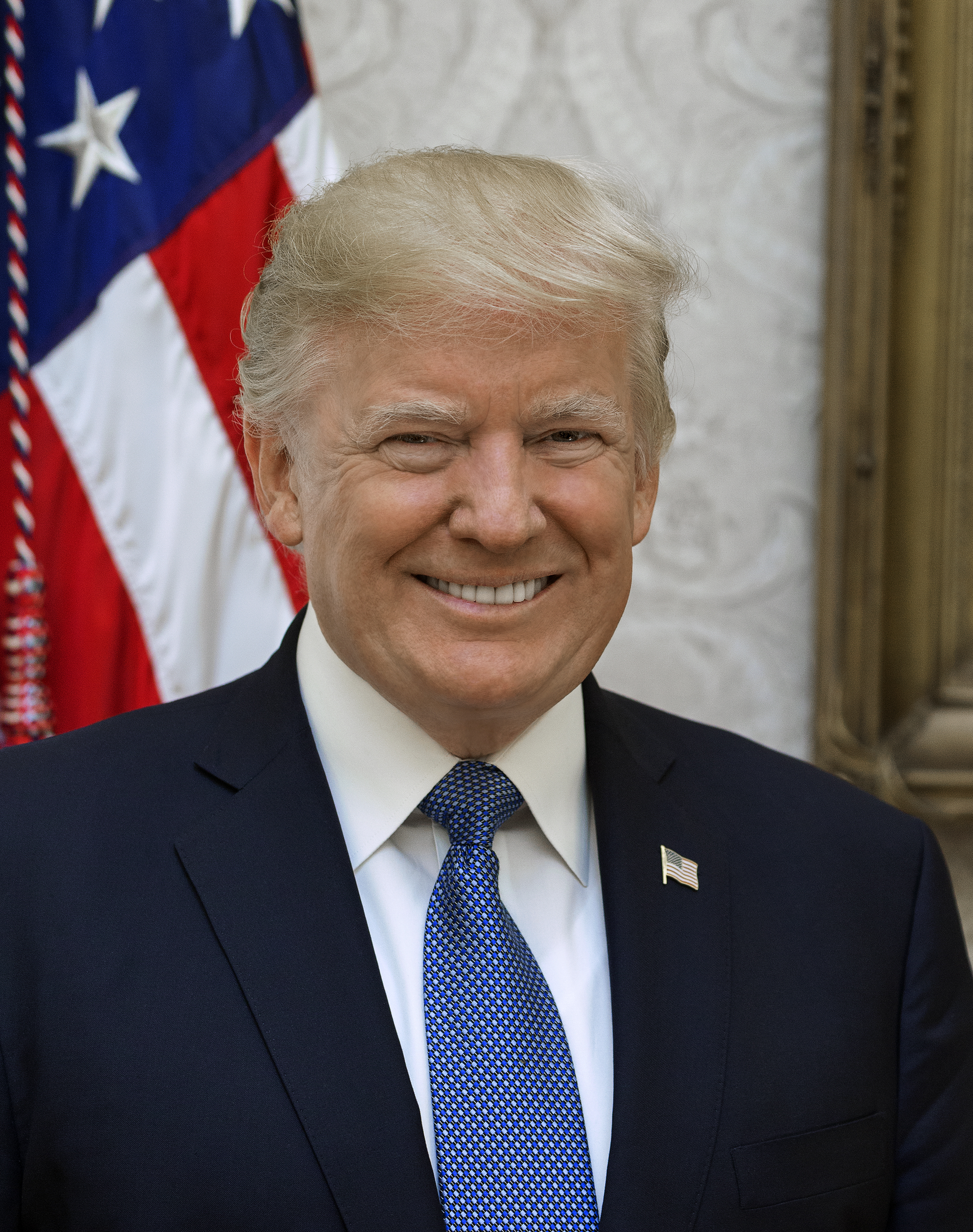
United States
Donald Trump, President

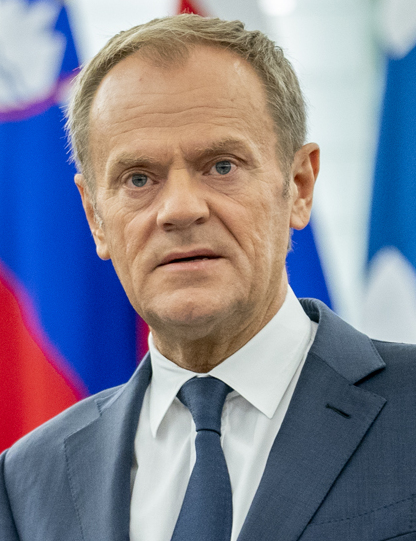
European Union
Donald Tusk, President of the European Council

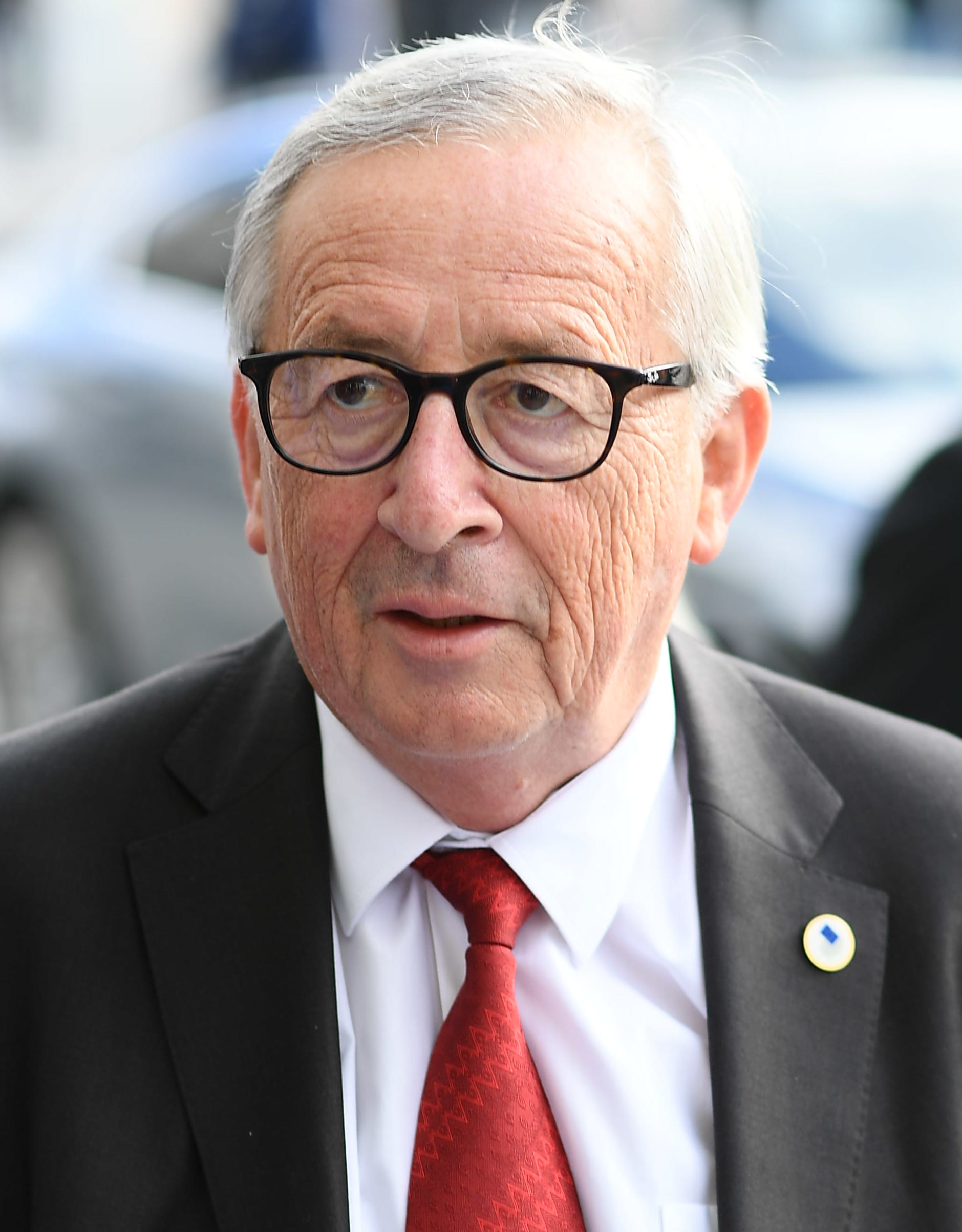
European Union
Jean-Claude Juncker, President of the European Commission

=== Guest invitees ===
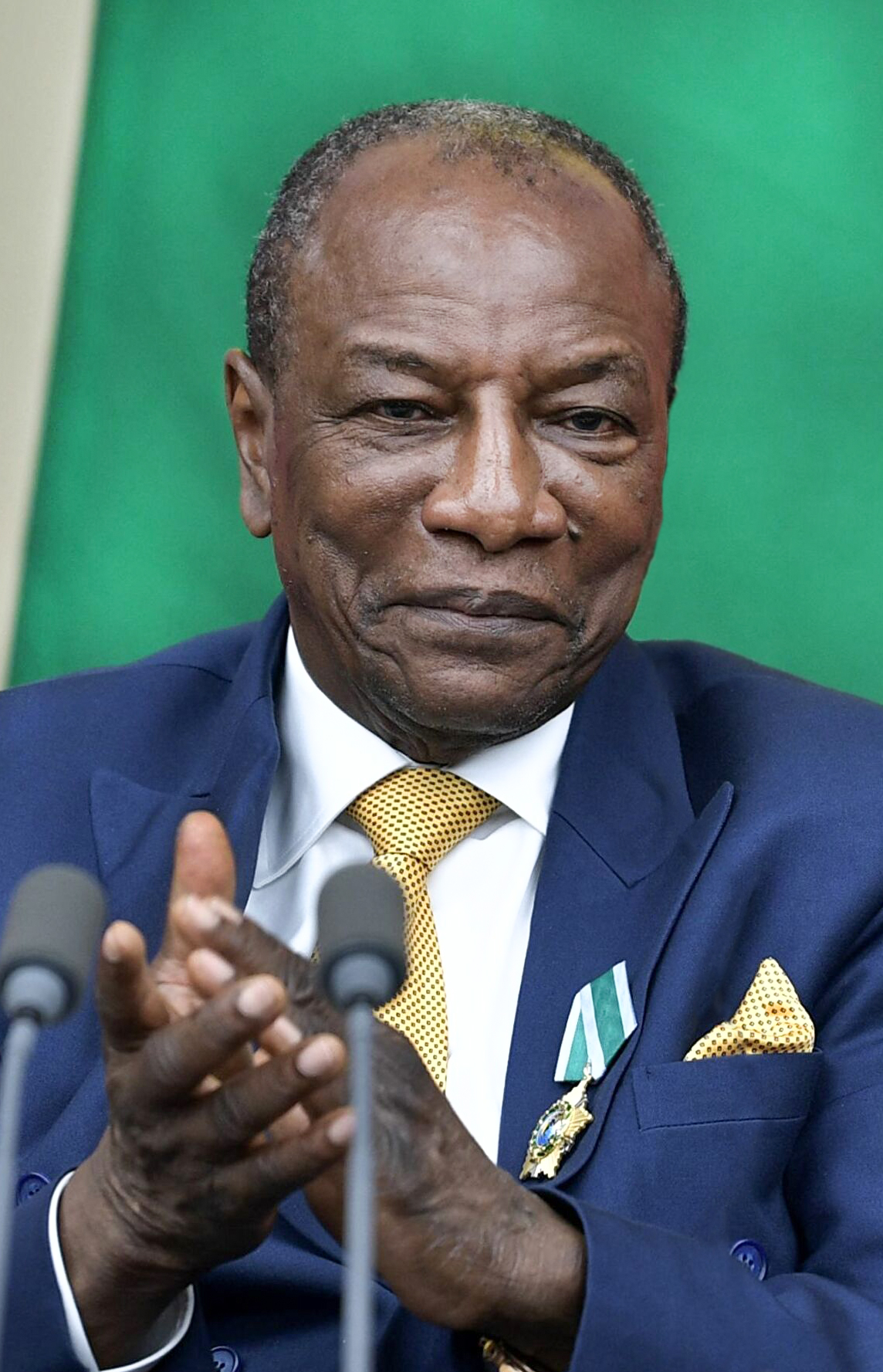
Guinea
Alpha Condé, President, 2017 chairperson of the African Union

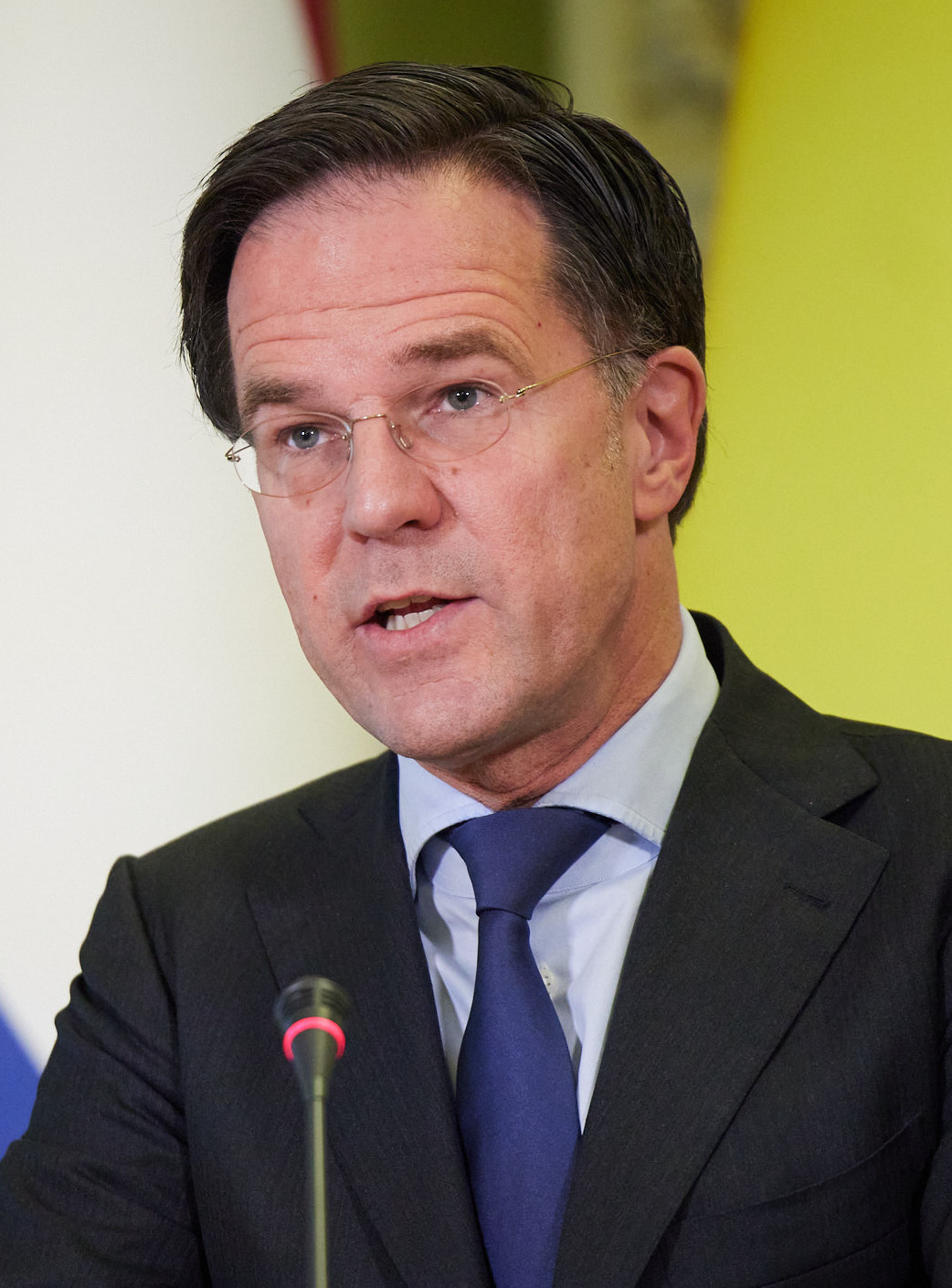
Netherlands
Mark Rutte, Prime Minister

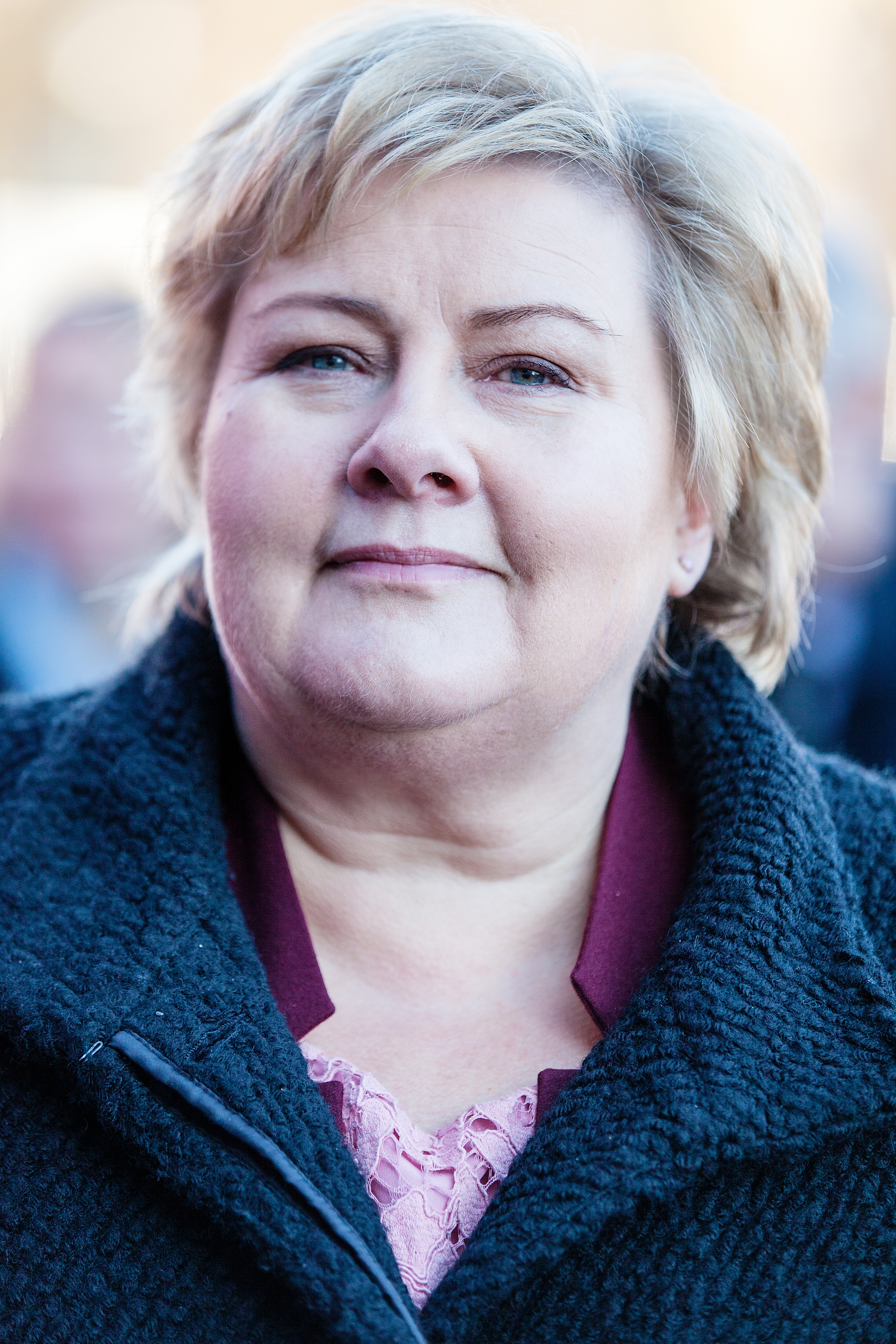
Norway
Erna Solberg, Prime Minister

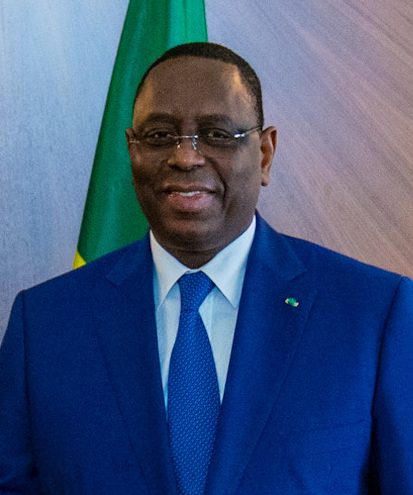
Senegal
Macky Sall, President, president of New Partnership for Africa's Development

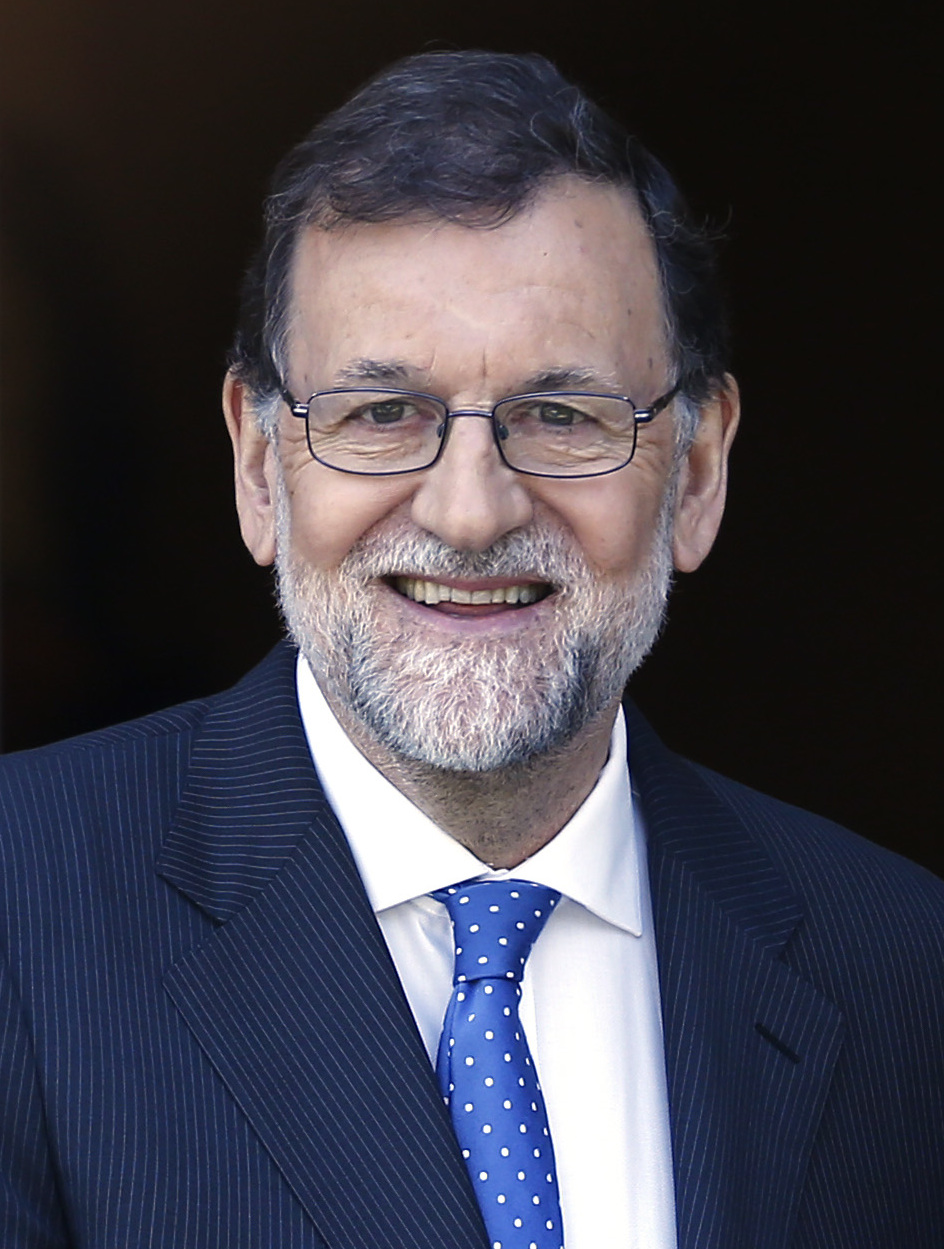
Spain
Mariano Rajoy, Prime Minister, permanent guest invitee

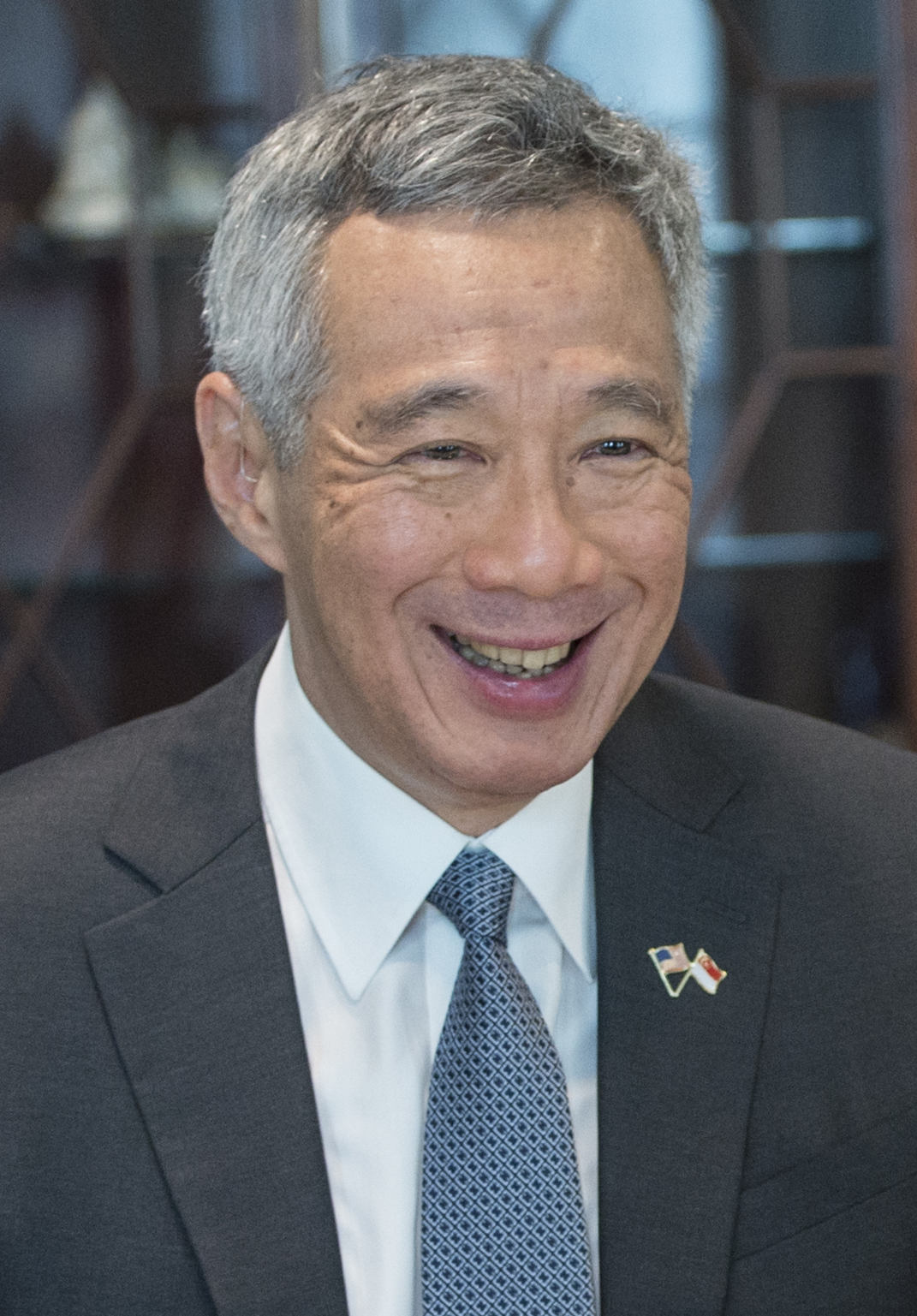
Singapore
Lee Hsien Loong, Prime Minister

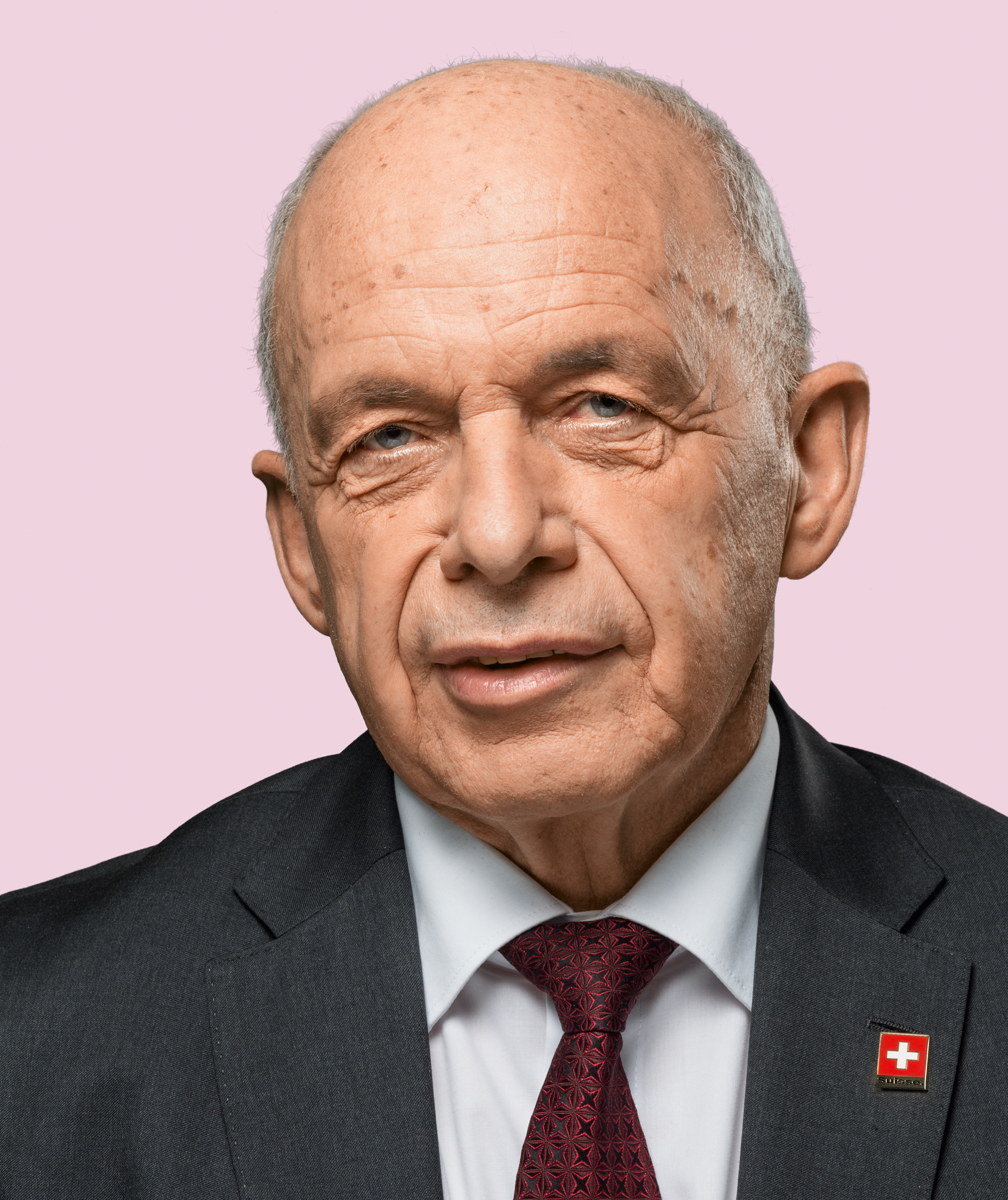
Switzerland
Ueli Maurer, Member of the Swiss Federal Council (Finance Minister)

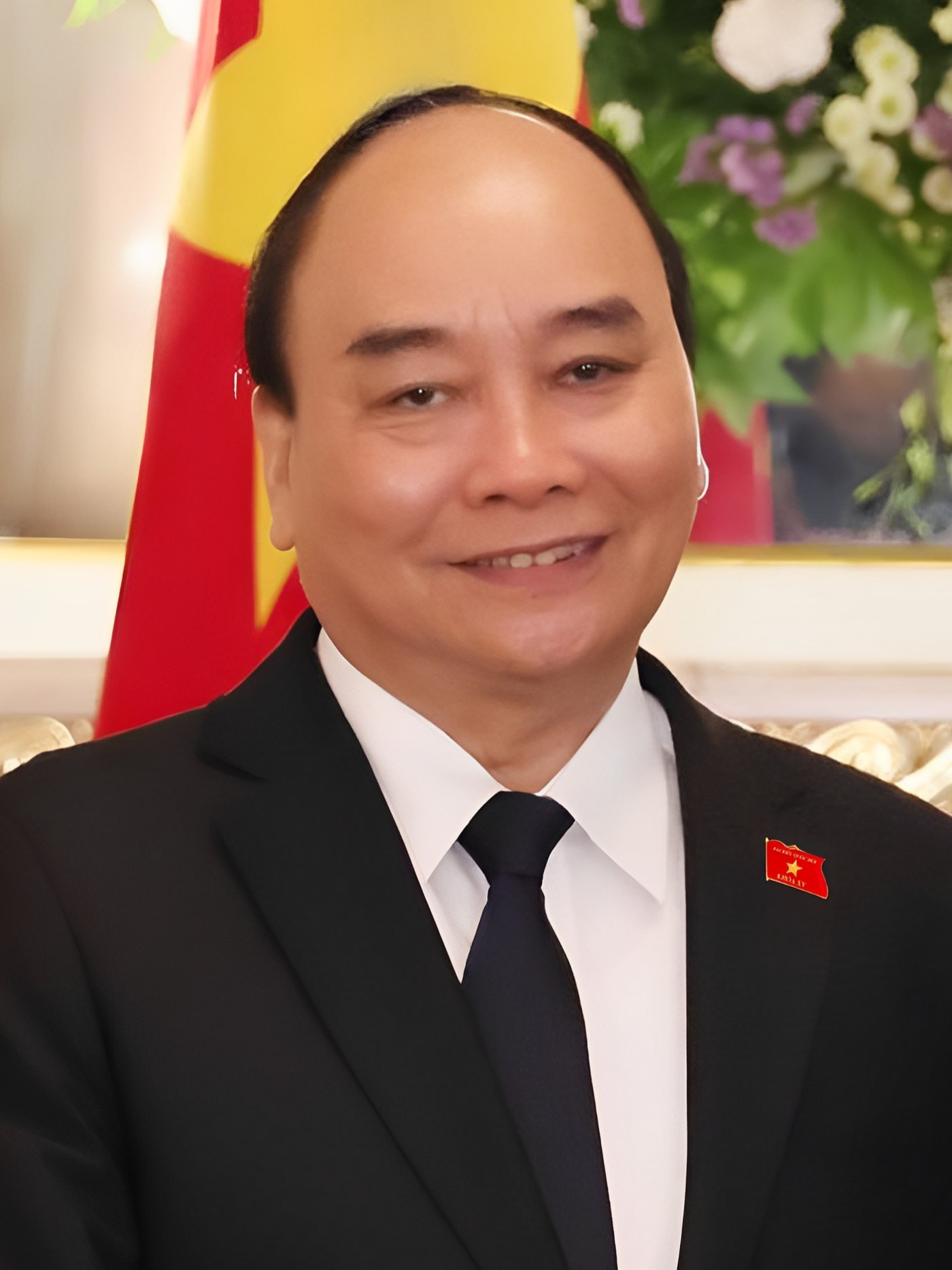
Vietnam
Nguyễn Xuân Phúc, Prime Minister, 2017 APEC host

=== Brazil incertitude ===
Brazilian President Michel Temer initially cancelled his trip to Hamburg without giving any reasons, facing corruption charges by General Prosecutor Rodrigo Janot, who had accused him of accepting bribes from meat company JBS S.A. On 4 July Temer reversed his decision.

=== Saudi Arabian delegation ===
King Salman cancelled his plan to participate at the summit and sent State Minister Ibrahim Abdulaziz Al-Assaf on his behalf to lead the Kingdom's delegation to the summit. No official reason was provided.

=== International organizations ===
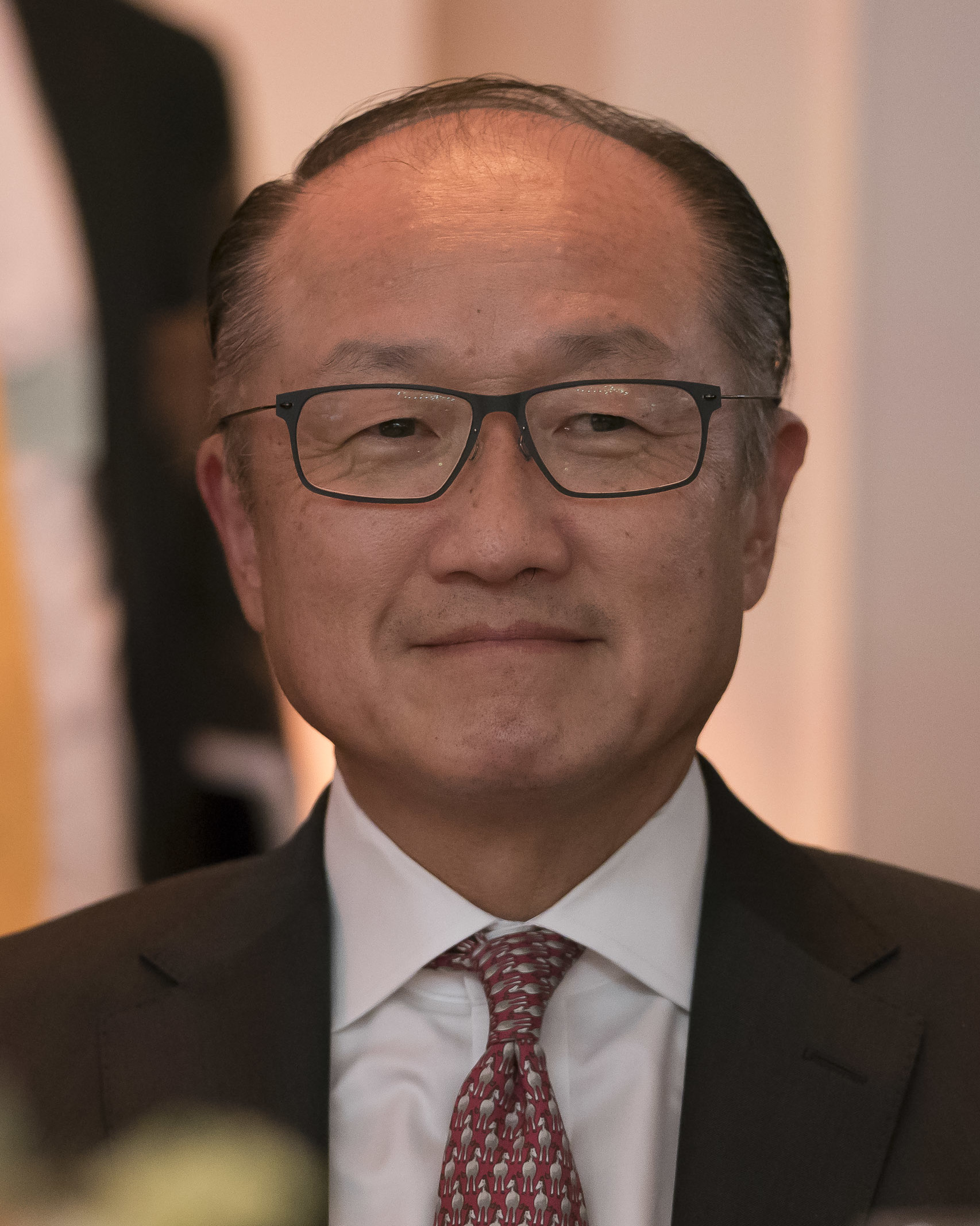
World Bank
Jim Yong Kim, President

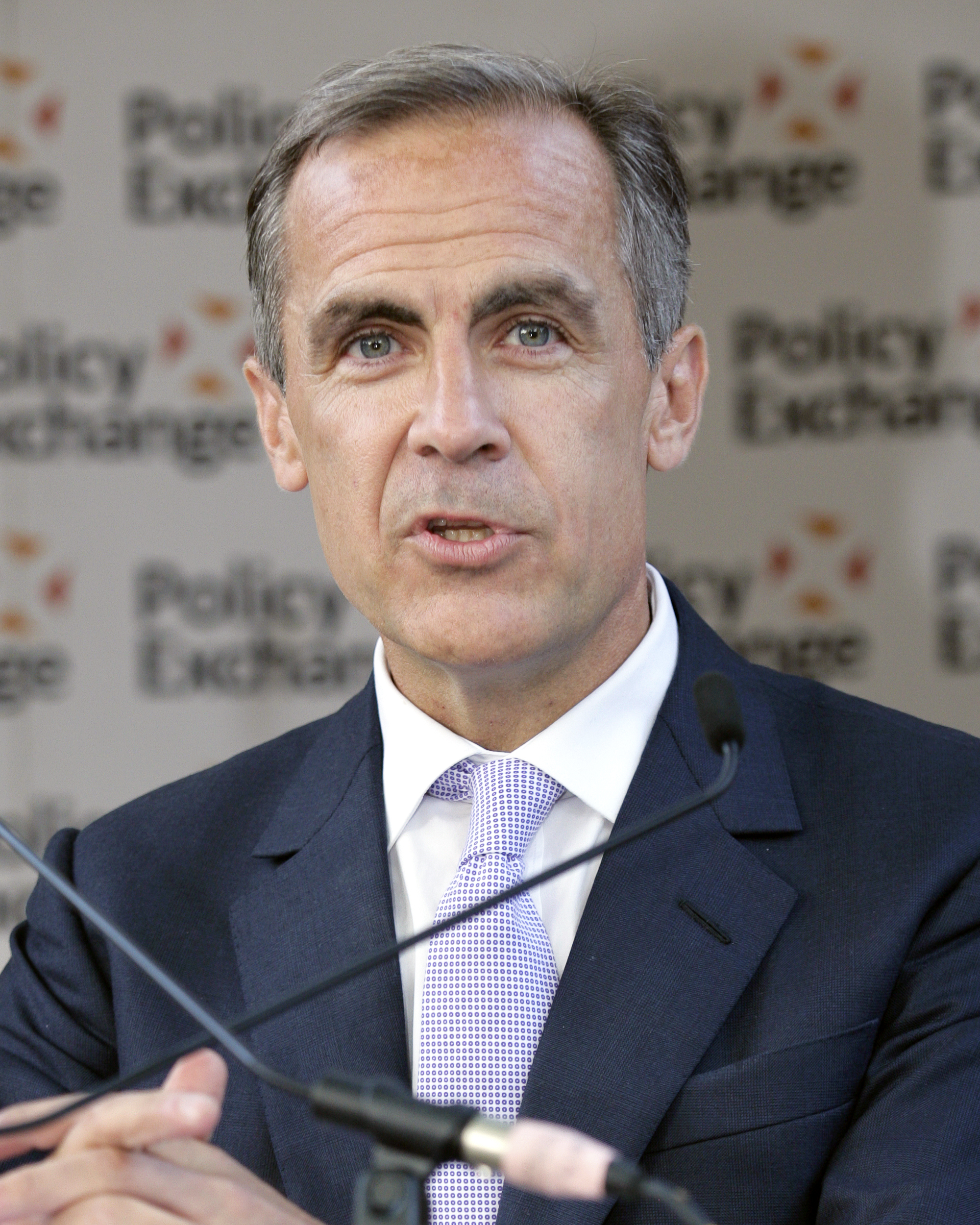
Financial Stability Board (FSB)
Mark Carney, President

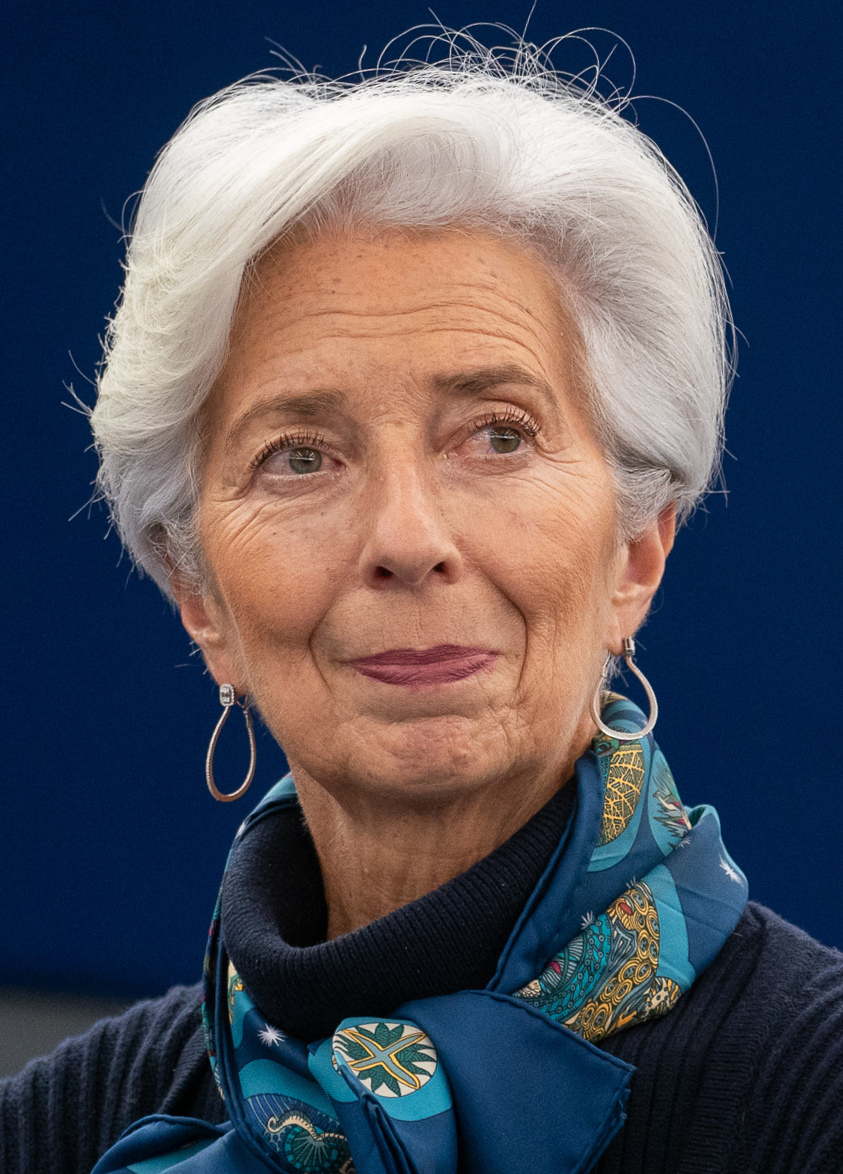
International Monetary Fund (IMF)
Christine Lagarde, director

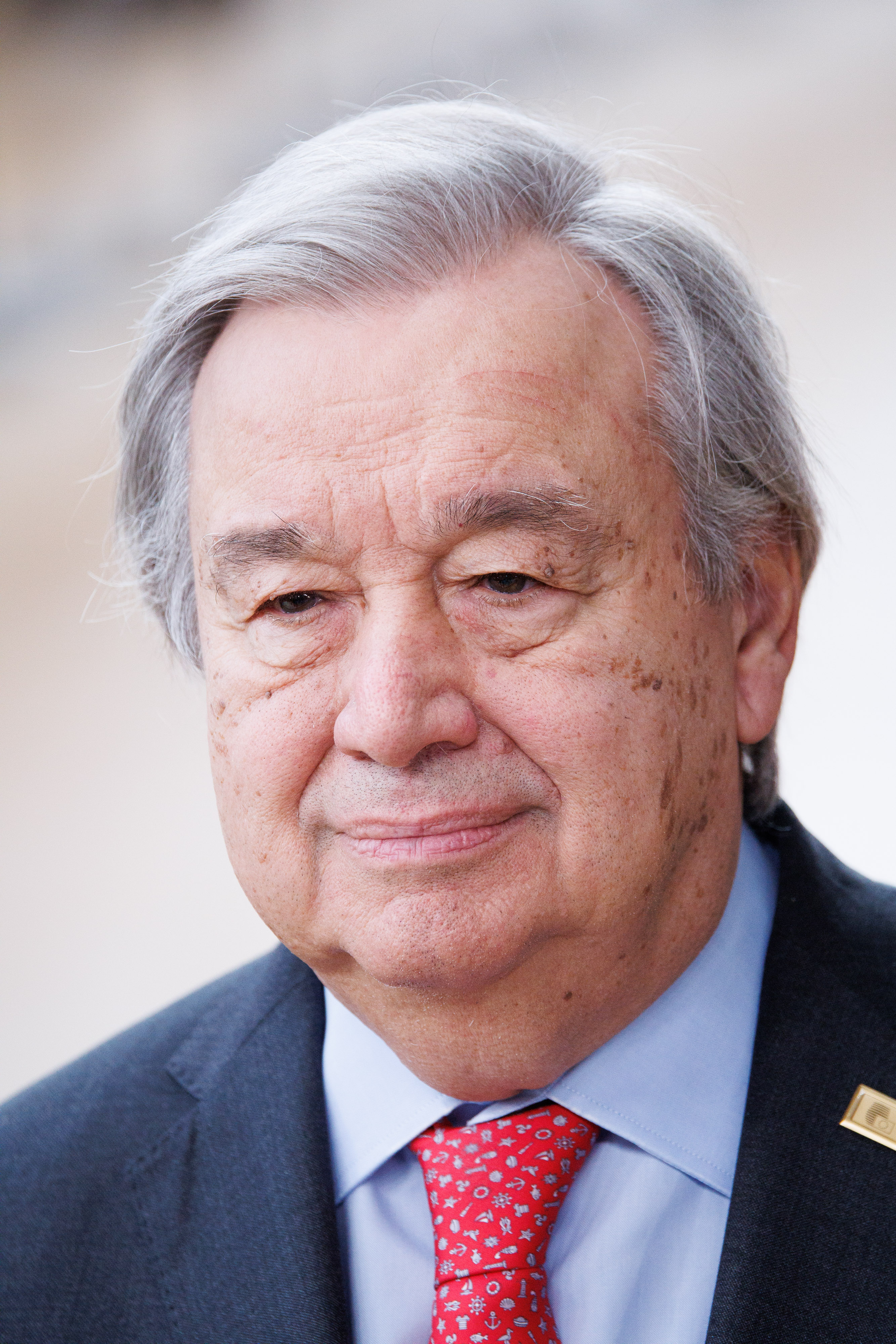
United Nations
António Guterres, Secretary-General

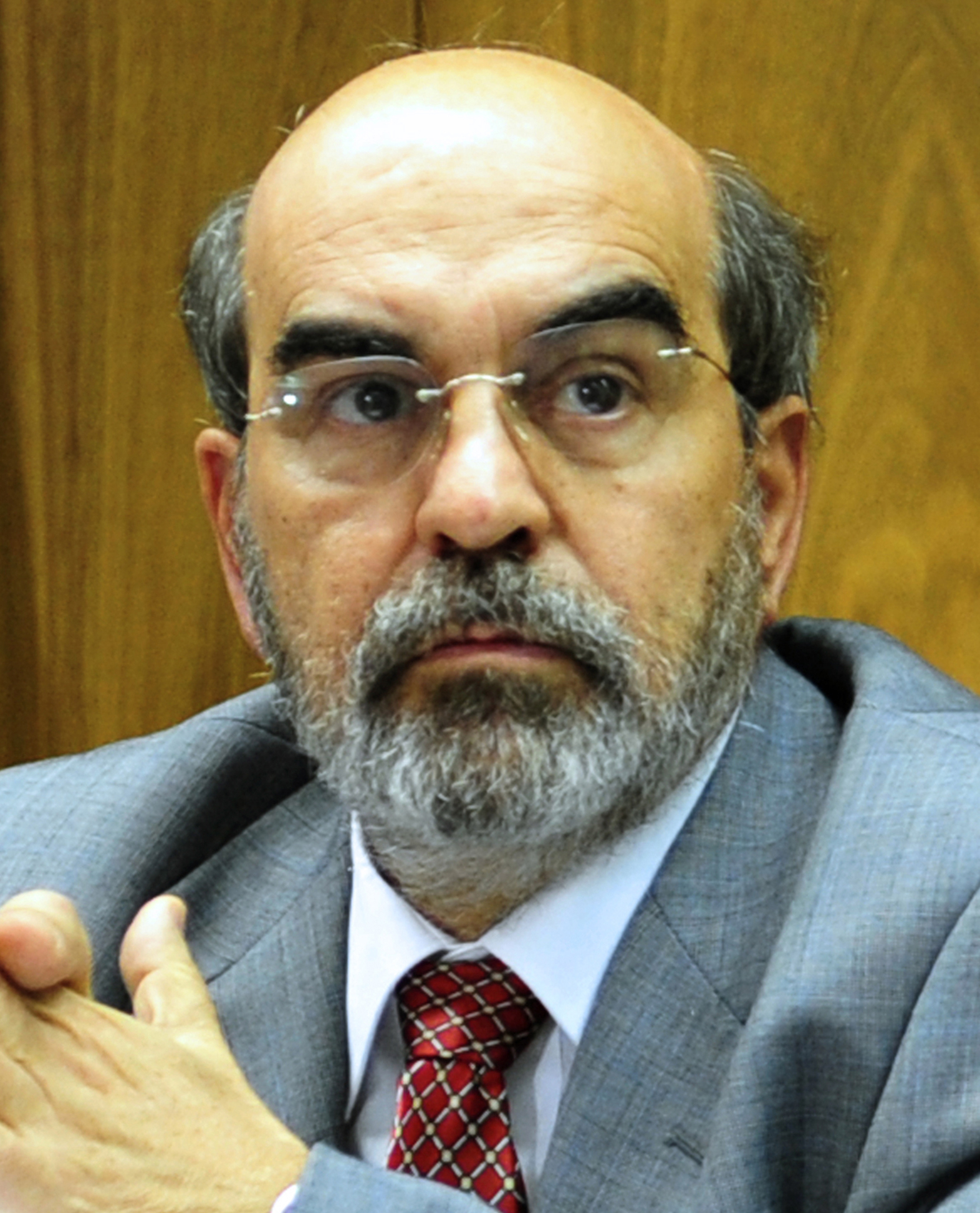
Food and Agriculture Organization (FAO)
José Graziano da Silva, director

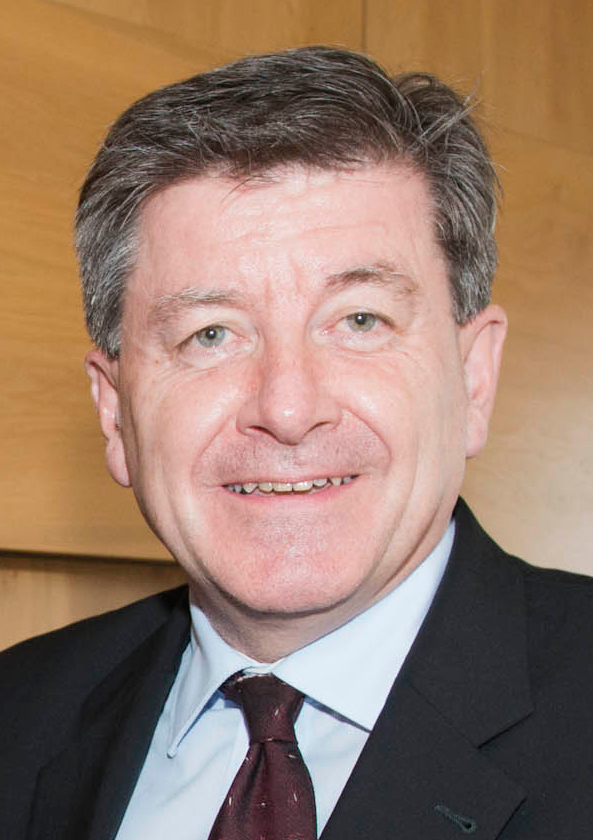
International Labour Organization (ILO)
Guy Ryder, director

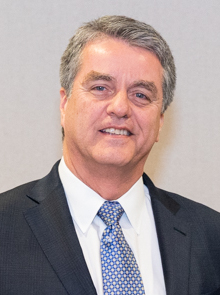
World Trade Organization (WTO)
Roberto Azevêdo, director

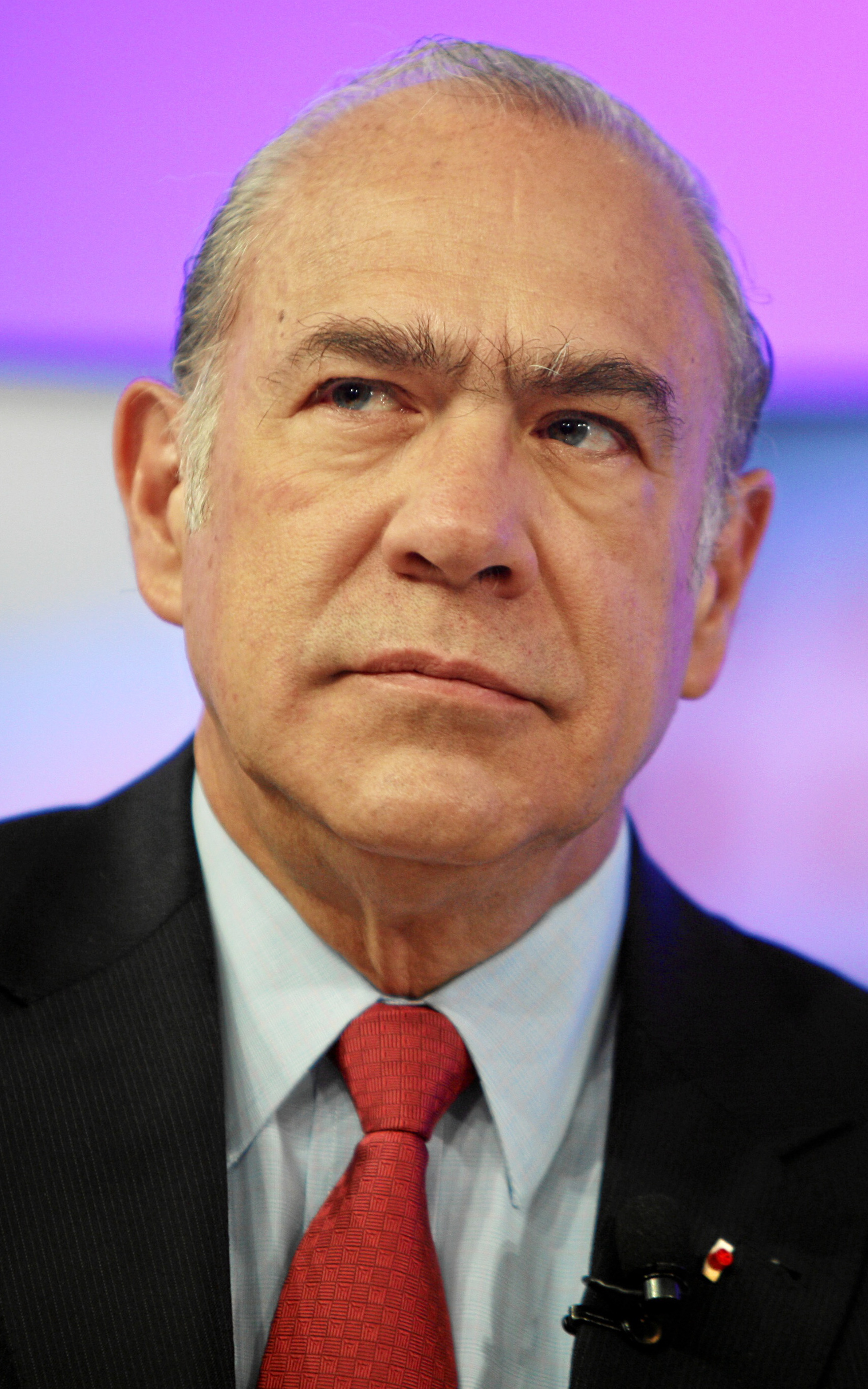
Organisation for Economic Co-operation and Development (OECD)
José Ángel Gurría, Secretary-General

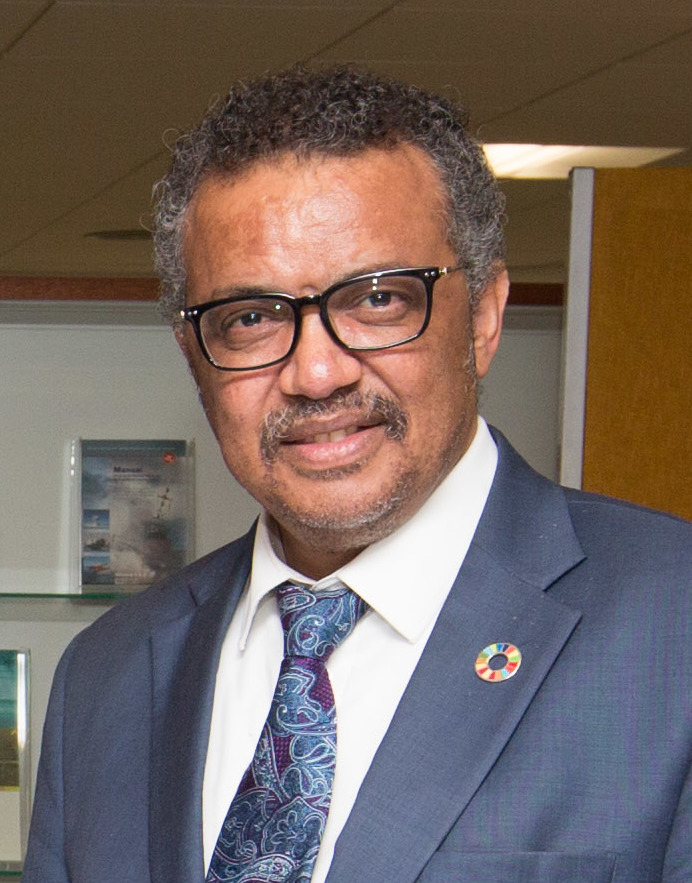
World Health Organization (WHO)
Tedros Adhanom, Director-General

== Security ==
Security zones with limited access, and a significantly larger presence of Hamburg police assisted by police from other forces, were in place from 5 to 8 July; further reinforcements from across the country were deployed as protests developed. Forty-five water cannons were available, and a no-fly zone was in place over portions of the city.

== Protests and riots ==
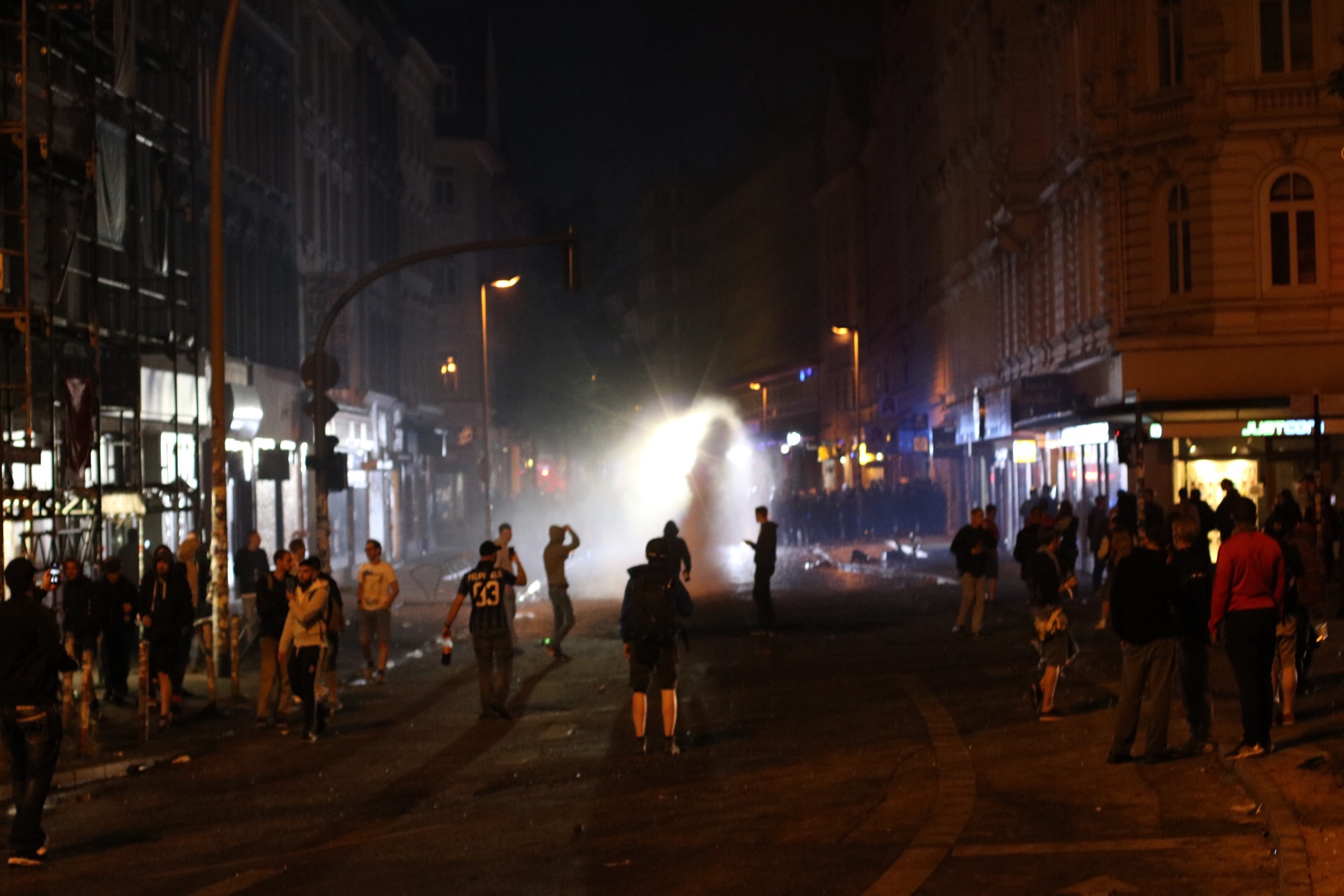
Riots on the Schulterblatt

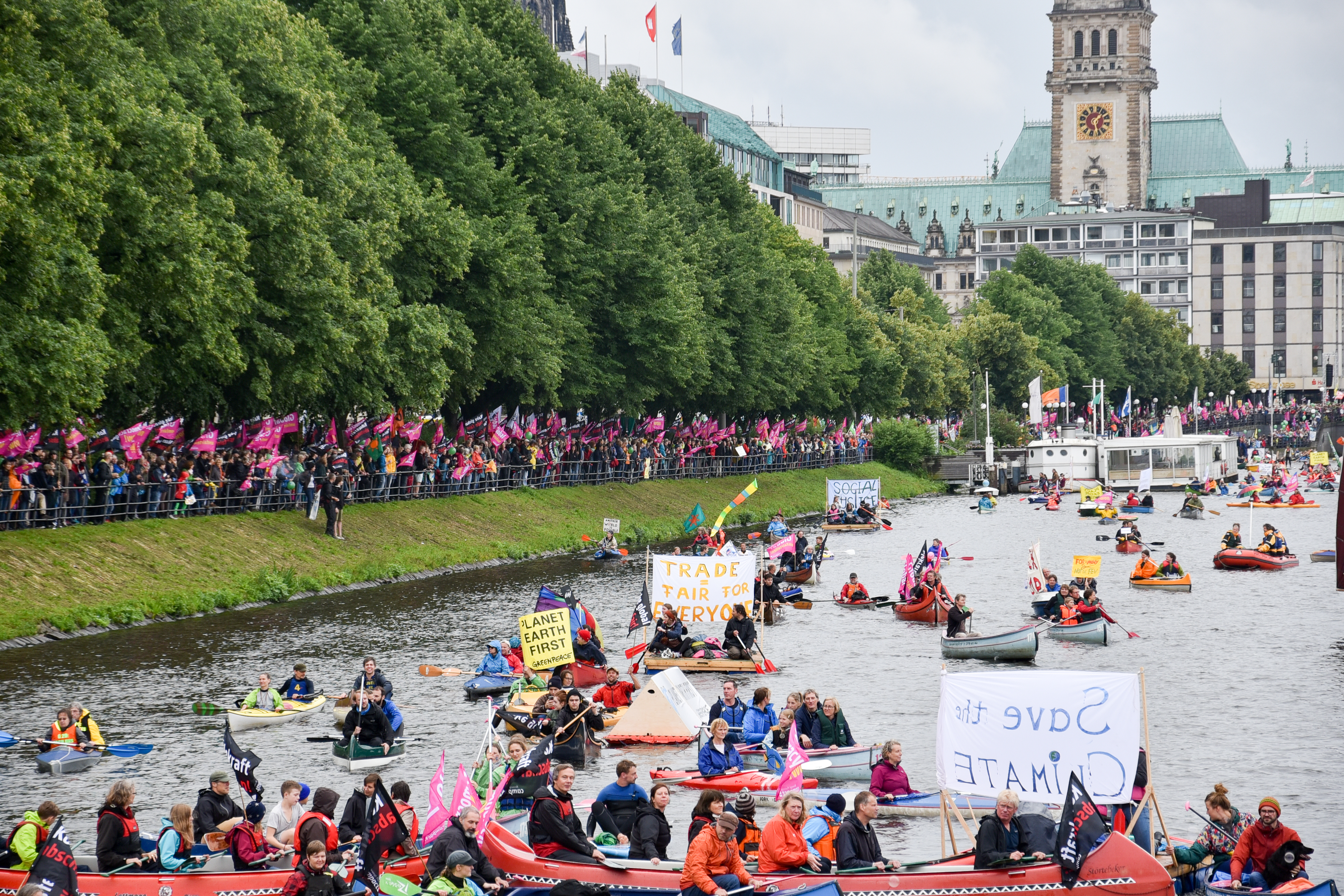
Peaceful demonstration in boats, Binnenalster in Hamburg near town hall (2 July)

The G20 summit was the main focus of German far left propaganda in 2017. More than 320 police officers were injured in the riots. Interior minister Horst Seehofer especially criticized that photos of police on duty during the summit were spread in the far left networks. Of the 1135 far-left violent incidents in that year in Germany, 832 occurred during the summit.

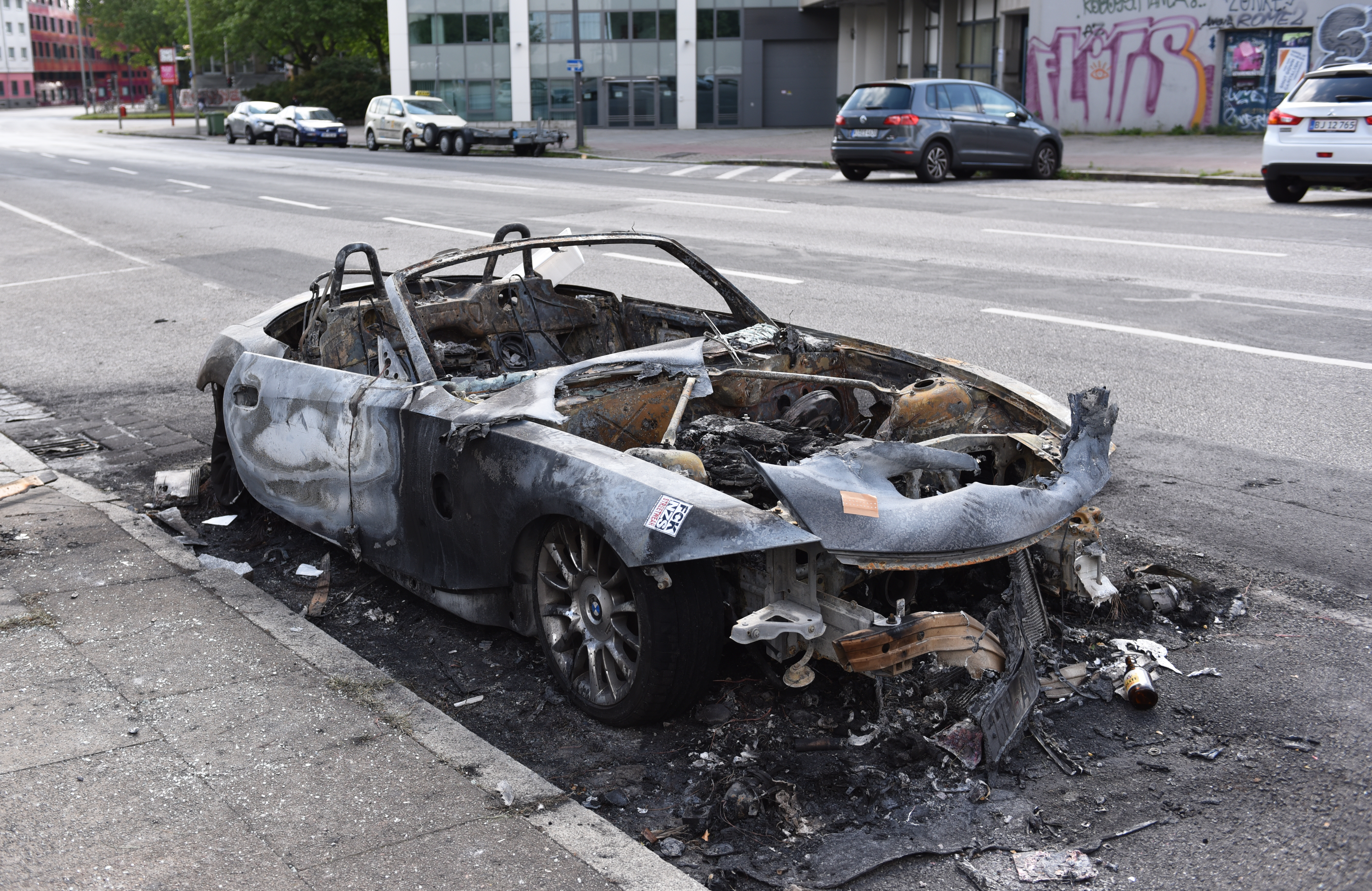
A burnt BMW car after the first night of riots

In the weeks prior to the summit, sporadic car fires in remote places, such as the neighborhood of Blankenese, occurred regularly in the city. On the night of 18 June 2017, unidentified individuals in Berlin, Hamburg, Cologne, Dortmund, Leipzig, and Bad Bevensen caused a total of 13 arson attacks on tracks of the German railways. A security expert was quoted by the German press agency DPA as saying that a connection to left-wing extremism related to the upcoming G20 Summit was "conceivable". According to a German interior ministry spokesman, cable fires had been caused by "unconventional explosive and incendiary devices". In spite of high temperatures (30 °C, 86 °F) on 18 June, police discounted the possibility that the fires had been caused by hot weather.

On 19 June, a group called "Shutdown G20 – Hamburg vom Netz nehmen!" claimed responsibility for the attacks in an internet post.

On 2 July, Greenpeace activists forced a bulk freighter loaded with charcoal from Murmansk arriving in the city to stop. The police intervened and the vessel was allowed to pass through.

During the G20 week a large variety of over 25 registered protest actions and marches were planned to take place in the city of Hamburg. They included an alternative Global Solidarity Summit from 5 to 6 July and a peaceful dance-protest-march Lieber tanz ich als g20 with between 11,000 and 20,000 people attending on 5 July.

Around one thousand performance artists called 1000 Gestalten covered themselves in grey pigment and slowly walked through the streets like zombies. This performance was done to draw awareness of political apathy. After walking, they all removed their grey clothes. Underneath were colourful clothes that symbolized becoming engaged and awake.

On 6 July, protests turned violent when over 160 police were injured in clashes with protestors and more than 75 people were arrested. As protestors attempted to storm into the "red zone" where the summit took place they were dispersed with water cannons. Some protestors stated their goal was to block the attendees route to the summit venue; US First Lady Melania Trump was unable to attend a harbor cruise on account of the protests.

On 7 July rioters set dozens of parked cars on fire. Several shops were destroyed and looted during 7 July night-time riots in the Schanzenviertel area. Masked rioters and militants from the "black bloc" went uncontrolled for a period of three hours, prompting the deployment of special armed police forces to end the violence.

On 8 July, 76,000 people attended the largest peaceful protest march "Solidarity without Borders", organized by an alliance of 174 groups and organizations.

On early Sunday morning, 9 July, riots continued in the Schanzenviertel though the G20 leaders had already departed; 144 rioters were arrested.

In total, more than 15,000 police were deployed from across the country, while 100,000 protesters attended.

Local residents believed that authorities made a mistake by having the summit in a densely populated area. Police arrested 186 people overall: 132 Germans, 8 French, 7 Italians, 5 Swiss and citizens of Russia and Spain. An additional 225 people were taken into temporary custody.

In the analysis by German police, it was estimated that the far-left protesters had committed more than 2000 crimes, among them vandalism (575), bodily harm (330), disturbing the peace (303), arson (123) and resisting arrest (45).

Activists and media criticised police reactions to the protests, accusing them of violence and intentional conflict escalation.

The riots prompted debates in the Hamburg Senate on violence from leftist militants and how to mitigate further violence in the future. Researchers concluded that methods that had been successful in reducing violence from right-wing and Islamist militants could not be re-used against left-wing militants.

=== Investigations and trials ===
In January 2020 there were thousands of court proceedings underway, where police was processing 3580 cases. Police had identified 135 suspects which were sought with photographs. Also there were 156 complaints against police, 109 of which had been dismissed. Left politicians in the Hamburg council complained that no proceeding against police had started.

In July 2020, five men, four from Hesse in Germany and one from France were found guilty on riot charges after a trial which lasted 18 months. The French citizen was found guilty of inciting arson, causing bodily harm and assaulting police and was sentenced to three years in prison. The four German defendants received probationary sentences or community service. The prosecutor had called for prison sentences for all five for committing arson.

In 2022 a court ruled that the German police's response was unlawful.

A parliamentary investigation led by Alliance 90/The Greens MP Valentin Lippman found that excessive force was used by divisions of the Saxony state police. More particularly it was found that around 15 rubber bullets were shot from HK69A1 grenade launchers at protestors despite the use of such tools being forbidden in Germany.

=== Incidents ===
On the eve of the G20 summit in Hamburg, China's most famous political prisoner, democracy activist and Nobel laureate Liu Xiaobo, had been given medical parole after being diagnosed with terminal liver cancer.

Turkey arrested 12 people in Istanbul on the eve of the G20 summit in Hamburg in July 2017 during the "digital security and information management workshop". They included İdil Eser, the head of Amnesty International Turkey. Activists detained included İlknur Üstün of the Women's Coalition, lawyer Günal Kurşun and Veli Acu of the Human Rights Agenda Association.
