= Timeline of the first Trump presidency (2017 Q3) =

The following is a timeline of the first presidency of Donald Trump during the third quarter of 2017, from July 1 to September 30, 2017. For a complete itinerary of his travels, see List of presidential trips made by Donald Trump (2017). To navigate between quarters, see timeline of the Donald Trump presidencies. For the Q3 timeline see timeline of the first Trump presidency (2017 Q4).

== Overview ==
=== Economy ===
Real GDP growth increased at an annual rate of 3.2%, despite a particularly bad 2017 Atlantic hurricane season. This was due to an increase in consumer spending, private inventory investment, non-residential fixed investment, increased exports, decreased imports, and increased federal government spending. This gain was offset by residential fixed investment and local government spending.

=== Public opinion ===
According to FiveThirtyEight, President Trump concluded this quarter with an approval rating of 38.6%, representing a quarterly decline of 1%, and a decline of 6.9% since his inauguration.

== Timeline ==
=== July 2017 ===
Date	Events	Photos/videos
Saturday, July 1	President Trump attends the Celebrate Freedom Concert in Washington, paying tribute to military veterans.; President Trump highlights on Twitter the refusal of 25 states to submit some or all requested voter information to the Presidential Advisory Commission on Election Integrity.	
Sunday, July 2	President Trump makes telephone calls to Chinese president Xi Jinping and Japanese prime minister Shinzō Abe to discuss trade issues and the North Korean threat.; President Trump has telephone conversations with Saudi Arabia's king Salman bin Abdulaziz, Abu Dhabi's crown prince Sheikh Mohammed bin Zayed Al Nahyan, and Qatar's Emir Sheikh Tamim bin Hamad Al Thani, regarding regional peace and counter-terrorism.	
Monday, July 3	President Trump speaks by telephone to German Chancellor Angela Merkel discussing issues including climate change, the Women's Entrepreneurship Financing Initiative and trade.; President Trump discusses by telephone the migration crisis and the upcoming G20 summit with Italian prime minister Paolo Gentiloni.	
Tuesday, July 4	President Trump condemns on Twitter the successful test launch of a North Korean ICBM potentially capable of reaching Alaska or Australia.; Vice President Pence attends a Fourth of July Parade at Grandville, Michigan, with governor Rick Snyder.; Secretary of State Rex Tillerson says the U.S. "will never accept a nuclear-armed North Korea".; The number of U.S. states refusing to comply with President Trump's Commission on Election Integrity is reported to have risen to 44.; President Trump hosts military personnel and their families for a picnic and fireworks show at the White House as part of Independence Day celebrations.	
Wednesday, July 5	President Trump, his family and advisors arrive in Warsaw, Poland, ahead of the G20 summit.; Ambassador Haley informs the UN Security Council that the U.S. is prepared to deploy any of its military options to defend itself and its allies from North Korea if other options fail.; Kris Kobach, vice-chairman of the Commission on Election Integrity, confirms that 20 states have provided them with voter information, while 14 states and the District of Columbia have refused to do so.	
Thursday, July 6	President Trump attends a joint press conference in Warsaw with Polish president Andrzej Duda, reaffirming the U.S. commitment to NATO and citing the "severe" options available in respect of North Korea.; President Trump, with the First Lady, attends a wreath-laying ceremony at the Warsaw Uprising Monument and delivers a speech in defense of shared democratic values, calling on Russia to cease all destabilizing activity.; President Trump attends the Three Seas Initiative to discuss reduction of Central and Eastern European nations' dependency on Russian oil and gas imports and increased U.S. LNG imports.; President Trump meets with Croatian president Kolinda Grabar-Kitarovic privately to discuss issues including security and energy.; President Trump arrives in Hamburg, Germany, ahead of the G20 summit.; President Trump meets with German Chancellor Angela Merkel at the Hotel Atlantic to discuss issues such as trade, climate change, global security and the threat of North Korea's nuclear program.; President Trump attends the Northeast Asia Security Dinner, discussing with South Korean president Moon Jae-in and Japanese prime minister Shinzo Abe calling on China to restrain North Korea's nuclear ambitions.; Vice President Pence visits the Kennedy Space Center.; Walter Shaub, Director of the U.S. Office of Government Ethics (OGE), resigns effective July 19.	President Trump and Polish President Andrzej Duda
Friday, July 7	President Trump attends the G20 summit hosted by German Chancellor Angela Merkel.; President Trump holds a bilateral meeting with Mexican president Enrique Peña Nieto, during which he reiterates the call for Mexico to pay for the border wall.; President Trump holds a bilateral meeting with Russian president Vladimir Putin, calling for improved relations. An undisclosed second meeting between the two occurs later in the day.; Secretary of State Tillerson appoints Kurt Volker Special Representative for Ukraine Negotiations.	G-20 leaders at the 2017 G-20 Hamburg Summit
Saturday, July 8	President Trump holds a bilateral meeting with British prime minister Theresa May, promising to expedite a new trade deal.; The Women Entrepreneurs Finance Initiative is launched by First Daughter Ivanka Trump and the World Bank whereby the U.S. commits $50 million to the fund.; Ivanka Trump takes President Trump's seat at the G20 summit.; President Trump holds a bilateral meeting with Singaporean prime minister Lee Hsien Loong, welcoming increased U.S. participation in the ASEAN–U.S. Summit, East Asia Summit, and APEC.; President Trump holds a bilateral meeting with Japanese prime minister Shinzō Abe to discuss trade issues and North Korea.; President Trump holds a bilateral meeting with Indonesian president Joko Widodo, promising to work on doing more trade deals and business between the two countries.; President Trump holds a bilateral meeting with Chinese president Xi Jinping, agreeing that both countries should put more pressure on North Korea.; The New York Times reports the existence of a June 9, 2016, meeting between Jared Kushner, Paul Manafort, Donald Trump Jr. and Natalia Veselnitskaya. President Trump says the meeting concerned adoption.	President Trump and Chinese President Xi Jinping
Sunday, July 9	The New York Times reports that Donald Trump Jr. “was promised damaging information about Hillary Clinton before agreeing to meet with a Kremlin-connected Russian lawyer during the 2016 campaign.”; Hours after promoting the idea in which he stated "Putin and I discussed forming an impenetrable cybersecurity unit so that election hacking, and many other negative things, will be guarded and safe," Trump says he did not think it could actually happen.	
Monday, July 10	Vice President Pence holds bilateral meetings with Tunisian Prime Minister Youssef Chahed at the White House. Pence also speaks by telephone to Macedonian Prime Minister Zoran Zaev and Greek Prime Minister Alexis Tsipras.	Vice President Pence and retired Army Staff Sergeant Travis Mills
Tuesday, July 11	President Trump speaks by telephone to Iraqi prime minister Haider al-Abadi to congratulate him on liberation of Mosul and to stress the need for a total defeat of ISIS.; President Trump nominates Lewis Eisenberg to be ambassador to Italy and San Marino. Trump also nominates Stephen B. King to be ambassador to the Czech Republic.	
Wednesday, July 12	President Trump nominates Dennis Shea, vice-chairman of the US–China Economic and Security Review Commission, as deputy U.S. Trade Representative.; President Trump nominates Paul Dabbar, a JP Morgan investment banking executive, as Under Secretary of Energy for Science.	Secretary Tillerson with Saudi Foreign Minister al-Jubeir in Jeddah
Thursday, July 13	President Trump and First Lady Melania Trump arrive in Paris for a two-day state visit. During the visit the president comments that French first lady Brigitte Macron is "in such good shape".; President Trump hosts a ceremony in the American embassy honoring Second World War veterans.; President Trump holds a bilateral meeting with French president Emmanuel Macron at the Élysée Palace discussing counter-terrorism and international affairs.; Secretary of the Interior Ryan Zinke announces the end of reviews to monument modifications in Craters of the Moon National Monument in Idaho and in Washington Hanford Reach National Monument.	President Trump and French President Emmanuel Macron at the Élysée Palace
Friday, July 14	President Trump and First Lady Melania Trump attend a Bastille Day military parade in Paris with French president Emmanuel Macron.; President Trump attends the U.S. Women's Open at Trump National Golf Club at Bedminster, New Jersey.; Vice President Pence, with Canadian prime minister Justin Trudeau, attends a U.S. governors' meeting in Rhode Island for talks on health care and NAFTA.	Bastille Day military parade in Paris
Saturday, July 15		
Sunday, July 16		
Monday, July 17	President Trump launches "Made in America Week" at the White House by showcasing products made in all 50 states.	President Trump at the White House Made in America showcase
Tuesday, July 18	The US military is reported to have rented 2.4 million dollars' worth of space at the Trump Tower.; Vice President Pence attends the Retail Advocates Summit organized by the National Retail Federation promoting tax reform.; President Trump nominates former Utah governor Jon Huntsman Jr. as ambassador to Russia.	President Trump, Vice President Pence, and National Security Adviser McMaster have lunch with service members
Wednesday, July 19	The president says that he would not have hired Jeff Sessions as the attorney general if he had known he would recuse himself from the Russia investigation.; President Trump attends the first meeting of the Commission on Election Integrity chaired by Vice President Pence, calling for a full investigation of the electoral process.; President Trump has a luncheon with Republican senators in the White House, calling on them to work on repealing and replacing the Affordable Care Act.; President Trump hosts a "Made in America" roundtable event at the White House with CEOs of American companies, calling for a crackdown on counterfeit goods from overseas.; President Trump nominates Mark Esper as Secretary of the Army and Robert Wilkie as Undersecretary of Defense for Personnel and Readiness.	
Thursday, July 20	President Trump meets with his national security team at the Pentagon to discuss troop levels in Afghanistan and the fight against the Islamic State of Iraq and the Levant. The meeting is reportedly contentious and became the moment when Rex Tillerson decided to resign his position.; President Trump announces that $500 million will be made available for the production of domestic glass pharmaceutical packaging to representatives from Merck, Pfizer and Corning.	President Trump, Vice President Pence, and Defense Secretary Mattis at the Pentagon
Friday, July 21	President Trump signs an executive ordering a review of the U.S. defense industrial base and military supply chains.; President Trump appoints Anthony Scaramucci his new White House Communications Director.; White House Press Secretary Sean Spicer resigns, effective at the end of August.; President Trump honors surviving members of the USS USS Arizona (BB-39) during a visit to the White House.; H. R. McMaster dismisses Rich Higgins from the National Security Council following exposure of a memorandum, authored by Higgins, outlining a theory that the media, bankers, Islamists, cultural Marxists, and both political parties are plotting to destroy Trump's presidency.	Defense Secretary Jim Mattis with Pearl Harbor survivor Donald Stratton
Saturday, July 22	In a phone call to Ryan Lizza, the newly appointed Communications Director Anthony Scaramucci calls Chief of Staff Reince Priebus a "fucking paranoid schizophrenic" and notes that unlike Steve Bannon he is "not trying to suck my own cock".; President Trump commissions the aircraft carrier USS Gerald R. Ford (CVN-78) at Naval Station Norfolk, Virginia.	
Sunday, July 23		
Monday, July 24	President Trump calls AG Jeff Sessions "beleaguered".; The president calls Adam Schiff "sleazy" and "totally biased".; President Trump meets with families described by the White House as "victims" of the Affordable Care Act, holding a press conference urging senators to repeal and replace it.; President Trump attends the 2017 National Scout Jamboree at Glen Jean, West Virginia, praising the organization and its values. The Boy Scouts' chief executive issues a formal apology on July 27 for the speech's "political rhetoric".; Jared Kushner issues a statement at the White House denying all collusion with Russian officials, following a meeting with the Senate Intelligence Committee.	President Trump at the Boy Scouts National Jamboree
Tuesday, July 25	President Trump holds a bilateral meeting and joint press conference with Lebanese Prime Minister Saad Hariri at the White House to discuss the humanitarian problem in Syria, Hezbollah, and anti-terrorism.; President Trump promises more help to veterans during a private gathering of local veteran organizations at Struthers, Ohio, as part of American Heroes Week.; President Trump holds a campaign style rally in Youngstown, Ohio, touting the successes of his administration.	President Trump honors veteran Bob Bishop at the AMVETS Post 44 Salute to American Heroes
Wednesday, July 26	President Trump says, "The United States Government will not accept or allow ... transgender individuals to serve in any capacity in the U.S. Military," citing disruptions and medical costs.; The Trump administration begins to roll back a regulation expanding overtime pay to 4.2 million workers.; President Trump hosts the American Legion Boys Nation and the American Legion Auxiliary Girls Nation at the White House.; President Trump donates his second-quarter salary to the Department of Education.; President Trump announces a $10 billion investment by Chinese company Foxconn to build a manufacturing facility in Wisconsin, with a $3 billion subsidy.; President Trump nominates Kansas governor Sam Brownback as ambassador of the Office of International Religious Freedom.; The Justice Department files a legal brief on behalf of the United States arguing that the 1964 Civil Rights Act does not prohibit discrimination based on sexual orientation or, implicitly, gender identity.	President Trump and the American Legion Boys Nation
Thursday, July 27	Chief of Staff Reince Priebus resigns.; President Trump awards the Medal of Valor to five first responders for their actions in the shooting at a congressional baseball practice.; President Trump nominates six diplomatic ambassadors: John R. Bass for Afghanistan; Michael James Dodman for Mauritania; Peter Hoekstra for the Netherlands; Daniel Kritenbrink for Vietnam; Justin Hicks Siberell for Bahrain; and Michele Jeanne Sison for Haiti.; George Papadopoulos is arrested upon arrival at Washington Dulles International Airport.	Vice President Pence swears in Ambassador Hagerty
Friday, July 28	President Trump appoints John F. Kelly as White House Chief of Staff, replacing Reince Priebus.; President Trump addresses law enforcement officers at Suffolk County Community College calling for increased border security and a crackdown on transnational crime.	
Saturday, July 29	President Trump describes Republican Senators as looking like "fools" following a 49–51 vote against his initiative to repeal the Affordable Care Act.; President Trump threatens to end healthcare cost-sharing subsidies to insurers and lawmakers.	
Sunday, July 30		
Monday, July 31	John Kelly is sworn in as the White House Chief of Staff.; Anthony Scaramucci is removed as the White House Communications Director 16 days after taking office, following crude remarks made in an interview to The New Yorker.; Treasury Secretary Steve Mnuchin announces sanctions against Venezuelan President Nicolás Maduro.; President Trump awards the Medal of Honor at the White House to James McCloughan, a former army medic who served during the Vietnam War.; Press Secretary Sanders states her belief that President Trump was "joking", when asked about allegations that he promoted police brutality at a speech to law enforcement officers at Suffolk County Community College on July 28.	President Trump presents the Medal of Honor to Specialist Five James McCloughan

=== August 2017 ===
Date	Events	Photos/videos
Tuesday, August 1	President Trump, as part of 'American Dream Week', holds a small business owners event at the White House touting American growth.	Vice President Pence and Montenegrin Prime Minister Duško Marković
Wednesday, August 2	President Trump signs a Congressional bill (H.R.3364) limiting his ability to ease sanctions against Russia, despite describing the bill as "flawed" and "unconstitutional".; Secretary of State Rex Tillerson is reported as having not spent 60 million dollars available to combat Russian and Chinese disinformation.; President Trump's campaign team hands over 20,000 pages of documents to the Senate Judiciary Committee in relation to the ongoing investigations concerning Russian collusion with Trump's election campaign team.; The president is reported to have complained about NATO allies and asked how the US could exploit Afghanistan's mineral wealth.; Sam Clovis, the president's nominee to be the leading scientist at the United States Department of Agriculture, is reported to have run a blog calling progressives “race traders and race ‘traitors.’”; President Trump introduces a new bill entitled "The Raise Act" which proposes to replace the current permanent employment-immigration framework with a merit- and skill-based immigration system.; Ezra Cohen-Watnick, leader of the NSC's Intelligence directorate, is removed from his position.	President Trump with Senators Tom Cotton and David Perdue
Thursday, August 3	President Trump hosts a Veterans Affairs Telehealth Services event at the White House unveiling a new service for veterans allowing patients to schedule health care appointments from their smartphones or home computers.; President Trump attends a rally at Huntington, West Virginia, where Governor Jim Justice announces his switch from the Democrats to the Republicans.	President Trump and Secretary Shulkin unveil a new Telehealth service for veterans
Friday, August 4	President Trump and Vice President Pence visit the FEMA headquarters to review preparations and emergency responses for the upcoming hurricane season.; President Trump discusses in a phone conversation with French president Emmanuel Macron increased cooperation in Iraq, Syria and countering Iranian influence in the Middle East.; Attorney General Jeff Sessions announces a crackdown on individuals who leak classified or sensitive national security information, as well as a review of the way in which journalists are subpoenaed.	
Saturday, August 5		
Sunday, August 6	President Trump has a phone conversation with South Korean president Moon Jae-in, discussing ways to stop the North Korean nuclear program.; Secretary of State Tillerson attends the ASEAN summit in Manila to push its members and partners to apply more pressure on North Korea to halt its nuclear program.	Secretary Tillerson at the 10th Lower Mekong Initiative Ministerial Meeting
Monday, August 7	Secretary of State Tillerson meets with Philippines President Rodrigo Duterte to discuss global terrorism, economic cooperation and the security situation in Marawi.	Secretary Tillerson, Australian Foreign Minister Julie Bishop, and Japanese Foreign Minister Tarō Kōno in Manila, Philippines
Tuesday, August 8	President Trump warns North Korea of "fire and fury" following threats to retaliate against new United Nations sanctions.; Secretary of State Tillerson has discussions with Thai Prime Minister Prayut Chan-o-cha and Foreign Minister Don Pramudwinai on regional security and trade in Bangkok.; Secretary of State Tillerson meets with Malaysian prime minister Najib Razak in Kuala Lumpur to discuss international relations and trade.; President Trump holds a press briefing at Bedminster, New Jersey, calling for tougher enforcement to combat the opioid problem in the country.	
Wednesday, August 9	President Trump draws attention on Twitter to the "power" of the U.S. nuclear arsenal.; President Trump speaks by telephone with Senator Mitch McConnell; he complains that McConnell is not protecting him from the Senate's Russia inquiry.; Defense Secretary Mattis warns North Korea that an attack on the U.S. or its allies will prompt "the destruction of its people".	Defense Secretary Mattis with the crew of the submarine USS Kentucky (SSBN-737)
Thursday, August 10	President Trump talks to reporters about his "fire and fury" warning, stating that "if anything, maybe that statement wasn't tough enough."; President Trump declares that the opioid crisis is a national emergency that will need a lot of attention and money to combat.; President Trump states that he is "very thankful" that Vladimir Putin ordered removal of 755 diplomatic posts from Russia, reducing the U.S. payroll.	
Friday, August 11	President Trump states on Twitter that America's military capabilities against North Korea are "locked and loaded".; President Trump does not rule out the possibility of military action against President Nicolás Maduro in response to the ongoing Venezuelan political crisis.; President Trump retracts his statement thanking Vladimir Putin on August 10 and states that his original comment was sarcastic.; President Trump holds a workforce and apprenticeship discussion with Secretary of Education Betsy DeVos and Secretary of Labor Alex Acosta on ways to help Americans access affordable education and training which, according to a White spokesperson, will equip them with relevant skills to help them secure good jobs.	
Saturday, August 12	President Trump speaks to Chinese president Xi Jinping, who requests restraint concerning tensions in the Korean peninsula.; President Trump signs the Veterans Affairs Choice and Quality Employment Act, which will provide veterans private medical care using government funds for the next six months.; President Trump condemns the violence from all sides at a far-right rally in Charlottesville, Virginia, and calls for law and order to be restored. He notably opted to omit any mention of the murdered counter-protester Heather Heyer in his address; he also chose to not single out or specifically condemn the alt-right protester James Alex Fields for that murder, and to not condemn the neo-Nazi movement. Trump faced bipartisan criticism for these omissions.	
Sunday, August 13	Vice President Pence arrives in Colombia meeting with Colombian president Juan Manuel Santos to cover trade, business and investment opportunities in both countries.; Speaking in a press conference in Cartagena, Vice President Pence condemns neo-Nazism and the Ku Klux Klan, and rejects allegations that President Trump had failed to censure white supremacists explicitly in his previous remarks, saying the media has overblown the issue.; National Security Advisor McMaster denounces a fatal vehicular attack on counterprotesters in Charlottesville on August 12 as "terrorism".	Vice President Pence and Colombian President Juan Manuel Santos
Monday, August 14	President Trump again condemns the violence that took place at the rally in Charlottesville, Virginia.; President Trump signs an executive order authorizing U.S. Trade Representative Robert Lighthizer to begin investigations into Chinese trade practices that harm American businesses, with particular focus on intellectual property and advanced technology.; President Trump speaks by phone to Japanese prime minister Shinzo Abe on finding ways to prevent North Korea launching ballistic missiles at Guam across Japanese territory.; Attorney General Sessions decries the August 12 Charlottesville vehicle attack as "domestic terrorism".; The CEOs of Merck, Intel and Under Armour resign from the American Manufacturing Council in protest at President Trump's response to the Charlottesville rally.	President Trump condemns the violence at a Charlottesville rally
Tuesday, August 15	President Trump signs an executive order calling for federal departments to speed up the permits process for construction of transportation, water and other infrastructure projects. He revokes regulations intended to manage and prevent flooding.; President Trump holds a press conference at which he goes "off teleprompter" and reverts to his earlier apportioning of blame in Charlottesville, apparently equally, to both sides. At this same news conference he voices his personal support of the rationale of the Alt-right's claim that General Lee was a historical figure of similar historical importance to Lincoln, Washington and Jefferson, and that he therefore supported the Alt-Right's rationale for protesting against the removal of the Charlottesville statue of General Lee.; Scott Paul, president of the Alliance for American Manufacturing, and Richard Trumka, president of AFL–CIO, resign from the American Manufacturing Council. President Trump describes the resignees as "grandstanders".; Vice President Pence holds meetings with Argentinian president Mauricio Macri in Buenos Aires, focused on strengthening business ties between their two countries.	Vice President Pence and Argentine President Mauricio Macri at a joint press conference
Wednesday, August 16	President Trump appoints Hope Hicks as interim White House Communications Director, replacing Scaramucci.; After the fallout from Trump's handling of the Charlottesville protest, numerous members of President Trump's American Manufacturing Council announce their intention to resign from the council. President Trump announces the dissolution of the council and also of the Strategic and Policy Forum following the resignations of Inge Thulin, CEO of 3M, and Campbell's Soup Company CEO Denise Morrison.; President Trump signs a veterans' education bill to provide college assistance for military veterans and increase these payments if they complete science, technology and engineering courses.; In Santiago, Chile, Vice President Pence has a meeting with Chilean President Michelle Bachelet to build business ties between both countries and to call for Chile to break its diplomatic ties with North Korea.	Trump supporters at the National Mall
Thursday, August 17	President Trump condemns a fatal terrorist attack in Barcelona and offers Spain the full support of the United States.; President Trump scraps plans initiated by Executive Order on July 19 for the setup of an Advisory Council on Infrastructure.; President Trump holds meetings with the Small Business Administration chief Linda McMahon on finding ways to help small business who have difficulty getting loans and finding the right workers.; The White House announces a deal whereby the U.S. can resume exporting pork to Argentina, for the first time since 1992.; Vice President Pence has meetings with Panamanian president Juan Carlos Varela focusing on commercial and security ties, as well as tackling drug trafficking, illegal migration and money laundering, culminating with a tour of the Panama Canal.	Vice President Pence and Panamanian President Juan Carlos Varel
Friday, August 18	President Trump directs that the U.S. Cyber Command (USCYBERCOM) be elevated to the status of a Unified Combatant Command (UCC).; The White House announces that Chief Strategist Steve Bannon has left his position "by mutual agreement".; Numerous presidential advisors resign, among them pastor A. R. Bernard, Microsoft president Brad Smith, Mozilla chairwoman Mitchell Baker, Comcast executive vice president David L. Cohen and investor Carl Icahn.; 17 members of the White House arts and humanities advisory panel resign, delivering an open letter condemning President Trump for his "support of the hate groups and terrorists who killed and injured fellow Americans in Charlottesville".; President Trump signs the Global War on Terrorism War Memorial Act, authorizing construction of a memorial to U.S. servicemen who participated in the global war on terrorism.; President Trump holds a conference at Camp David with his national security team to discuss military options in Afghanistan.	President Trump at the signing of the Global War on Terrorism Memorial Act
Saturday, August 19	President Trump praises 30,000 protestors against a right-wing Free Speech Rally in Boston for "speaking out against bigotry and hate", and criticizes "anti-police agitators".	
Sunday, August 20		
Monday, August 21	President Trump gives an address in Fort Myer, Virginia, reaffirming military commitment to Afghanistan and disavowing Pakistan's sheltering the Taliban.; President Trump swears in New York Jets owner Woody Johnson, as Ambassador to the UK.; Seven members of the National Infrastructure Advisory Council send a letter of resignation to the White House, asserting that President Trump is paying "insufficient attention" to cyber-security threats to the nation's infrastructure.	President Trump holds a press conference in Fort Myer, Virginia
Tuesday, August 22	President Trump tours a U.S. Customs & Border Protection facility in Yuma, Arizona, meeting with Marines and border patrol agents, and inspecting border security technology and equipment.; President Trump holds a political rally in Phoenix, Arizona, reiterating his condemnation of the violence at Charlottesville, accusing the media of distorting coverage of his response, while commenting on his administration's achievements. He announces a willingness to shut down the federal government if Congress refuses to allocate funds for his Mexican wall policy.; U.S. ambassador to the United Nations, Nikki Haley, in a meeting with the International Atomic Energy Agency officials at Vienna, Austria, calls for the nuclear watchdog to inspect Iranian military sites to verify compliance with the 2015 nuclear deal.	President Trump, Chief of Staff Kelly, and Acting Commissioner McAleenan overview border wall prototypes
Wednesday, August 23	President Trump in a speech to the National Convention of the American Legion in Reno, Nevada, calls for Americans to unite and reiterates the themes of his campaign, including crime, terrorism, manufacturing and infrastructure.; The White House instructs the Pentagon to develop a policy on transgender service members, notably considering their individual combat deployability, and curtailing subsidies for medical treatment or operations.; President Trump signs the Veterans Appeals Improvement and Modernization bill intended to allow better options and transparency for veterans when appealing benefit claims.; Vice President Pence mentions in a speech to South Florida Venezuelans that the U.S. will use the full measure of its economic and diplomatic power to end political repression in Venezuela.; State Department science envoy Daniel Kammen resigns in protest at President Trump's response to the violence at Charlottesville on August 12.	President Trump delivers remarks to the American Legion
Thursday, August 24	President Trump speaks by telephone with Texas governor Greg Abbott and Louisiana governor John Bel Edwards regarding Hurricane Harvey, and pledges federal aid.; Secretary of Interior Zinke sends a draft report to President Trump on his findings and recommendations on national monuments.	
Friday, August 25	President Trump issues Presidential Memorandum for the Secretary of Defense and the Secretary of Homeland Security.; President Trump monitors the situation with Hurricane Harvey from Camp David, Maryland, and signs a disaster proclamation that will guarantee federal aid to the region affected.; President Trump issues a presidential pardon for Sheriff Joe Arpaio who was convicted of criminal contempt in a case involving his department's racial profiling policy, praising Arpaio's life work in protecting the public from crime and illegal immigration.; President Trump signs an executive order barring the U.S. financial system from any dealings in new bonds and stocks issued by the Venezuelan government and its state oil company.; Sebastian Gorka leaves his position as deputy assistant to the president.; U.S. ambassador to the UN Nikki Haley criticizes the United Nations Interim Force in Lebanon commander, Major General Michael Beary, for not tackling the flow of illegal arms to Hezbollah-dominated Southern Lebanon but does not provide proof to back up her claims.	
Saturday, August 26		
Sunday, August 27		
Monday, August 28	President Trump holds a bilateral meeting and joint press conference with Finnish President Sauli Niinistö at the White House to discuss terrorism, Afghanistan, Russia, the Baltic Sea and the Arctic.; President Trump signs an executive order to restore the flow of surplus military equipment to local and state police agencies.	President Trump and Finnish President Sauli Niinistö
Tuesday, August 29	President Trump and First Lady Melania Trump arrive in Corpus Christi, Texas, to meet with Texas governor Greg Abbott, Texas senators Ted Cruz and John Cornyn, and FEMA Administrator Brock Long to discuss Hurricane Harvey. Trump later travels to the Texas Department of Public Safety's Emergency Operations Center in Austin, Texas, for further briefing.; President Trump said in a statement that "all options are on the table", after North Korea conducts a mid-range missile launch which flies over Northern Japan.; President Trump, in a phone call with Singaporean prime minister Lee Hsien Loong, accepts Singapore's offer of the use of its Texas-based Chinook helicopters to assist in Hurricane Harvey disaster-relief efforts.	President Trump with Senators John Cornyn and Ted Cruz
Wednesday, August 30	President Trump gives a speech in Springfield, Missouri, calling for tax reform.; President Trump posts on Twitter that the U.S. has been paying North Korea "extortion money" and that "talking is not the answer".; Vice President Pence in a speech to the West Virginia Chamber of Commerce's annual business summit called for tax overhaul reform, describing the current tax system as deleterious to employment and entrepreneurialism.	President Trump in Springfield, Missouri
Thursday, August 31	The Trump administration announces a cut of 90% to the Affordable Care Act's advertising budget.; Vice President Pence arrives in Corpus Christi, Texas, to survey the damage caused by Hurricane Harvey and meet with people affected by the storm.; Energy Secretary Rick Perry authorizes the Strategic Petroleum Reserve to release oil supplies to combat fuel price spikes, due to the shutdown of oil refineries in Texas which were affected by Hurricane Harvey.; President Trump will donate $1 million of his own funds to recovery efforts in Texas according to the White House.	

=== September 2017 ===
Date	Events	Photos/videos
Friday, September 1	President Trump signs a declaration designating September 3, 2017, as a "Day of Prayer" for victims of Hurricane Harvey.; The Department of Justice in a court filing makes its first official confirmation that neither it nor the FBI have evidence to support President Trump's allegation that then-President Obama wiretapped Trump Tower in New York.; President Trump nominates Richard Grenell as United States ambassador to Germany. If confirmed by the Senate, Grenell would be the Trump administration's first openly gay appointee.	
Saturday, September 2	President Trump and First Lady Melania Trump meet with and help to distribute food and supplies to victims of Hurricane Harvey at the NRG Center in Houston, Texas.; President Trump meets and thanks members of the Louisiana National Guard and the Cajun Navy at Lake Charles, Louisiana, who helped rescued people from the Hurricane Harvey floods.; Press Secretary Sanders denies a report that Director of Oval Office Operations Keith Schiller intends to resign.	President Trump and First Lady Melania Trump in Houston, Texas
Sunday, September 3	Following the latest North Korean nuclear test, President Trump and Treasury Secretary Mnuchin raise the possibility of ceasing trade with countries trading with North Korea.; Defense Secretary Mattis publicly states: "We are not looking to the total annihilation of a country, namely North Korea, but [...] we have many options to do so".	
Monday, September 4	In an emergency UN Security Council meeting, Ambassador Nikki Haley says the U.S. will present a new sanctions resolution to punish North Korea for the latest nuclear test.	
Tuesday, September 5	Attorney General Sessions announces at a special briefing that, at President Trump's order, the Department of Homeland Security will immediately cease to accept applications to the Deferred Action for Childhood Arrivals program. It is confirmed that current DACA recipients will be unaffected until March 5, 2018. Trump shortly thereafter calls on Congress to "legalize DACA".; In response to the North Korea threat, President Trump states that he will allow South Korea and Japan to purchase additional sophisticated military equipment from the U.S.; In a phone conversation, President Trump and Australian prime minister Malcolm Turnbull agree on the need for the international community to exert maximum diplomatic and economic pressure on North Korea.; President Trump holds a tax summit at the White House with his top advisors and Republican leaders to discuss reforming the U.S. tax system.; The head of the Hispanic Chamber of Commerce, Javier Palomarez, resigns from Trump's National Diversity Council in protest at the DACA announcement.	
Wednesday, September 6	President Trump meets with Congressional leaders from both parties to discuss disaster relief for the aftermath of Hurricane Harvey, raising the debt ceiling to prevent a government shutdown and federal spending legislation.; President Trump declares emergencies in Florida, Puerto Rico and the U.S. Virgin Islands for Hurricane Irma, instructing the Department of Homeland Security and the Federal Emergency Management Agency to coordinate disaster relief efforts.; At an oil refinery at Mandan, North Dakota, President Trump speaks to a friendly crowd calling for the restoration of American competitive edge, using tax cuts and reform.	President Trump in Mandan, North Dakota
Thursday, September 7	President Trump holds a bilateral meeting with Emir Sabah Al-Ahmad Al-Jaber Al-Sabah of Kuwait at the White House regarding developing economic, financial, and commercial ties between both countries.; President Trump talks to officials led by Governor Andrew Cuomo of New York and Governor Chris Christie of New Jersey about the Gateway Tunnel project as part of the administration's avowed priority on modernizing the nation's infrastructure.; President Trump approves South Carolina's request for an emergency declaration in the state in preparation for Hurricane Irma.; Secretary of Education Betsy DeVos confirms that there will be rollback of the college campus sexual assault directives or Title IX guidelines put in place during the Obama administration, asserting that the system has failed sexual assault survivors and those wrongly accused.; The Justice Department files a legal brief in the Supreme Court, arguing for a constitutional right of businesses to discriminate on the basis of sexual orientation and, implicitly, gender identity.	President Trump and Emir Sabah Al-Ahmad Al-Jaber Al-Sabah of Kuwait
Friday, September 8	President Trump speaks by phone to Saudi Arabia's crown prince Mohammed bin Salman Al Saud, the United Arab Emirate's crown prince Mohammed bin Zayed Al Nahyan and Qatar's Emir Tamim bin Hamad Al Thani concerning regional stability.; President Trump signs a disaster $15.25 billion relief bill for Hurricane Harvey and Irma, which includes raising the federal debt ceiling for the next three months.	President Trump signs the Hurricane Harvey relief bill at Camp David
Saturday, September 9	At Camp David, President Trump and his cabinet hold team-building sessions, hurricane briefings and strategy meetings, with special focus on Hurricane Irma and tax reform.; President Trump speaks by phone to Turkish president Recep Tayyip Erdoğan, agreeing to further strengthen bilateral relations and increase stability in the Middle East.	
Sunday, September 10	President Trump approves a disaster declaration for Florida which will authorize federal funding for areas affected by Hurricane Irma and will reimburse local and the state authorities for costs of response and recovery.; During a visit to FEMA headquarters in Washington, Vice President Pence made assurances that the federal assistance was on its way to help the people of Florida recover from the effects of Hurricane Irma.	
Monday, September 11	President Trump and First Lady Melania Trump lay a wreath at the September 11 Memorial at the Pentagon, and later pay tribute to the nearly three thousand Americans killed that day, pledging to continue to confront radical Islamic terrorism.	President Trump speaks at the Pentagon on the 16th anniversary of 9/11
Tuesday, September 12	President Trump holds a bilateral meeting with Malaysian Prime Minister Najib Razak at the White House focusing on trade, Islamic terrorism and Malaysian interest in Trump's infrastructure program.; President Trump holds a dinner with a group of bipartisan senators at the White House to discuss tax reform.; It is reported that Trump's team has for the first time submitted documents to Special Counsel Robert Mueller.	President Trump and Malaysian Prime Minister Najib Razak
Wednesday, September 13	President Trump declares September 15 – October 15 as National Hispanic Heritage Month.; President Trump hosts a bipartisan dinner at the White House to discuss tax reform and find ways to come up with legislation dealing with DACA recipients.; Daniel Craig withdraws from Trump's nomination to be deputy administrator of FEMA.	
Thursday, September 14	President Trump and Vice President Pence travel to Fort Myers, Florida, to be briefed on Hurricane Irma relief efforts with state and federal leaders, while praising first responders and local officials for their work and lives saved.; President Trump, Vice President Pence and First Lady Melania Trump help to distribute food and supplies to survivors of Hurricane Irma in Naples, Florida.; President Trump reiterates his argument that both sides at the rally in Charlottesville were at fault, prior to signing a Congressional resolution condemning White nationalists, White supremacists, the Ku Klux Klan, neo-Nazis and other hate groups.; President Trump and First Lady Melania Trump host a White House dinner reception for the White House Historical Association whose mission to protect, preserve, and provide public access to the history of the White House.	President Trump and First Lady Melania Trump in Fort Myers, Florida
Friday, September 15	Nikki Haley and Secretary of Defense James Mattis give statements on North Korea, Mattis saying the U.S. has options to use against North Korea if sanctions do not work.; Vice President Pence's press secretary Marc Lotter announces his departure from the White House.; President Trump in a phone call to Jewish leaders and rabbis reaffirms the administration's strong support for Israel and honors the upcoming celebration of High Holy Days such as Yom Kippur and Rosh Hashana.; President Trump and First Lady Melania Trump meet with military families and watch an air show at Andrew Airforce Base, with the President honoring the resolve of the nation's Air Force and warning foes and international terrorist groups that the U.S. military would respond to any threats.; Defense Secretary Jim Mattis meets with his Mexican counterparts in Mexico City to reinforce military ties and take part in commemorations of Mexico's independence day.	
Saturday, September 16		
Sunday, September 17	President Trump, in a phone call to South Korean president Moon Jae-in, pledges to impose stronger sanctions on North Korea to counter its missile and nuclear programs.	
Monday, September 18	President Trump attends the "Reforming the United Nations: Management, Security, and Development" forum at the United Nations, calling on members to pay more for joint projects such as peacekeeping missions.; President Trump holds a bilateral meeting with Israeli prime minister Benjamin Netanyahu to discuss a possible future peace deal between the Israelis and Palestinians, and alleged Iranian aggression in the Middle East.; President Trump holds a bilateral meeting with French president Emmanuel Macron to discuss the Paris Climate Change Agreement and the Iran nuclear deal.; President Trump has dinner meeting with Latin American leaders such as Brazilian president Michel Temer, Colombian president Juan Manuel Santos, Panamanian president Juan Carlos Varela and Argentinian vice president Gabriela Michetti to discuss the restoration of democracy in Venezuela.; Vice President Pence appoints Alyssa Farah as his press secretary, replacing Marc Lotter.	President Trump and Brazilian President Michel Temer
Tuesday, September 19	In his maiden speech to the United Nations General Assembly, President Trump announces that if Kim Jong-un, dubbed "Rocket Man", forces the United States to defend itself or its allies, the United States will "totally destroy" North Korea. Trump also indicates the possibility of further action against Venezuelan President Maduro's regime, denounces Iran as a "corrupt dictatorship", and describes the Iranian nuclear deal as an "embarrassment". He calls on the UN to work together to solve such issues.; President Trump attends a lunch meeting hosted by UN Secretary General António Guterres, seated with the leaders of Japan, South Korea, Turkey, and others. (Note: Trump sat at the same table as Japanese prime minister Shinzō Abe, Swiss president Doris Leuthard, Ecuadorian president Lenín Moreno, South Korean president Moon Jae-in, King Abdullah II of Jordan, Liberian president Ellen Johnson-Sirleaf, Turkish president Recep Tayyip Erdoğan, Lithuanian president Dalia Grybauskaitė, and Guinean president Alpha Conde.); President Trump holds a bilateral meeting with Qatari Emir Tamim bin Hamad Al Thani to discuss solving the dispute between Qatar and the Arab states.	President Trump addresses the 72nd session of the United Nations General Assembly
Wednesday, September 20	President Trump holds a bilateral meeting with King Abdullah II of Jordan to discuss fighting terrorism in the Middle East and praises Jordan for taking refugees from Syria.; President Trump holds a bilateral meeting with Palestinian president Mahmoud Abbas, promises to work on a peace deal between the Israelis and Palestinians.; President Trump hosts a working lunch with African Union leader Alpha Conde and leaders from Nigeria, Côte d'Ivoire, Ethiopia, Ghana, Guinea, Namibia, Senegal, Uganda and South Africa, discussing economic opportunities in the African continent and the security situation South Sudan and Congo.; President Trump holds a bilateral meeting with British prime minister Theresa May to discuss trade, North Korea, and Iran.; President Trump holds a bilateral meeting with Egyptian president Abdel Fattah el-Sisi and mentions he was considering the resumption of the foreign military aid to Egypt which was frozen over concerns of its human rights record.; Long-time aide and confidant to President Trump Keith Schiller leaves his position as the director of Oval Office operations.	
Thursday, September 21	President Trump holds a bilateral meeting with Afghan president Ashraf Ghani to discuss the Afghanistan war strategy in combating Islamist terrorists.; President Trump holds a bilateral meeting with Ukrainian president Petro Poroshenko to discuss issues such as trade between both countries and the security situation in Ukraine.; President Trump signs an executive order targeting individuals and companies trading with North Korea, including sanctions on foreign banks.; President Trump holds a bilateral meeting with South Korean president Moon Jae-in to discuss recent provocations by North Korea.; President Trump holds a bilateral meeting with Japanese prime minister Shinzō Abe and agree on their support for UN sanctions on North Korea.; President Trump holds a bilateral meeting with Turkish president Recep Tayyip Erdoğan to discuss regional developments such as the Russian sale of S-400 missile system to Turkey and Northern Iraqi Kurdish independence referendum.; The White House instructs the Environment Protection Agency to begin ordering employees to attend anti-leaking class to reinforce their compliance with laws and rules against leaking classified or sensitive government information to the media or outside parties.	
Friday, September 22	President Trump attends a political rally in Huntsville, Alabama, in support of the election campaign of Luther Strange.; Vice President Pence discusses the administration's efforts in tax reform in front of a crowd at the Flagship Enterprise Center, Anderson, Indiana.; Secretary of Education Betsy DeVos rescinds the previous administration's guidelines for colleges and universities in handling sexual misconduct claims under Title IX and introduced new guidelines in reporting these claims.	
Saturday, September 23	In response to a tweet by President Trump withdrawing an invitation to NBA player Stephen Curry to visit the White House, the entire Golden State Warrior team says it will forego the traditional championship team Oval office visit.	
Sunday, September 24	President Trump signs a new presidential proclamation introducing new travel restrictions on countries North Korea, Venezuela, and Chad along with countries Somalia, Yemen, Syria, Libya and Iran listed under Executive Order 13780.	
Monday, September 25	President Trump signs a presidential memorandum directing the Department of Education to allocate at least $200 million per year in grant funds to the study of science and engineering.; President Trump hosts a dinner with the several conservative grassroot leaders at the White House to discuss tax reform.; Vice President Pence visits the Marshall Space Flight Center in Huntsville, Alabama.; Vice President Pence attends a campaign rally in support of Luther Strange in a special Republican runoff election.	
Tuesday, September 26	President Trump meets with a bipartisan group of members of House Ways and Means Committee to discuss tax reform and tax cuts.; President Trump attends a briefing on damage caused Hurricane Maria on the island of Puerto Rico, promising to visit the island and send more aid.; President Trump holds a bilateral meeting and joint press conference with Spanish Prime Minister Mariano Rajoy at the White House to discuss both countries commitments in combating terrorism, the situations with North Korea and Venezuela and their opposition to Catalonia's independence from Spain.; President Trump headlines an RNC fundraiser in New York City.; A third attempt at a Senate vote on President Trump's initiative to repeal the Affordable Care Act is abandoned.; Defense Secretary James Mattis meets with Indian defence minister Nirmala Sitharaman in New Delhi to discuss defense, trade and technology.; Chuck Rosenberg, acting administrator of the Drug Enforcement Administration, announces his resignation effective October 1.	President Trump and Spanish Prime Minister Mariano Rajoy
Wednesday, September 27	President Trump discusses his plan to reform the tax system in Indianapolis, Indiana calling for the sweeping tax cuts, reducing the personal income tax brackets and corporate taxes and eliminating the estate tax.; Defense Secretary James Mattis arrives in Kabul, Afghanistan with NATO Secretary General Jens Stoltenberg to meet with Afghan president Ashraf Ghani and discuss the security situation in the country and combating the Taliban.	President Trump walks onto the stage in Indianapolis, Indiana
Thursday, September 28	President Trump attends the celebration for the 70th anniversary of the National Security Council at the Eisenhower Executive Office Building.; President Trump meets Chinese Vice-Premier Liu Yandong to discuss Trump's visit to China and international cooperation between both countries.; Vice President Pence speaks to a crowd in a factory at Auburn Hills, Michigan touting the administration's tax reform proposal.; President Trump has picked Texas Supreme Court Justice Don Willett and former Texas Solicitor General James Ho as nominees for the Fifth Circuit Court of Appeals.; It is reported that the White House is conducting an investigation into the use of private email accounts by senior members of the administration, including Jared Kushner, for official business.	Secretary Tillerson and Secretary DeVos with Chinese Vice Premier Liu Yandong
Friday, September 29	President Trump speaks to the National Association of Manufacturers about the economy and his tax plan.; Secretary of Health and Human Services Tom Price resigns from his position after reports of criticism over extensive use of private jets, with President Trump naming Don J. Wright, a deputy assistant secretary of health, to serve as acting secretary.	Vice President Pence receives a briefing on Hurricane Maria
Saturday, September 30	Secretary of State Rex Tillerson meets with Chinese president Xi Jinping in Beijing, China to discuss bilateral relations between both countries and President Trump's upcoming visit to China in November.	

== See also ==
- First 100 days of the first Trump presidency – Period from January to April 2017
- List of executive actions by Donald Trump
- Lists of presidential trips made by Donald Trump (international trips)
- First presidential transition of Donald Trump – Transfer of presidential power from Barack Obama to Donald Trump
- Timeline of the 2016 United States presidential election

== Notes ==
U.S. presidential administration timelines
Preceded by Trump presidency (2017 Q2)	Trump presidency (2017 Q3)	Succeeded by Trump presidency (2017 Q4)
