= Timeline of the first Trump presidency (2017 Q4) =

The following is a timeline of the first presidency of Donald Trump during the fourth and last quarter of 2017, from October 1 to December 31, 2017. For a complete itinerary of his travels, see List of presidential trips made by Donald Trump (2017). To navigate between quarters, see timeline of the Donald Trump presidencies.

== Overview ==
=== Economy ===
In the final quarter of 2017, the real U.S. gross domestic product (GDP) increased at an annual rate of 2.9%. The growth rate was primarily due to positive contributions from personal consumption expenditures (PCE), nonresidential fixed investment, exports, residential fixed investment, state and local government spending, and federal government spending.

=== Public opinion ===
According to Five Thirty-Eight, President Trump's average public approval rating on December 31, 2017, stood at 37.9%, representing a quarterly decline of 0.7 percentage points, and a decline of 7.6 percentage points since his inauguration on January 20, 2017.

== Timeline ==
=== October 2017 ===
Date	Events	Photos/videos
Sunday, October 1	The deadline passes unfulfilled for President Trump to identify for punishment Kremlin-linked targets of sanctions signed on August 2.	
Monday, October 2	President Trump addresses the nation in regards to the mass shooting in Las Vegas, offering his condolences to the victims and their families while praising the first responders at the scene.; President Trump meets with the governors of Maine, Mississippi, Kentucky and New Hampshire at the White House to discuss cutting federal regulations.; President Trump holds a bilateral meeting with Thai Prime Minister Prayut Chan-o-cha at the White House to discuss improving trade relations.; President Trump has dinner with Republican members of Congress at the White House to discuss immigration reform and improving border security.	President Trump addresses the nation following the Las Vegas mass shooting
Tuesday, October 3	President Trump meets with U.S. Virgin Islands Governor Kenneth Mapp on board the USS Kearsarge (LHD-3) to discuss the territory's immediate funding needs in the aftermath of Hurricane Maria.; President Trump and First Lady Melania Trump attend a briefing in San Juan, Puerto Rico, with senior military personnel and government officials, including Governor Ricardo Rosselló, on hurricane recovery efforts.; Vice President Pence meets with representatives of local businesses, community leaders, families and Arizona Governor Doug Ducey in Phoenix, Arizona, to discuss efforts for tax reform.	President Trump greets soldiers stationed on board the USS Kearsarge (LHD-3)
Wednesday, October 4	Secretary of State Rex Tillerson states the administration is preparing for options ahead of the October 15, 2017, deadline on whether Iran is complying with the 2015 nuclear accord.; President Trump and First Lady Melania Trump visit victims of the Las Vegas mass shooting at University Medical Center and the first responders who dealt with the shooter.; It is reported that UN Ambassador Nikki Haley has been formally reprimanded for violating the Hatch Act.	President Trump and First Lady Melania Trump meet Las Vegas shooting victim Tiffany Huizar
Thursday, October 5	President Trump has a briefing and dinner with senior military leaders at the White House to discuss the current situation with Iran and North Korea.; Vice President Pence holds a meeting of the National Space Council with several White House officials and space industry executives focusing on moving away from the current outsourcing of manned launches and building a foundation to send Americans to Mars.; The United States Department of Justice reversed an Obama-era policy that explicitly defines transgender workers as protected under employment discrimination laws due to what qualifies as employment discrimination under Title VII of the Civil Rights Act.	
Friday, October 6	President Trump celebrates Hispanic Heritage Month at the White House, and speaks of recovery efforts in Puerto Rico and of the people suffering under the governments of Cuba and Venezuela.; President Trump signs a proclamation honoring October 6 as the National day of Manufacturing, stating that jobs are coming back to the United States with the creation of thousands of new manufacturing jobs.; President Trump approves an emergency declaration that will allow federal resources to supplement local efforts and allow FEMA to coordinate disaster relief efforts in Louisiana in preparation for Hurricane Nate.	President Trump and First Lady Melania Trump commemorate Hispanic Heritage Month
Saturday, October 7	Vice President Pence attends a unity prayer walk with Las Vegas mayor Carolyn Goodman and local officials in memory of the people killed and wounded during the Las Vegas mass shooting.; President Trump attends a fundraiser in Greensboro, North Carolina, to raise funds for his reelection campaign and the Republican National Committee.	Vice President Pence and the Second Lady lay flowers at a memorial in Las Vegas
Sunday, October 8	At President Trump's prior request, Vice President Pence walks out of an NFL football game after fifteen 49er players kneel during the national anthem. The White House says it "will not dignify any event that disrespects our soldiers, our flag, or our national anthem".	Vice President Pence stands for the national anthem prior to leaving an NFL game
Monday, October 9	Vice President Pence holds a fundraiser at Newport Beach, California, to raise funds for Republican Congressmen and to promote the administration's tax-cut initiative.	
Tuesday, October 10	President Trump meets with former Secretary of State Henry Kissinger at the White House, seeking his advice on dealing with North Korea and China.; President Trump hosts five-time winners of the Stanley Cup, the Pittsburgh Penguins, at the White House.; President Trump approves a federal disaster declaration for California in response to the Californian wildfires that will provide funding to state, local and tribal governments to help fight the fires and rebuild.; Vice President Pence visits the California Office of Emergency Services at Sacramento, California, to be briefed on operations on battling the Californian wildfires.	
Wednesday, October 11	President Trump holds a bilateral meeting with Canadian Prime Minister Justin Trudeau at the White House to discuss NAFTA and U.S.–Canadian trade possibilities.; President Trump holds a campaign rally at the Harrisburg International Airport in Harrisburg, Pennsylvania, at which he promotes his tax-cut initiative.	President Trump and Canadian Prime Minister Justin Trudeau
Thursday, October 12	President Trump signs an executive order which directs cabinet agencies to develop rules that would expand access to less expensive, less comprehensive insurance policies with fewer benefits and fewer protections for consumers than those mandated under the Patient Protection and Affordable Care Act.; President Trump nominates Kirstjen Nielsen as the next Secretary of Homeland Security, who will replace John Kelly.; The administration announces that the U.S. will withdraw from UNESCO, citing an "anti-Israel bias".	President Trump signs an executive order on healthcare
Friday, October 13	President Trump attends the Values Voter Summit in Washington D.C. to speak on matters such as easing of enforcement of the Johnson Amendment and weakening the contraception mandate in the Affordable Care Act.; President Trump announces at the White House that he will not certify the Iranian nuclear deal, while giving Congress time to come up with tougher requirements to certify compliance of the deal and imposing sanctions Islamic Revolutionary Guard Corps.; President Trump and First Lady Melania Trump visit the Secret Service James J. Rowley Training Center at Beltsville, Maryland, to inspect training procedures and equipment.	President Trump Delivers Remarks on the Iran Strategy
Saturday, October 14		
Sunday, October 15	President Trump's 2020 re-election campaign files its quarterly finance report with the FEC. The filing discloses a legal bill of $1.1m paid from campaign funds in connection with the Russia investigations.	
Monday, October 16	President Trump attends a rally in Greenville, South Carolina, in support of Governor Henry McMaster to raise funds for his gubernatorial campaign.; President Trump has a working lunch with Senate Majority Leader Mitch McConnell and Vice President Pence to discuss legislative issues such as the budget, tax reform and immigration.; Responding to questions at the White House, President Trump makes his first public comments on the four Special Forces soldiers killed in a suspected ISIS ambush on October 4 and further comments on former presidents calls and letters to the families of slain American troops during their time in office.	
Tuesday, October 17	President Trump holds a bilateral meeting and joint press conference with Greek Prime Minister Alexis Tsipras at the White House to discuss Greek efforts to reform their economy and military ties between both countries.; President Trump holds a Diwali celebration at the White House.; Vice President Pence attends a small business gathering in Lancaster, New York, to discuss the administration's tax reform efforts.; Trump's nominee to lead the White House Office of National Drug Control Policy, Tom Marino, withdraws his nomination following news reports that Marino had previously worked on behalf of the pharmaceutical industry.	President Trump and Greek Prime Minister Alexis Tsipras
Wednesday, October 18	President Trump holds a meeting at the White House with the Senate Finance Committee to discuss tax reform.; President Trump holds a phone conversation with Iowa Governor Kim Reynolds to discuss concerns about the administration's biofuels policy.; The latest version of President Trump's travel ban is blocked by U.S. District Judge Derrick Watson shortly before it comes into effect.	
Thursday, October 19	President Trump meets with Puerto Rico Governor Ricardo Rosselló at the White House to discuss the island's recovery efforts after Hurricane Maria.; President Trump attends a gala dinner at the Kuwaiti Embassy, where the Kuwait–American Foundation is trying to raise money for the United Nations High Commissioner for Refugees and to honor First Lady Melania Trump for her dedication to causes affecting women and children in the U.S. and abroad.; President Trump nominates Joseph J. Simons, an anti-trust lawyer to head the Federal Trade Commission, including Noah Phillips, chief counsel for Senator John Cornyn and Rohit Chopra, a consumer advocate to fill the remaining two seats at the Commission.	
Friday, October 20	President Trump holds a bilateral meeting with United Nations Secretary-General António Guterres at the White House to discuss counter-terrorism, Korea and the Middle East.; The Smithsonian Museum displays First Lady Melania Trump's ballgown from her husband's inauguration.	
Saturday, October 21		
Sunday, October 22	President Trump holds a conference call with Republican Congressman calling on them to pass the Senate budget and work on tax reform.; Secretary of State Rex Tillerson attends a co-operation council in Riyadh, Saudi Arabia, attended by Saudi Arabia and Iraq, where he calls on Iran to remove its paramilitary forces from Iraqi territory.; Secretary of State Rex Tillerson holds meetings with Qatari Foreign Minister Mohammed bin Abdulrahman Al Thani in Doha, Qatar to find ways to resolve the diplomatic crisis between Qatar and other Gulf states.	Secretary Tillerson greets Saudi King Salman following the Saudi Arabia–Iraq Coordination Committee Meeting
Monday, October 23	President Trump holds a bilateral meeting with Singaporean Prime Minister Lee Hsien Loong at the White House to discuss the North Korean nuclear threat, defence and economic relationship between both countries, whilst overseeing the signing ceremony between Singapore Airlines and Boeing for $13.8 billion worth of new planes.; President Trump holds a Medal of Honor ceremony at the White House for Captain Gary Michael Rose who was wounded in combat during Operation Tailwind in the Vietnam War.; Secretary of State Rex Tillerson holds meetings in Kabul, Afghanistan with Afghan president Ashraf Ghani and his officials on discussing strategies on ending the conflict in the country.	President Trump and Singaporean Prime Minister Lee Hsien Loong
Tuesday, October 24	President Trump holds an awards ceremony at the White House as part of National Minority Enterprise Development Week.; President Trump holds a swearing-in ceremony at the Oval Office for the next Ambassador to the Vatican Callista Gingrich.; President Trump meets with Republican Senators at the Capitol to call for unity within the party and to discuss tax reform.; Secretary of State Rex Tillerson holds meetings in Islamabad, Pakistan, with Pakistani prime minister Shahid Khaqan Abbasi, concerning the combating of extremist fighters.	President Trump greets Ambassador Callista Gingrich and Newt Gingrich at the White House
Wednesday, October 25	President Trump attends a briefing in Dallas, Texas on the recovery efforts by Hurricane Harvey and addressing the long-term flood mitigation plans in the state.; President Trump holds a fundraiser to raise funds for his re-election campaign and the Republican National Committee, while holding a discussion round-table with his supporters at the Belo Mansion in Dallas.; Secretary of State Rex Tillerson holds meetings with Indian prime minister Narendra Modi in New Delhi to discuss bilateral trade and defense.; U.S. Ambassador to the United Nations Nikki Haley in a meeting with South Sudanese president Salva Kiir in Juba, South Sudan, calls on the president to find ways to end the conflict in the country.	
Thursday, October 26	President Trump signs a presidential memorandum declaring a nationwide public health emergency and ordering all federal agencies to take measures to reduce the number of opioid deaths in the country. No funds are allocated from the public health emergency fund.	
Friday, October 27		
Saturday, October 28		
Sunday, October 29		
Monday, October 30	Shortly following the surrender of former Trump campaign officials Paul Manafort and Rick Gates to the FBI on twelve charges of conspiracy and money laundering between 2006 and 2015, President Trump states on Twitter that the charges refer to events from "years ago" and that "there is NO COLLUSION!"; Following the announcement of a guilty plea from George Papadopolous concerning lying to the FBI about meetings with Russians in 2016, Press Secretary Sanders describes Papadopoulos having held a 'limited', 'volunteer' position in the Trump campaign. Sanders contradicts Mueller's indictment which details that Papadopoulos was encouraged to meet with Russian officials by a high-ranking Trump campaign official, named as Sam Clovis by The Washington Post.; The enforcement of President Trump's ban on transgender soldiers is blocked by U.S. District Judge Colleen Kollar-Kotelly, stating that the president's given reasons "do not appear to be supported by any facts".; President Trump and First Lady Melania Trump participate in the White House Halloween event.	President Trump and First Lady Melania Trump greet trick-or-treaters during the White House Halloween event
Tuesday, October 31	Following a fatal vehicular attack in New York City by an Islamic extremist, President Trump offers "condolences and prayers" to the victims and their families.; President Trump describes former foreign policy aide George Papadopoulos as a "young, low level volunteer" and a "liar".; Trump's lawyer Jay Sekulow tells ABC News that presidential pardons for Manafort, Gates and Papadopoulos are "not on the table".; President Trump releases his presidential portrait, taken by Chief Official White House Photographer Shealah Craighead.	

=== November 2017 ===
Date	Events	Photos/videos
Wednesday, November 1		
Thursday, November 2	House Republicans publish their forthcoming tax bill, Tax Cuts and Jobs Act of 2017, with President Trump's provisional approval.; President Trump repeats his demand for the execution of Sayfullo Saipov, the suspect in the case of the 2017 New York City vehicular attack.; President Trump nominates Jerome Powell to be Chair of the Federal Reserve.; Sam Clovis withdraws his nomination to serve as USDA's chief scientist.	President Trump announces nomination for Jerome Powell to be Chair of the Federal Reserve
Friday, November 3	President Trump leaves Washington for Hawaii prior to his five-nation tour of Asia.	President Trump greets troops during a visit to Hawaii
Saturday, November 4		
Sunday, November 5	President Trump arrives in Tokyo, Japan during his first leg of five-nation tour of Asia.; President Trump meets with Japanese prime minister Shinzō Abe at Kasumigaseki Country Club.; President Trump sends his condolences to the Texan community of Sutherland Springs following the deadliest mass shooting at an American church.	President Trump and Japanese Prime Minister Shinzō Abe at Kasumigaseki Country Club
Monday, November 6	President Trump meets with Emperor Akihito and Empress Michiko at the Tokyo Imperial Palace.; President Trump holds a joint press conference with Japanese prime minister Shinzō Abe at the Akasaka Palace to discuss new arms sales to Japan and encourages the country to shoot down North Korean missiles.; Commerce Secretary Wilbur Ross denies hiding his large stake in a shipping company which has business ties to the Putin family, following the release of the Paradise Papers.	President Trump and Japanese Prime Minister Shinzō Abe at the Akasaka Palace
Tuesday, November 7	President Trump arrives in Seoul, South Korea during his second leg of five-nation tour of Asia.; President Trump visits U.S. and South Korean troops at Camp Humphreys.; President Trump holds a joint press conference with South Korean president Moon Jae-in at the Blue House.; At a press conference in South Korea, President Trump announces that he "hoped to God" not to have to use military force against North Korea, and urges Kim Jong-un to negotiate.; President Trump tweets his support for Republican candidate Ed Gillespie and attacks Democratic candidate Ralph Northam in advance of the election of a new Governor of Virginia. Northam wins.	President Trump and South Korean President Moon Jae-in at the Blue House
Wednesday, November 8	President Trump addressed the National Assembly of South Korea.; President Trump laid a wreath at the Seoul National Cemetery to honor the victims of the Korean War.; President Trump arrives in Beijing, China during his third leg of five-nation tour of Asia.; President Trump made state visit to China and meets with Xi Jinping, the General Secretary of the Chinese Communist Party, at the Forbidden City.; Former Senior Adviser to the president, Carl Icahn, is subpoenaed for information related to his work on biofuels policy while a part of the administration.	President Trump and Chinese President Xi Jinping at the Forbidden City
Thursday, November 9	President Trump signs a number of binding and non-binding gas, aviation, communications and food-crop deals with Chinese president Xi Jinping. Speaking alongside President Xi Jinping in Beijing, President Trump refers to the U.S.-Chinese trade imbalance, praising China for "taking advantage" of prior U.S. administrations.; President Trump holds a joint press conference with Chinese president Xi Jinping at the Great Hall of the People.; The State Department rejects an essay released by Ambassador Barbara Stephenson, which claims that the continuing depletion of State officials under the Trump administration will "forfeit the game to our adversaries".	President Trump and Chinese President Xi Jinping at the Great Hall of the People
Friday, November 10	President Trump arrives Saturday morning UTC+7 in Da Nang, Vietnam during his fourth leg of five-nation tour of Asia.; In a speech to delegates, President Trump talks of "chronic trade abuses", and of Kim Jong-un's "twisted fantasies of [...] nuclear blackmail", urging Russia and China to place pressure on North Korea.; President Trump attends the 2017 APEC summit hosted by Vietnamese president Trần Đại Quang.; Vice President Pence joins other senior Republicans in stating that Republican Senate nominee Roy Moore ought to abandon his election campaign if there is truth in allegations of historical sexual activity with minors, as published by The Washington Post on Thursday 9th.	APEC leaders at the 2017 APEC summit
Saturday, November 11	President Trump arrives in Hanoi, Vietnam.; President Trump attends a state dinner hosted by Vietnamese president Trần Đại Quang.	President Trump attends a state dinner
Sunday, November 12	President Trump holds a joint press conference with Vietnamese president Trần Đại Quang at the Presidential Palace.; President Trump holds a bilateral meeting with Vietnamese General Secretary Nguyễn Phú Trọng and Prime Minister Nguyễn Xuân Phúc.; President Trump arrives in Manila, Philippines on his fifth and final leg of five-nation tour of Asia.	
Monday, November 13	President Trump attends the 2017 ASEAN summit hosted by Filipino president Rodrigo Duterte.; President Trump holds a bilateral meeting with Filipino president Rodrigo Duterte.; President Trump holds a bilateral meeting with Indian prime minister Narendra Modi.; President Trump holds a trilateral meeting with Australian prime minister Malcolm Turnbull and Japanese prime minister Shinzō Abe.	ASEAN leaders at the 2017 ASEAN summit
Tuesday, November 14	President Trump returns to Washington from Manila at the end of his five-nation tour of Asia.; Attorney General Jeff Sessions testifies to the House Judiciary Committee. He states that he now recalls learning of contact between Russians and the Trump campaign, but denies previously lying under oath. He announces he has no reason to disbelieve those who accuse Senate candidate Roy Moore of sexual activity with young girls.	
Wednesday, November 15		
Thursday, November 16	President Trump visits the U.S. Capitol in advance of the passing by House Republicans without Democratic votes (227-205) of a $1.4tn "Tax Cut and Jobs Act" in support of Trump's tax-cut initiative. Among numerous proposals are included a cut in corporate tax from 35% to 20%, and the abolition of the Family Flexibility Credit, the estate tax and the alternative minimum tax.; Senators Chuck Grassley and Dianne Feinstein disclose that presidential advisor Jared Kushner has failed to submit to them numerous documents concerning Wikileaks and "a Russian backdoor overture".	
Friday, November 17		
Saturday, November 18		
Sunday, November 19		
Monday, November 20	President Trump announces that North Korea will be reinstated to the United States' list of State Sponsors of Terrorism, from which it was removed in October 2008.; The administration announces an end to the temporary residency program for victims of the 2010 Haiti earthquake, effective July 2019.; Judge William Orrick of the Northern District Court of California replaces his preliminary injunction with a nationwide permanent injunction declaring that section 9(a) of Executive Order 13768 was "unconstitutional on its face" and violates "the separation of powers doctrine and deprives [the plaintiffs] of their Tenth and Fifth Amendment rights."; First Lady Melania Trump welcomes the arrival of the 2017 White House Christmas Tree.	
Tuesday, November 21	President Trump and First Lady Melania Trump participate in the National Thanksgiving Turkey Presentation.; President Trump and President Putin speak by telephone; Putin seeks support for his plan to end the Syrian civil war.; President Trump defends Senate candidate Roy Moore from accusations of sex abuse.; Ivanka Trump travels to India, to represent the U.S. at the Global Entrepreneurship Summit.	President Trump and First Lady Melania Trump pardon a turkey named “Drumstick”
Wednesday, November 22		
Thursday, November 23	Trump allegedly spent Thanksgiving with Jeffrey Epstein	
Friday, November 24		
Saturday, November 25		
Sunday, November 26		
Monday, November 27	First Lady Melania Trump unveils the Christmas decorations at the White House for the first time.; President Trump hosts a White House event honoring Second World War Navajo code talker veterans. The White House later states that it is 'ridiculous' to suggest that Trump's reiteration at the event of the name 'Pocahontas' to describe Senator Elizabeth Warren is racist, following protestation by the National Congress of American Indians and others.; Leandra English and Mick Mulvaney issue competing statements claiming leadership of the Consumer Financial Protection Bureau.; Politico reports that White House ethics lawyer James Schultz has recently resigned.	First Lady Melania Trump unveils the 2017 Christmas decorations
Tuesday, November 28	President Trump informs reporters at the White House of his administration's resolve following a new North Korean missile test which, it is believed, for the first time places Washington D.C. within range of the KPA.	
Wednesday, November 29	President Trump announces "additional major sanctions" against North Korea following a telephone conversation with Chinese president Xi Jinping.; President Trump retweets anti-Muslim propaganda posted by the convicted criminal Jayda Fransen, deputy leader of British far-right organization Britain First. British Prime Minister May condemns the action. Trump's plan to visit the UK in the New Year is reportedly abandoned on the following day.; Trump travels to St. Charles, Missouri, to deliver a speech promoting his tax plan.; Kellyanne Conway is appointed to oversee the White House's efforts to combat the opioid epidemic.; The New York Times reports that Jared Kushner has been interviewed in November by Robert Mueller's prosecutors.	
Thursday, November 30	President Trump announces the donation of his third-quarter salary to HHS efforts to solve the opioid epidemic.; Press Secretary Sanders denies reports that Secretary Tillerson is to be removed.; Jeff Sessions testifies at a private meeting of the House Intelligence Committee. According to ranking member Schiff, Sessions refuses to say whether or not President Trump asked him to hinder the Russia investigation.	

=== December 2017 ===
Date	Events	Photos/videos
Friday, December 1	Former NSA Michael Flynn pleads guilty to lying to the FBI on January 24, 2017, concerning contacts with Russian Ambassador Sergey Kislyak.	
Saturday, December 2	The Senate passes a $1.5 trillion tax cut bill (51 to 49) in support of President Trump's tax initiative.; President Trump states that there was "absolutely no collusion" between his election campaign and Russia.	
Sunday, December 3	President Trump's lawyer John M. Dowd states that Trump knew in January 2017 that Michael Flynn had likely lied to the FBI.; Ambassador Nikki Haley informs UN Secretary-General António Guterres that the U.S. is to remove itself from the UN's 2016 New York declaration for refugees and migrants.	
Monday, December 4	Seven of the nine judges on the Supreme Court lift the lower court injunctions on President Trump's third-version travel ban, thereby permitting its enforcement against the nations of Chad, Iran, Libya, Somalia, Syria, Yemen, Venezuela and North Korea. Unlike previous iterations, the ban has no expiry date.; President Trump announces 85% and 50% reductions respectively to Utah's Bears Ears National Monument and Grand Staircase–Escalante National Monument.; President Trump formally endorses Senate candidate Roy Moore.	
Tuesday, December 5	Special Counsel Robert Mueller reportedly subpoenas Deutsche Bank for records of Trump's associates. Trump's lawyer denies reports that Trump's personal financial records were subpoenaed.; Press Secretary Sanders denies that President Trump is planning to create his own private global spy network, following reporting by The Intercept and BuzzFeed News.	
Wednesday, December 6	President Trump announces that the United States is to recognize Jerusalem as the capital of Israel—the first nation to do so—and announces that the U.S. will relocate its embassy there from Tel Aviv.	President Trump announces the recognition of Jerusalem as the capital of Israel
Thursday, December 7	White House Communications Director Hope Hicks is interviewed by Special Counsel Mueller's team as part of the Russia investigation.	
Friday, December 8	President Trump holds a rally at Pensacola, Florida, near the Alabama border, at which he exhorts the Alabamian electorate to vote for Senate candidate Roy Moore on 12 December.; Speaking at an emergency meeting of the United Nations Security Council convened following Trump's Jerusalem announcement of December 6, Ambassador Haley announces that the U.S. considers an Israeli-Palestinian peace to be "closer [...] than ever before". France, Germany, Italy, Sweden and the U.K. issue a joint statement opposing Trump's decision.; Deputy National Security Adviser Dina Powell announces her resignation.; Hope Hicks is interviewed by Mueller's team for a second day.	
Saturday, December 9	President Trump attends the openings of the Mississippi Civil Rights Museum and the Museum of Mississippi History in Jackson.	
Sunday, December 10	Vice President Pence's office describes as "unfortunate" a decision by Palestinian president Mahmoud Abbas to cancel a December 19 meeting between the two during Pence's upcoming visit to the Middle East.	
Monday, December 11	President Trump calls for an end to "chain migration" following a bombing in New York City that injured five people.; President Trump signs a policy directive at the White House, ordering NASA to reprioritize manned voyages, including a return to the Moon and a mission to Mars.; U.S. District Judge Colleen Kollar-Kotelly rejects a request by the Trump administration to enforce the president's ban on transgender soldiers while the government's appeal is ongoing.	
Tuesday, December 12	President Trump signs the National Defense Authorization Act's 2018 budget, costed at $700 billion. It provides $25m for road-based cruise missile technology, in violation of the 1987 and 1988 Intermediate-Range Nuclear Forces Treaty. NATO released a statement on 15 December, stating that "full compliance with the INF Treaty is essential".; President Trump tweets his support for Republican candidate Roy Moore and condemns Democratic candidate Doug Jones on the day of Alabama's special Senate election to fill the seat vacated by Jeff Sessions in February 2017. Jones wins.	
Wednesday, December 13	Congressional Republicans reach a deal on aspects of President Trump's tax plan. Trump indicates that he will support a corporate tax rate of 21%.; It is announced that the director of communications for the White House's Office of Public Liaison, Omarosa Manigault, is to resign on January 20, 2018. Contrary reports indicate that Manigault was dismissed by Chief of Staff John Kelly and physically removed from the White House grounds.; Senator Chuck Grassley announces that two of President Trump's judicial nominees, Jeff Mateer and Brett Talley, will not be confirmed.	
Thursday, December 14	President Trump speaks by telephone with Russian president Vladimir Putin in an effort to engender co-operation over the North Korean missile threat.; The FCC repeals its net neutrality regulations.; A seventh U.S. Senator, Kamala Harris (in addition to Senators Kirsten Gillibrand, Bernie Sanders, Cory Booker, Ron Wyden, Mazie Hirono, Jeff Merkley) calls on President Trump to resign, due to the credible allegations of sexual assault against him by 19 women.	
Friday, December 15	Speaking at the White House, President Trump describes the FBI as acting disgracefully and states that people are angry. Trump shortly thereafter addresses a group of largely non-FBI graduates from a program at the FBI National Academy in Quantico, Virginia, stating "I have your back 100%".; Speaking to reporters, President Trump reiterates his description of the matter of Russian collusion as a 'hoax' and replies that "we'll see what happens" in response to questions about the possible pardoning of Michael Flynn.	
Saturday, December 16		
Sunday, December 17	Russian president Vladimir Putin telephones President Trump to thank the CIA for its assistance in preventing a planned terrorist bombing at St. Petersburg's Kazan Cathedral.; President Trump congratulates Rupert Murdoch on the deal to sell 21st Century Fox to Disney.	
Monday, December 18	President Trump publishes his first National Security Strategy and delivers a concomitant address, condemning North Korea as a rogue state and positioning China and Russia as U.S. rivals with whom his administration will attempt to "build a great partnership". Climate change is omitted from the strategy.; The U.S. blocks a resolution by the other 14 members of the UN Security Council calling for a retraction of President Trump's recent statement recognizing Jerusalem as Israel's capital. Ambassador Haley describes the resolution as an insult which "won't be forgotten".; Vice President Pence, previously due to leave for Egypt today, delays until January his visit to the Middle East, in order to oversee voting on President Trump's tax bill.	
Tuesday, December 19	The House of Representatives passes a revised version of President Trump's Tax Cuts and Jobs Act without Democratic votes, 227-203.; Elections for the Virginia House of Delegates split evenly between Republicans and Democrats following recounts. Lots are later drawn on January 4, 2018, giving Republicans a 51-49 control of the House.; Ambassador Haley states that she will be "taking names" of countries who vote in favor of the December 21 UN resolution against U.S. recognition of Jerusalem as Israel's capital and passing them to President Trump, who has suggested cutting aid to countries who do so.	
Wednesday, December 20	The Senate passes President Trump's Tax Cuts and Jobs Act shortly after midnight without Democratic votes, 51 to 48. A procedural mistake in the House on December 19 necessitates a second vote in the House, which later passes in favor, 224 to 201. The wide-ranging bill includes a cut to corporate tax from 35% to 21%, a reduction to the pool of estate-tax payers, alters each tax bracket, and reduces the rate for the highest earners. The bill also permits oil drilling in Alaska's Arctic National Wildlife Refuge and removes the individual mandate from Obamacare. President Trump announces that the bill represents a repeal of Obamacare, and that it will be replaced by "something that will be much better". The legislation is financed by debt.; The State Department announces the approval of a $41.5m sale of small arms to Ukraine.	
Thursday, December 21	Vice President Pence arrives in Afghanistan to visit troops and speak with Afghan leaders. In a speech at Bagram Airfield, he announces "I believe victory is closer than ever before."; The United Nations votes 128 to 9 in favor of a demand that the U.S. retract its recent declaration concerning Jerusalem. U.S. Ambassador Haley describes the vote as 'null and void'.; Press Secretary Sanders announces that the White House does not intend to remove Robert Mueller from the Russia investigation, and states "We look forward to seeing this hoax wrap up very soon."; Judge George B. Daniels dismisses a lawsuit by CREW against President Trump in respect of the Constitution's emoluments clause. Daniels rules that only Congress has authority in such a matter, not the courts.	
Friday, December 22	President Trump signs into law the $1.5 trillion tax bill passed by Congress on December 20.; President Trump retires to Mar-a-Lago for the Christmas holiday.; The 9th Circuit Court of Appeals rules unanimously that the current version of the travel ban exceeds presidential authority. The ban remains in effect during an additional appeals process.	
Saturday, December 23		
Sunday, December 24		
Monday, December 25	The president and first lady share their 2017 Christmas message to the country.	
Tuesday, December 26		
Wednesday, December 27	All ten members of the Presidential Advisory Council on HIV/AIDS are dismissed.; Ambassador to Panama John Feeley submits a letter of resignation.	
Thursday, December 28	President Trump expresses disappointment following reporting by South Korean newspaper Chosun Ilbo that China has been illegally supplying oil to North Korea.; In an interview with The New York Times, President Trump states that he believes that Mueller will treat him fairly and will exonerate him.	
Friday, December 29	Trump's Labor Department continues the policy of the Obama Administration of issuing waivers to banks convicted of manipulating the global interest rate Libor. Deutsche Bank and UBS are allowed to manage retirement funds for three years, while Barclays, Citigroup, and JPMorgan are allowed to do the same for five years. At the time, Trump and his businesses owe Deutsche Bank at least $130 million.	
Saturday, December 30		
Sunday, December 31		

== See also ==
- First 100 days of the first Trump presidency – Period from January to April 2017
- List of executive actions by Donald Trump
- Lists of presidential trips made by Donald Trump (international trips)
- First presidential transition of Donald Trump – Transfer of presidential power from Barack Obama to Donald Trump
- Timeline of the 2016 United States presidential election

U.S. presidential administration timelines
Preceded by First Trump presidency (2017 Q3)	First Trump presidency (2017 Q4)	Succeeded by First Trump presidency (2018 Q1)
