= List of presidential trips made by Donald Trump (2017) =

This is a list of presidential trips made by Donald Trump during 2017, the first year of his first presidency as the 45th president of the United States.

This list excludes trips made within Washington, D.C., the U.S. federal capital in which the White House, the official residence and principal workplace of the president, is located. Also excluded are trips to Camp David, the country residence of the president, as well as Joint Base Andrews. International trips are included. Here are the number of visits per state or territory he traveled to:

- One: Alabama, Arizona, Connecticut, Delaware, Georgia, Indiana, Iowa, Kentucky, Louisiana, Michigan, Mississippi, North Carolina, North Dakota, Puerto Rico, Tennessee and Utah
- Two: Hawaii, Missouri, Nevada, Ohio, South Carolina, West Virginia and Wisconsin
- Three: Pennsylvania and Texas
- Five: Maryland
- Six: New York
- Ten: New Jersey
- Twelve: Florida
- Thirty-two: Virginia
Locations in the contiguous United States that President Donald Trump has visited in 2017.

January (blue) – February (yellow) – March (brown) – April (pink) – May (grey) – June (orange) - July (purple) – August (light blue) – September (magenta) - October (green) - November (red) -

December (light green)
Locations in Puerto Rico that President Donald Trump has visited.
Locations in Hawaii President Donald Trump has visited.

Map of trips made by Donald Trump within the United States in 2017: Washington, D.C. 7 or more visits 6 visits 5 visits 4 visits 3 visits 2 visits 1 visit

== January ==
Country/ U.S. state	Areas visited	Dates	Details	Image
Virginia	Langley	January 21	President Trump visited the headquarters of the Central Intelligence Agency (CIA) in Langley, Virginia.	
Pennsylvania	Philadelphia	January 26	First trip using Air Force One. President Trump visited Philadelphia to address Congressional Republican leaders, regarding his agenda. Trump spoke at the Philadelphia Loews Hotel. British prime minister Theresa May also spoke at the event. Donald Trump returned to Washington the same day.	
Virginia	Arlington	January 27	President Trump visited the headquarters of the Department of Defense at The Pentagon.	

== February ==
Country/ U.S. state	Areas visited	Dates	Details	Image
Delaware	Dover	February 1	President Trump visited Dover Air Force Base for the arrival of the remains of a U.S. Navy SEAL who was killed in combat and was the first known combat death under the Trump administration.	
Florida	Mar-a-Lago, Tampa	February 3–6	President Trump traveled to the Mar-a-Lago Club, to attend the 60th annual Red Cross Ball, and make other public appearances in the West Palm Beach area. On February 4 he visited his Palm Beach golf club. On his way back to D.C., President Trump stopped in Tampa at MacDill Air Force Base to meet with military commanders, receive briefings, and make remarks.	
Florida	Mar-a-Lago	February 10–12	President Trump traveled to Mar-a-Lago to play golf with Japanese prime minister Shinzō Abe and discuss Japanese-American relations.	
South Carolina	North Charleston	February 17	President Trump visited a Boeing facility in North Charleston, South Carolina to attend the roll-out of the first 787-10 Dreamliner built at the facility.	
Florida	Melbourne, Mar-a-Lago	February 17–20	President Trump held a rally at Melbourne Orlando International Airport and stayed at the Mar-a-Lago resort for the third weekend in a row, where he announced H. R. McMaster as the new National Security Advisor. Trump also played several rounds of golf over the weekend visit.	
Maryland	National Harbor	February 24	President Trump spoke at the Conservative Political Action Conference in the Gaylord National Resort & Convention Center.	

== March ==
Country/ U.S. state	Areas visited	Dates	Details	Image
Virginia	Newport News	March 2	President Trump delivered remarks to shipbuilders and sailors aboard the USS Gerald R. Ford.	
Florida	Pine Hills, Mar-a-Lago	March 3–5	President Trump talked about education reform at St. Andrews Catholic School in Pine Hills and then traveled to the Mar-a-Lago resort.	
Michigan	Ypsilanti	March 15	President Trump made remarks at the American Center for Mobility at Willow Run.	
Tennessee	Nashville	March 15	President Trump made remarks at the Hermitage on the 250th birthday of Andrew Jackson, the 7th president of the United States, and held a rally at the Nashville Municipal Auditorium. Trump became the first sitting president to visit the Hermitage since Ronald Reagan.	
Florida	Mar-a-Lago	March 17–19	President Trump visited his Florida resort over the weekend.	
Kentucky	Louisville	March 20	President Trump visited Louisville to hold a rally at Freedom Hall and to promote his healthcare bill.	
Virginia	Sterling	March 25	President Trump traveled to the Trump National Golf Club, Washington, D.C., in Potomac Falls, Virginia, where he held a meeting and played golf.	
Virginia	Sterling	March 26	President Trump traveled to the Trump National Golf Club, Washington, D.C., in Potomac Falls, Virginia, where he held a meeting and played golf.	

== April ==
Country/ U.S. state	Areas visited	Dates	Details	Image
Virginia	Sterling	April 2	President Trump, Senator Rand Paul, and Budget Director Mick Mulvaney golfed at the Trump National Golf Club in Virginia, where they discussed a variety of topics, including healthcare.	
Florida	Mar-a-Lago, West Palm Beach	April 6–9	President Trump traveled to Mar-a-Lago to host Chinese president Xi Jinping. On Saturday, April 8 and Sunday April 9, Trump visited Trump International Golf Club in West Palm Beach.	
Florida	Mar-a-Lago, West Palm Beach	April 13–16	President Trump traveled to Mar-a-Lago, and golfed at the Trump International Golf Club in West Palm Beach. On Sunday, President Trump attended an Easter church service at Bethesda-by-the-Sea.	
Wisconsin	Kenosha	April 18	President Trump visited the headquarters of Snap-on Inc. in Kenosha, Wisconsin.	
Maryland	Bethesda	April 22	President Trump visited the Walter Reed National Military Medical Center in Bethesda, Maryland, giving a wounded veteran, Sergeant Alvaro Barrientos, a Purple Heart.	
Georgia (U.S. state)	Atlanta	April 28	President Trump spoke at the National Rifle Association April Leadership Forum at the Georgia World Congress Center in Atlanta, Georgia.	
Pennsylvania	Harrisburg	April 29	President Trump held a rally at the Pennsylvania Farm Show Complex & Expo Center to mark his first 100 days in office.	
Virginia	Sterling	April 30	President Trump visited the Trump National Golf Club in Virginia.	

== May ==
Country/ U.S. state	Areas visited	Dates	Details	Image
New York	New York City	May 4	President Trump met with the Australian prime minister Malcolm Turnbull at the USS Intrepid museum as part of a commemoration of the 75th anniversary of the Battle of the Coral Sea.	
New Jersey	Bedminster	May 4–7	President Trump traveled to the Trump National Golf Course, where he spent the weekend.	
Virginia	Lynchburg	May 13	President Trump delivered the commencement address at Liberty University's Williams Stadium.	
Virginia	Sterling	May 14	President Trump visited the Trump National Golf Club in Virginia.	
Connecticut	New London	May 17	President Trump delivered the Commencement Address at the United States Coast Guard Academy Graduation Ceremony.	
Saudi Arabia	Riyadh	May 20–22	President Trump made his first foreign trip to Saudi Arabia for the Riyadh Summit, arriving at King Khalid International Airport on May 20, where he met with King Salman. Trump then traveled to the Murabba Palace, where the King awarded him the Collar of Abdulaziz Al Saud. Trump later visited the National Museum of Saudi Arabia, opened the Global Center for Combating Extremist Ideology, and addressed the Arabic Islamic American Summit at the King Abdulaziz Conference Center in Riyadh.	
Israel	Tel Aviv, Jerusalem	May 22–23	President Trump arrived at Ben Gurion Airport on the afternoon of May 22, where he was greeted by President Reuven Rivlin and Prime Minister Benjamin Netanyahu. Traveling via Marine One to Jerusalem, Trump met with President Rivlin at Beit HaNassi, visited the Church of the Holy Sepulchre, and prayed at the Western Wall in the Old City, a first for a sitting president. Trump stayed overnight at the King David Hotel. Before departing Israel, Trump paid his respects at Yad Vashem and delivered a speech at the Israel Museum.	
Palestinian National Authority	Bethlehem	May 22–23	President Trump met with President Mahmoud Abbas at the Presidential Palace.	
Italy; Vatican City	Rome, Vatican City	May 23–24	Flying into Leonardo da Vinci–Fiumicino Airport, President Trump met with Pope Francis at the Apostolic Palace of the Vatican City, and toured the Sistine Chapel and St. Peter's Basilica. Trump later met President Sergio Mattarella at the Quirinal Palace and Prime Minister Paolo Gentiloni at Villa Taverna, the residency of the US ambassador. Trump stayed overnight at Villa Taverna.	
Belgium	Brussels	May 24–25	Arriving at Melsbroek Air Base on May 24, President Trump met King Philippe and Prime Minister Charles Michel at the Royal Palace in Brussels. On May 25 President Trump met Donald Tusk and Jean-Claude Juncker at the European Union Headquarters. He also had a working luncheon with French president Emmanuel Macron at the US Embassy. He attended the 2017 NATO summit and the U.S.–EU summit meeting at the new NATO Headquarters where he also participated in the unveiling of the Article 5 and Berlin Wall memorials.	
Italy	Taormina	May 25–27	President Trump attended the 43rd G7 summit. and addressed troops stationed at the Naval Air Station Sigonella, where he stayed overnight. He also held bilateral meetings with German chancellor Angela Merkel and Japanese prime minister Shinzō Abe. Trump attended a concert by La Scala Philharmonic Orchestra at the Ancient theatre of Taormina.	
Virginia	Arlington	May 29	President Trump participated in Memorial Day ceremonies at Arlington National Cemetery, speaking at Memorial Amphitheater. Trump laid a wreath on the Tomb of the Unknown Soldier, and visited graves in Section 60 of the cemetery.	

== June ==
Country/ U.S. state	Areas visited	Dates	Details	Image
Virginia	Sterling	June 3	President Trump visited the Trump National Golf Club in Virginia.	
Virginia	Sterling	June 4	President Trump visited the Trump National Golf Club in Virginia and was joined by Peyton Manning and Tennessee Senator Bob Corker.	
Ohio	Cincinnati	June 7	President Donald Trump traveled to Cincinnati to talk about his plan for new federal spending on infrastructure, delivering a speech at Cincinnati Municipal Lunken Airport. He later delivered remarks at the Rivertowne Marina in East End, Cincinnati.	
New Jersey	Bedminster	June 9–11	President Trump spent the weekend at the Trump National Golf Course, where he headlined a fundraiser for Representative Tom MacArthur.	
Wisconsin	Milwaukee, Pewaukee	June 13	President Trump visited Wisconsin to talk about apprenticeships to close skills gap, touring Waukesha County Technical College. Trump delivered remarks at General Mitchell International Airport, and headlined a fundraiser for Governor Scott Walker at the Hyatt Regency in downtown Milwaukee.	
Florida	Miami	June 16	President Trump traveled to Miami to announce a rollback of former president Barack Obama's policies toward Cuba, speaking at the Manuel Artime Theater in Little Havana.	
Iowa	Cedar Rapids	June 21	President Trump traveled to Iowa to speak about rural development at Kirkwood Community College and held a rally at the U.S. Cellular Center. This was Trump's first visit as president to a state west of the Mississippi River.	
Virginia	Sterling	June 24	President Trump visited the Trump National Golf Club.	
Virginia	Sterling	June 25	President Trump visited the Trump National Golf Club, where he reportedly played eighteen holes of golf.	
New Jersey	Bedminster	June 30 – July 1	President Trump traveled to the Trump National Golf Course in Bedminster, New Jersey, arriving at Morristown Municipal Airport.	

== July ==
Country/ U.S. state	Areas visited	Dates	Details	Image
New Jersey	Bedminster	July 1–3	After spending much of the day at the Trump National Golf Club, Bedminster, President Trump departed for Washington, D.C. to attend the Celebrate Freedom Rally. Trump returned to Bedminster later that night. He departed via Morristown Municipal Airport for Washington, D.C. in the evening of July 3.	
Virginia	Sterling	July 4	President Trump traveled to the Trump National Golf Club.	
Poland	Warsaw	July 5–6	On July 5, arriving at Warsaw Chopin Airport, President Trump and the First Lady were welcomed by Polish foreign affairs minister Witold Waszczykowski. On July 6 he had bilateral meetings with the president of Poland Andrzej Duda and the president of Croatia Kolinda Grabar-Kitarović. President Trump participated in the Three Seas summit to discuss energy issues with twelve European leaders and delivered a speech to the People of Poland in front of the Warsaw Uprising Monument at the Krasiński Square.	
Germany	Hamburg	July 6–8	President Trump arrived at Hamburg and had a bilateral meeting with Chancellor Angela Merkel on July 6. President Trump and his daughter Ivanka Trump spoke at the G20 summit at Hamburg Messe. He attended an event at Elbphilharmonie. He held several bilateral meetings, including one with Russian president Vladimir Putin.	
Virginia	Sterling	July 9	President Trump traveled to the Trump National Golf Club.	
France	Paris	July 13–14	President Trump and First Lady Melania Trump traveled to Paris, arriving via Orly Airport on July 13. President Trump visited Les Invalides. President Trump held a bilateral meeting with President Emmanuel Macron at Élysée Palace on July 13. The two leaders later had dinner at Le Jules Verne on the Eiffel Tower. On July 14, President Trump participated in the Bastille Day celebrations marking the 100th anniversary of the Entry of the United States into World War I.	
New Jersey	Bedminster	July 14–16	President Trump spent the weekend at the Trump National Golf Club where he watched the United States Women's Open Championship.	
Virginia	Arlington County	July 20	President Trump traveled to the Pentagon for a closed "political-military" meeting.	
Virginia	Naval Station Norfolk	July 22	President Trump traveled to Naval Station Norfolk for the commissioning ceremony for the USS Gerald R. Ford.	
Virginia	Sterling	July 22	President Trump traveled to the Trump National Golf Club.	
Virginia	Sterling	July 23	President Trump traveled to the Trump National Golf Club.	
West Virginia	Glen Jean	July 24	Arriving via Raleigh County Memorial Airport, President Trump attended the 2017 National Scout Jamboree, speaking at the Summit Bechtel National Scout Reserve.	
Ohio	Youngstown, Struthers	July 25	Arriving via Youngstown-Warren Regional Airport, President Trump addressed veterans at AMVETS Post 44 in Struthers, and then held a rally at the Covelli Centre.	
New York	Brentwood	July 28	Landing at Long Island MacArthur Airport, President Trump delivered remarks on a crackdown of the MS-13 gang at the Van Nostrand Theatre of Suffolk County Community College.	
Virginia	Sterling	July 30	President Trump traveled to the Trump National Golf Club in Sterling, Virginia.	

== August ==
Country/ U.S. state	Areas visited	Dates	Details	Image
West Virginia	Huntington	August 3	Arriving at Tri-State Airport in Wayne County, President Trump held a rally at the Big Sandy Superstore Arena, where West Virginia governor Jim Justice announced that he was changing his party affiliation to Republican.	
New Jersey	Bedminster	August 4–14	President Trump started a planned 11-day getaway to his private golf club.	
New York	New York City	August 14–16	President Trump traveled to Trump Tower in Midtown Manhattan, New York City, arriving at John F. Kennedy International Airport.	
New Jersey	Bedminster	August 16–18	President Trump returned to the Trump National Golf Club in Bedminster from New York. Trump departed on August 18 via Morristown Municipal Airport for Camp David.	
Virginia	Arlington	August 21	President Trump delivered a speech about Afghanistan policy at Conmy Hall in Joint Base Myer–Henderson Hall.	
Arizona	Yuma, Phoenix	August 22	President Trump spoke at the Marine Corps Air Station Yuma. He held a rally at the Phoenix Convention Center.	
Nevada	Reno	August 23	President Trump traveled to the Reno-Sparks Convention Center in Reno to speak at the 99th annual convention of the American Legion.	President Donald J. Trump delivers remarks at the National Convention of the American Legion August 23, 2017
Texas	Corpus Christi, Austin	August 29	President Trump traveled to Corpus Christi, Texas, arriving at Corpus Christi International Airport, where he spoke with people affected by Hurricane Harvey at the Annaville Fire House. Trump then traveled to Austin, arriving via Austin–Bergstrom International Airport, and delivered remarks at the Texas Department of Public Safety Emergency Operations Center.	
Missouri	Springfield	August 30	Arriving via Springfield-Branson National Airport, President Trump traveled to the Loren Cook Company in Springfield, Missouri, where he held a rally to launch his plan to overhaul the American tax code.	President Trump Travels to the Loren Cook Company 2017

== September ==
Country/ U.S. state	Areas visited	Dates	Details	Image
Texas	Houston, Pearland	September 2	President Trump traveled to Texas for a second trip to the region following Hurricane Harvey, arriving at Ellington Airport. The president was joined by First Lady Melania Trump, visited the First Church Pearland, and met with those affected by the storm at the NRG Center.	September 2, 2017
Louisiana	Lake Charles	September 2	Arriving at Chennault International Airport, President Trump met with emergency responders, including members of the Cajun Navy, at a Louisiana Air National Guard armory.	
North Dakota	Bismarck, Mandan	September 6	Arriving via Bismarck Municipal Airport, President Trump traveled to the Andeavor Refinery in Mandan, North Dakota to continue to promote his support for tax reform.	President Donald J. Trump attends a tax reform for energy workers event at Andeavor Refinery, Wednesday, September 6, 2017, in Mandan, North Dakota.
Virginia	Arlington	September 11	President Trump and First Lady Melania Trump participated in a memorial ceremony at the Pentagon Memorial in Arlington County, Virginia, where he spoke on the sixteenth anniversary of the September 11 attacks.	President Donald J. Trump and First Lady Melania Trump participate in a Sep 11 observance at the Pentagon
Florida	Naples, Fort Myers	September 14	President Trump and First Lady Melania Trump traveled to Florida to survey damage that was incurred as a result of Hurricane Irma. Trump met with members of the United States Coast Guard at the Private Sky hangar at Southwest Florida International Airport. The President also toured Naples Estates, a mobile home community hit by the hurricane.	September 14, 2017
Maryland	Prince George's County	September 15	President Trump visited Joint Base Andrews in Prince George's County, Maryland, where he delivered remarks to troops and viewed an air show.	
New Jersey	Bedminster	September 15–17	President Trump traveled to the Trump National Golf Club.	
New York	New York City	September 17–21	President Trump traveled to New York City to attend a United Nations summit, arriving at Trump Tower on September 17. On September 18, President Trump delivered remarks at the Headquarters of the United Nations. President Trump subsequently held meetings with numerous world leaders at the Lotte New York Palace Hotel.	President Donald J. Trump at the 72nd United Nations General Assembly
New Jersey	Bedminster	September 21–22	Following the completion of the UN General Assembly, President Trump traveled to the Trump National Golf Club.	
Alabama	Huntsville	September 22	President Trump interrupted his stay at Trump National Golf Club to attend a campaign rally in Huntsville, Alabama, in support of Senate candidate Luther Strange. The rally was held at Von Braun Civic Center. President Trump returned to Bedminster following the rally.	
New York	New York City	September 26	President Trump delivered remarks at the United States Mission to the United Nations. Trump then headlined a fundraiser for the Republican National Committee at Le Cirque in Midtown Manhattan.	
Indiana	Indianapolis	September 27	Arriving via Indianapolis International Airport, President Trump traveled to Indianapolis to garner support for tax reform by speaking at the Farm Bureau Building, located on the Indiana State Fairgrounds.	President Donald J. Trump delivers remarks on tax reform
New Jersey	Bedminster, Jersey City	September 29 – October 1	President Trump traveled to the Trump National Golf Club. On October 1, the president flew to Jersey City, where he attended the President's Cup at Liberty National Golf Club. Trump observed the tournament from the Commissioner's Hospitality by the 14th green with Commissioner Jay Monahan, and presented the trophy to Steve Stricker.	

== October ==
Country/ U.S. state	Areas visited	Dates	Details	Image
Puerto Rico	San Juan, Guaynabo	October 3	President Trump traveled to San Juan, Puerto Rico, via Muñiz Air National Guard Base to assess the damage caused by Hurricane Maria. Trump met disaster survivors while walking the streets of Guaynabo and handed out emergency supplies at Calvary Chapel. Trump also visited the USS Kearsarge.	President Trump and first lady Melania walk through a neighborhood in Guaynabo.
Nevada	Las Vegas	October 4	President Trump and First Lady Melania Trump traveled to Las Vegas, Nevada, following the 2017 Las Vegas shooting and was accompanied by House majority leader Kevin McCarthy, R-California, Senator Dean Heller, R-Nevada, and Representative Mark Amodei, R-Nevada. He landed at McCarran International Airport and was greeted on the ground by Nevada governor Brian Sandoval, Las Vegas mayor Carolyn Goodman and Las Vegas Metropolitan Police Department sheriff Joseph Lombardo. The trip also consisted of meeting with victims and medical professionals at the University Medical Center of Southern Nevada. He also met with police and first responders and addressed the American public from the Las Vegas Police Department's headquarters.	
Virginia	Sterling	October 7	President Trump made a first trip over the weekend to the Trump National Golf Club in Sterling, Virginia.	
North Carolina	Greensboro	October 7	Arriving via Piedmont Triad International Airport, President Trump attended a fundraiser for the Trump Victory Committee, hosted by Louis Dejoy and Aldona Wos, in the Irving Park neighborhood of Greensboro, North Carolina.	
Virginia	Sterling	October 8	President Trump made a second and third trips over the weekend to the Trump National Golf Club in Sterling, Virginia.	
Virginia	Sterling	October 9	President Trump made a second and third trips over the weekend to the Trump National Golf Club in Sterling, Virginia.	
Pennsylvania	Harrisburg	October 11	President Trump delivered remarks on tax reform at Hangar 71 at Harrisburg International Airport.	
Maryland	Laurel	October 13	President Trump visited the United States Secret Service James J. Rowley Training Center, touring the Moran Vehicle Training facility in Laurel, Maryland.	
Virginia	Sterling	October 14	President Trump traveled to the Trump National Golf Club, where he played golf with Senator Lindsey Graham.	
Virginia	Sterling	October 15	President Trump traveled to the Trump National Golf Club, where he played golf with Senator Rand Paul.	
South Carolina	Greer	October 16	Arriving via Greenville–Spartanburg International Airport, President Trump delivered remarks at a fundraiser for the re-election of South Carolina governor Henry McMaster at the Embassy Suites Greenville Golf Resort.	
Virginia	Sterling	October 21	President Trump visited his Trump National Golf Club.	
Virginia	Sterling	October 22	President Trump visited his Trump National Golf Club.	
Texas	Dallas	October 25	President Trump participated in a hurricane recovery effort briefing at the Signature Aviation terminal in Dallas Love Field, an RNC roundtable and a Trump Victory Committee reception at the Alfred Horatio Belo House.	President Donald J. Trump, joined by Texas Gov. Gregg Abbott, Lt. Gov. Dan Patrick and FEMA officials, attends a briefing on the continuing Hurricane Harvey relief and recovery efforts, during a meeting in the Signature Flight Support facility at Dallas Love Field, Wednesday, October 25, 2017, in Dallas, Texas. Gov. Abbott thanked President Trump for his commitment to Texas.
Virginia	Sterling	October 28	President Trump visited his Trump National Golf Course in Sterling, Virginia. Along the way, Juli Briskman riding her bicycle made an obscene gesture to the motorcade, which was captured on camera and led to her firing.	

== November ==
Country/ U.S. state	Areas visited	Dates	Details	Image
Hawaii	Pearl Harbor, Aiea, Honolulu	November 3–4	President Trump and First Lady Melania Trump traveled to Hawaii en route Asia, arriving via Joint Base Pearl Harbor–Hickam. President Trump received a briefing at the Nimitz-MacArthur Pacific Command Center in Camp H. M. Smith, and visited the USS Arizona Memorial at Pearl Harbor. Before departing Trump visited the Trump International Hotel Waikiki and greeted the employees there.	
Japan	Fussa, Kawagoe, Tokyo	November 5–7	President Trump and First Lady Melania Trump traveled to Tokyo, Japan, arriving via Yokota Air Base in Fussa, where the president addressed U.S. troops and members of the Japan Self-Defense Forces. President Trump first met with Prime Minister Shinzō Abe at Kasumigaseki Country Club in Kawagoe, Saitama, where they played golf with professional golfer Hideki Matsuyama. On November 6, President Trump held a bilateral meeting and joint press conference with Prime Minister Abe at Akasaka Palace, where they discussed trade and the threat of North Korea's nuclear weapons capability. The president and the first lady also met with Emperor Akihito and Empress Michiko at the Tokyo Imperial Palace. President Trump and Prime Minister Abe also dined together at the Ginza Ukai Tei restaurant in Ginza.	
South Korea	Seoul	November 7–8	President Trump and First Lady Melania Trump traveled to Seoul, South Korea, arriving via Osan Air Base. This was the first state visit by a sitting U.S. president to South Korea since 1992. President Trump visits U.S. and South Korean troops at Camp Humphreys, before holding a bilateral meeting and joint press conference with President Moon Jae-in at the Blue House. The two presidents discussed the issue of North Korea and cooperation on the strengthening of South Korea's defense capabilities. At the Blue House, the Trumps attended a state dinner hosted by President Moon and First Lady Kim Jung-sook. On November 8, President Trump addressed the National Assembly. An unannounced visit to the Demilitarized Zone was initially scheduled, but was canceled due to heavy fog. Before departing Seoul, the president and the first lady laid a wreath at the Seoul National Cemetery to honor the victims of the Korean War.	
China	Beijing	November 8–10	President Trump and First Lady Melania Trump traveled to Beijing, China, arriving via Beijing Capital International Airport. This was the first state visit by a sitting U.S. president to China since 1998. They met with President Xi Jinping and his wife, Peng Liyuan, at the Forbidden City, which they toured before viewing a Peking opera performance and having dinner together. Trump became the first foreign leader since the founding of the People's Republic of China to be treated to an official dinner at the Forbidden City. On November 9, the President and the First Lady were welcomed by President Xi and Madame Peng at the Great Hall of the People. Trump and Xi both addressed China–U.S. trade relations during their speeches at a business event. Aside from bilateral trade relations, the two presidents also discussed the issue of North Korea. The two countries signed business deals worth more than $250 billion. President Trump also met with Premier Li Keqiang. The president and the first lady were hosted to a state dinner by President Xi and Madame Peng at the Great Hall of the People.	
Vietnam	Da Nang, Hanoi	November 10–12	President Trump traveled to Da Nang, Vietnam to attend the APEC Vietnam 2017 summit. On November 11, he traveled to Hanoi for a state visit, where he met with President Trần Đại Quang, Communist Party general secretary Nguyễn Phú Trọng, and Prime Minister Nguyễn Xuân Phúc. This was the first ever state visit to Vietnam by a sitting U.S. president.	
Philippines	Manila, Pasay	November 12–14	President Trump traveled to Manila, Philippines to attend the 31st ASEAN Summit and Related Summits. He also met with President Rodrigo Duterte.	
Hawaii	Hickam	November 14	President Trump stopped at Hickam Air Force Base en route to Washington, D.C., following the completion of his East Asian tour.	
Florida	Mar-a-Lago, West Palm Beach	November 21–26	President Trump traveled to West Palm Beach via Palm Beach International Airport for the Thanksgiving Holiday. On November 23, Trump visited the Coast Guard Station Lake Worth Inlet. On November 24, Trump visited Trump International Golf Club to play a round of golf with Tiger Woods and Dustin Johnson.	
Missouri	St. Charles	November 29	President Trump traveled to Missouri to hold a rally to garner public support for tax reform. The event took place at the St. Charles Convention Center.	President Donald J. Trump visits Missouri to deliver remarks on tax reform

== December ==
Country/ U.S. state	Areas visited	Dates	Details	Image
New York	New York City	December 2	President Trump traveled to New York City to attend a Trump Victory Committee breakfast, a Republican National Committee holiday lunch and a fundraising event at a private residence. The president returned to Washington, D.C., later that day.	
Utah	Salt Lake City	December 4	President Trump traveled to Salt Lake City, via Roland R. Wright Air National Guard Base, to announce the shrinking of several Utah National Monuments including Bears Ears National Monument and Grand Staircase Escalante. While in Salt Lake City, President Trump met with leaders of the Church of Jesus Christ of Latter-day Saints for a tour of Welfare Square.	President Donald J. Trump delivers remarks at the Utah State Capitol
Florida	Pensacola, Mar-a-Lago	December 8–10	President Trump traveled to northern Florida to hold a rally at the Pensacola Bay Center in the run up to the special election for the Alabama Senate seat vacated by Jeff Sessions. Following the rally, President Trump spent the night at his Mar-a-Lago Resort, arriving via Palm Beach International Airport.	
Mississippi	Jackson	December 9	President Trump visited Jackson to celebrate the state's bicentennial as well as participate in the opening of the Mississippi Civil Rights Museum.	
Virginia	Stafford	December 15	President Trump delivered remarks at the FBI National Academy Graduation Ceremony.	
Maryland	Bethesda	December 21	President Trump visited the USO Warrior & Family Center in Building 83 of Walter Reed National Military Medical Center in Bethesda, Maryland.	
Florida	Mar-a-Lago, West Palm Beach	December 22–31	Arriving via Palm Beach International Airport, President Trump and First Lady Melania Trump traveled to West Palm Beach, where they spend their Christmas Holiday at his resort in Mar-a-Lago. On December 23 and 24, President Trump traveled to the Trump International Golf Club in West Palm Beach. On December 24, President Trump attended a Christmas service at Bethesda-by-the-Sea. On December 26, President Trump traveled again to the Trump International Golf Club, where he golfed with Senator David Perdue and professional golfers Bryson DeChambeau and Dana Quigley, and later met with first responders at West Palm Beach Fire Rescue #2. President Trump returned to the same golf course on December 28, where he dined with Secretary Wilbur Ross. President Trump returned to the golf course on December 29, where he invited service members of Coast Guard Station Lake Worth Inlet to play. President Trump traveled to the golf course again on December 30 and 31, where he played golf.	President Donald J. Trump holds a video teleconference with members of the U.S. military.

== See also ==
- List of international presidential trips made by Donald Trump
- List of Donald Trump rallies (December 2016–2022)
- Lists of presidential trips made by Donald Trump
