= 2017 Donald Trump speech in Warsaw =

2017 speech

Remarks by President Trump to the People of Poland
- Full video of the speech as published by the White House
- Date: July 6, 2017 (9 years ago)
- Time: 13:16 CET (12:16 UTC)
- Duration: 39 minutes
- Venue: In front of the Warsaw Uprising Monument at the Krasiński Square
- Location: Warsaw, Poland; 52.2494°N 21.0059°E
- Type: Speech and rally

On July 6, 2017, U.S. President Donald Trump delivered a public speech in front of the Warsaw Uprising Monument at Krasiński Square, in Warsaw, Poland.

During the speech, Trump argued the future of Western freedom was at stake and called to defend Western civilization against the threats of terrorism and extremism.

== Background ==
Polish President Andrzej Duda invited Donald Trump to visit months ago before the event. Trump was to attend the 2017 G20 Hamburg summit and planned a visit to Poland ahead of it. He and the First Lady Melania Trump arrived at Warsaw Chopin Airport on July 5, 2017, and the Polish Foreign Affairs Minister Witold Waszczykowski greeted them. On the next day, Trump met with the president of Poland Andrzej Duda and the president of Croatia Kolinda Grabar-Kitarović. At the same time, he participated at the second summit of the Three Seas Initiative in Warsaw, Poland. On June 29, 2017, General H. R. McMaster explained Trump's upcoming trip to Poland with several objectives. In his statement, the visit to Poland was going to strengthen American alliances, demonstrate the United States and Europe's commitment to liberty and the rule of law, reinforce the common understanding of threats, respond to Russia's destabilizing activity, expand economic opportunity on the energy market, and address the environmental issue. Jarosław Kaczyński, the head of the PiS political party, foresaw Trump's visit to be a "new success" for the country. Trump was also expecting a warmer welcome in Warsaw, Poland due to the Poles' support of his presidency.

== Location ==
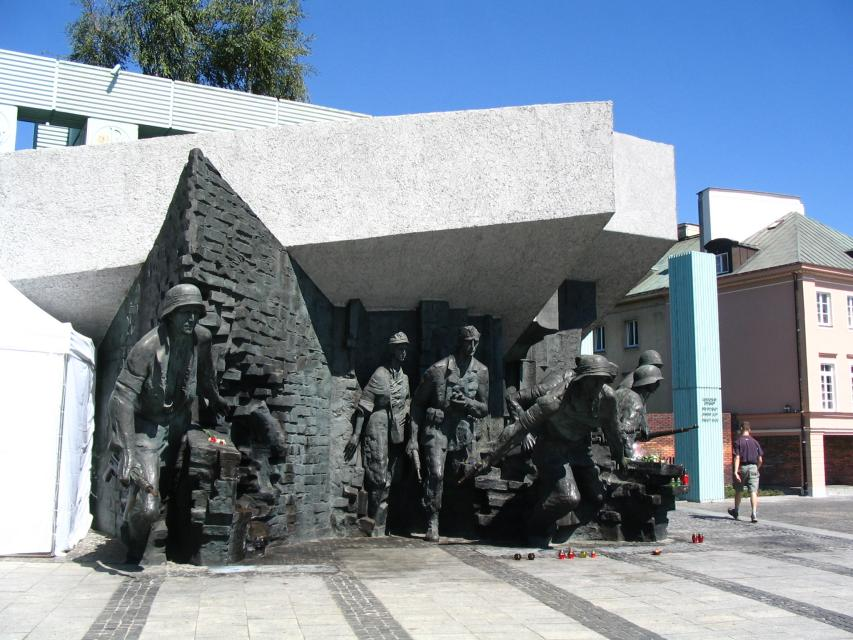
Warsaw Uprising Monument

The event took place at Warsaw Uprising Monument at Krasinski Square, in Warsaw. The Warsaw Uprising Monument was dedicated to the Warsaw Uprising of 1944. While in Warsaw, Trump stayed at the Warsaw Marriott Hotel.

== Preparation ==
Trump was planning to stop in Poland before the G20 summit in Germany. Before the event, Poland set up a stage at the downtown Warsaw square for the event and deployed security in preparing for the U.S. president's visit. There were colorful posters on the streets to invite people to attend the event and hung signs showing traffic diversions that indicated the place where Trump would stay during his visit to Warsaw. Ruling politicians and pro-government activists also planned to bus in groups of people to attend the event for ensuring a warm welcome for Trump.

== Contents and delivery ==
=== Energy trade deal ===
Trump began his speech by proclaiming America's eagerness to consolidate the partnership with Poland. He called for stronger trade and commerce ties between the two countries and pledged to provide alternative energy to address Poland's reliance on a sole energy supplier.

Trade between the United States and Poland has risen steadily over the past few years, and Trump's speech shows his commitment to continuing to push for economic progress between the two countries. Trump was signaling a move to reduce Poland's dependence on Russia since it had been importing Russian gas as a primary energy source. On June 7, the United States initiated an action to send Poland its first natural gas, which was said to be the turning point in Poland's efforts to end its reliance on Russian coal. So both the move and the speech directly challenged Russia's dominant position in the European gas markets while announcing the US economic alliance with Poland.

=== Remembrance and praise ===
Trump spoke highly of the spirit of the Polish for defending the freedom and independence of the country several times in the speech, notably the unity of Poles against the oppression of communism. He applauded the Poles' prevailing spiritual determination, and recalled the gathering of the Poles in 1979 that created the famous chant: "We want God."

The incident was evoked by Pope John Paul II in his return to Poland when he gave a speech to more than a million Polish people that shook the position of the atheistic communists in Poland. The event created a series of solidarity movements until the fall of the Berlin Wall in 1989.

=== Concerns about terrorism ===
While communism no longer poses a threat to Western civilization, another radical ideology is still threatening Western harmony, Trump said. Referring to the terrorist attacks on the United States and Europe, he declared the resolution to stop the spread of terrorism and extremism under the threat of "radical Islamic terror."

Ongoing wars in the Middle East have led to large numbers of refugees seeking asylum, and European countries were the primary recipients. Since the European Union members were required to accept the Quotas of Migrants to alleviate the burden of the main landing sites for the migrants, refugees were swarming into the member states (including Malta, Finland, Ireland, Luxembourg, Latvia, Lithuania, Sweden, Portugal, Estonia, Cyprus, Netherlands, Slovenia, Germany, Belgium, France, Romania, Spain, Croatia, Bulgaria, Slovakia, Austria, Norway, Switzerland, and Liechtenstein) that later caused the refugee crisis. However, Poland, Hungary, and the Czech Republic have refused to accept the refugee quotas and rarely admit any asylum-seekers. Jarosław Kaczyński, the leader of the ruling Law and Justice party, had explained to the public that a part of asylum seekers may cause destruction to the safety and culture of the country. Trump, during his presidency, shares the same political views with the party, and Trump himself further endorsed the approach by encouraging the member states of the NATO (North Atlantic Treaty Organization) to demonstrate their belief in the future of Western survival.

=== Concerns about Russia's activities ===
Trump also said the United States and Poland held mutual values and commitment against Russia's actions and destabilizing activities that supported the hostile regimes including Syria and Iran.

The U.S. claimed to aim at ceasing the activities of Islamic State (IS) in Syria. On the other hand, Russia supported the Assad to secure its military influence in the region. There were also speculations suggested that Russia allied with Assad to safeguard the Iran–Iraq–Syria pipeline and remain control over the European gas market. The conflict thus drew the separated standpoint between the western countries and Russia as Trump demonstrated. Trump also incidentally spoke of "the steady creep of government bureaucracy" that "drains the vitality and wealth of the people."

=== Stress on mutual defense ===
Trump also expressed his support of Article 5, the collective defense commitment of the NATO.

According to Collective Defense Article 5, an attack against one ally is considered an attack against all allies.

== Reception ==
On the day of the given speech, Trump received various responses from different media outlets. The Wall Street Journal remarked, "Mr. Trump finally offered the core of what could become a governing philosophy. It is a determined and affirmative defense of the Western tradition." The next day, Marc Thiessen from AEIdeas commented positively, "Donald Trump's speech in Warsaw's Krasinski Square was the best of his presidency, and one that any American could take pride in," he said, "He needs more moments like this."

Jonathan Capehart, an editorial board member of The Washington Post had a more critical response, which he titled Trump's speech a "white-nationalist dog whistles." David Smith from The Guardian regarded that "his attempt to set out a Trump doctrine will be remembered not for a quotable zinger but for muddled thinking and dark nativism." He also noted that Trump's rare criticism of the president of Russia Vladimir Putin was to "please Republican hawks at home." Peter Beinart from The Atlantic critically commented on Trump's Western values, which the term only depicted the white and Christian rather than the essence of the nation: "Trump's sentence only makes sense as a statement of racial and religious paranoia."

== Audience ==
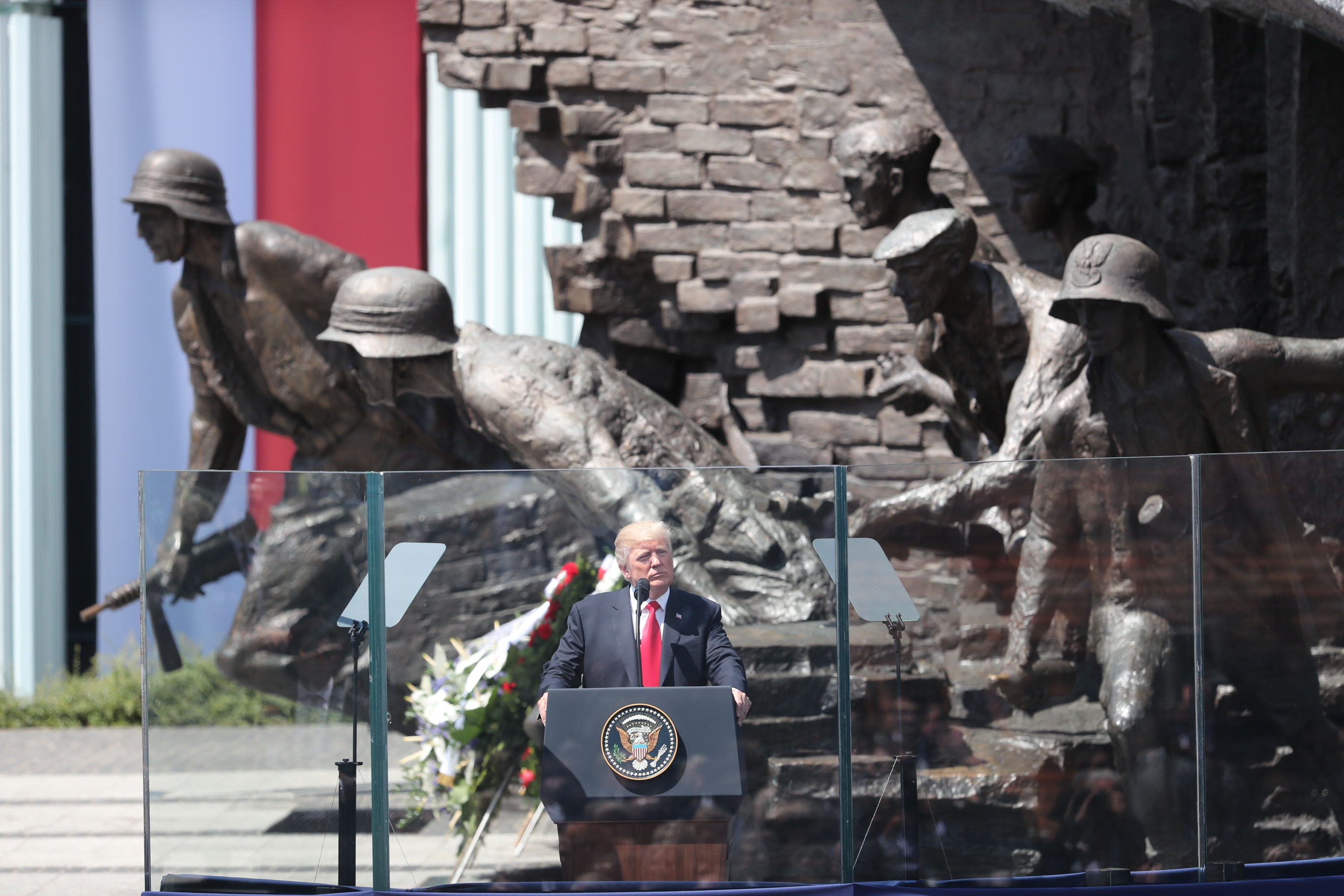
President Trump delivering the speech in front of the Warsaw Uprising Monument at the Krasiński Square in Warsaw

During the speech, the crowd at the square were chanting with the slogan of "DONALD TRUMP" which interrupted the speech several times. However, there was opposition to Trump's arrival in Warsaw on that day. Polish women gathered together wearing the costume inspired by Margaret Atwood's 1985 feminist novel The Handmaid's Tale to protest Trump's sexism. They held up signs written with "DUMB TRUMP" to show opposition.

== Former U.S. presidential visits to Poland ==
Trump's arrival marked the eighth U.S. presidential visit to Poland. In May 1972, Richard Nixon became the first U.S. president to visit Poland. Nixon arrived at Warsaw to deliver a speech when Poland was still controlled by the Polish United Workers' Party. The visit paved the way for trade exchanges and U.S. loans for Poland. Gerald Ford visited Warsaw and Kraków in July 1975 to acknowledge the development of the U.S.-Poland relationship. Jimmy Carter visited Poland in 1977 on one of his first foreign trip as president. George H. W. Bush visited Poland in July 1989 to congratulate Poland overthrowing communists. In succession, Bill Clinton, George W. Bush, and Barack Obama had made their visits to Poland.

== Aftermath ==
In November 2017, the Polish state-owned energy company PGNiG signed a 5-year deal to import liquified natural gas (LNG) from the United States. In October 2018, the company further signed a long-term deal to import up to 2 million tonnes of LNG from the United States annually over 20 years. The CEO of PGNiG Piotr Wozniak believed the deal is more beneficial than buying gas from Russia.

President of Poland Andrzej Duda visited the White House to attend a joint press conference with Trump in November 2018, and they discussed a plan of establishing a U.S. military base in Poland. Poland also offered to contribute more than $2 billion to support this project.

== See also ==
- 2022 Joe Biden speech in Warsaw
