= Warsaw Uprising Monument =

Public sculpture in Poland

- Pomnik Powstania Warszawskiego
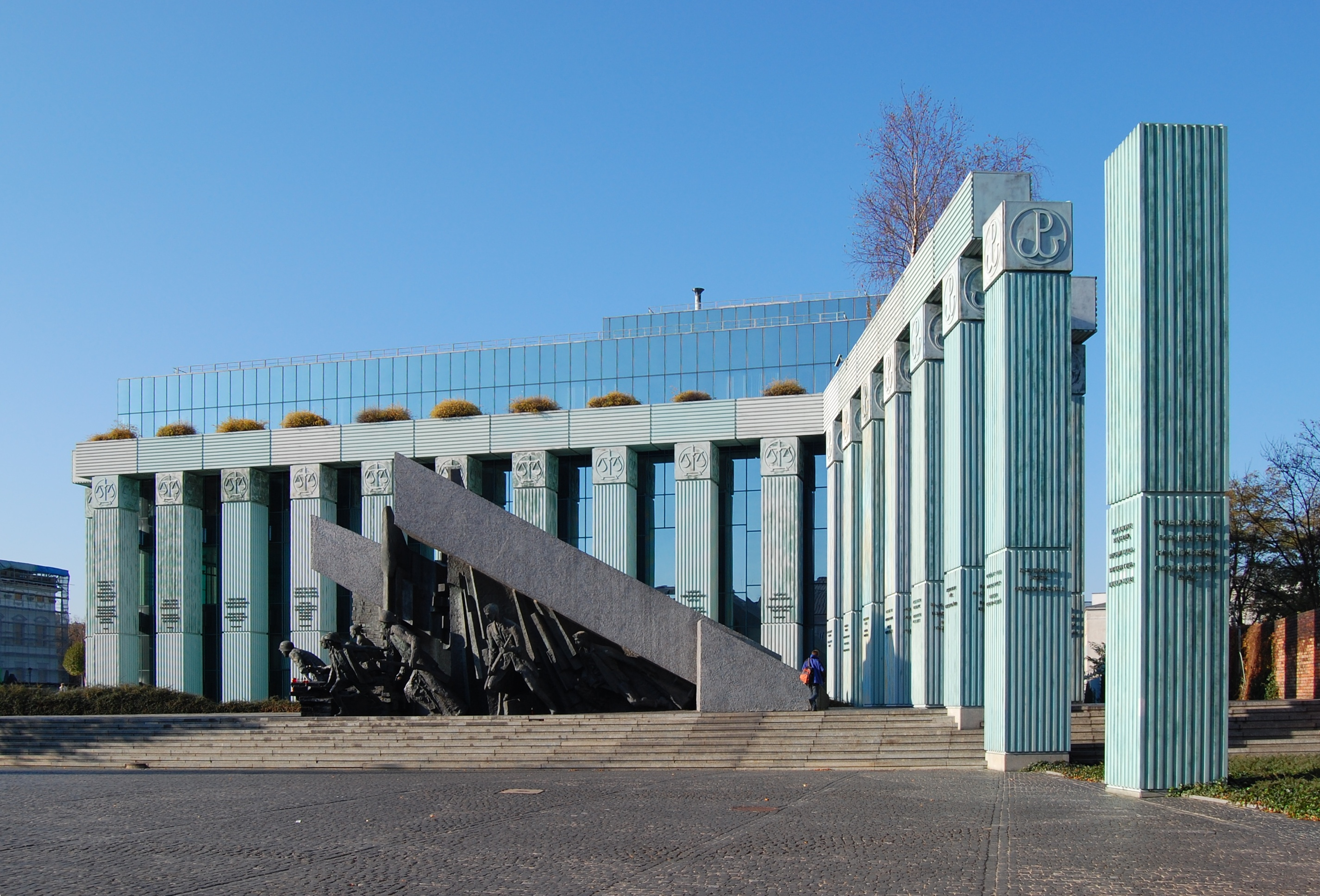
- Warsaw Uprising Monument in Krasiński Square in Warsaw
- Interactive map of Warsaw Uprising Monument
- Location: Warsaw, Poland
- Coordinates: 52°14′58″N 21°0′21″E
- Designer: Wincenty Kućma, Jacek Budyn
- Height: 10 metres (33 ft)
- Completion date: 1 August 1989
- Dedicated to: Warsaw Uprising insurgents

Warsaw Uprising Monument (Polish: pomnik Powstania Warszawskiego) is a monument in Warsaw, Poland, dedicated to the Warsaw Uprising of 1944. Unveiled in 1989, it was designed by Jacek Budyn and sculpted by Wincenty Kućma. It is located on the southern side of Krasiński Square.

The monument has been described as "the most important monument of post-war Warsaw." Gazeta Wyborcza reported in 2012 that it is one of the most visited landmarks for foreign tourists.

== History ==
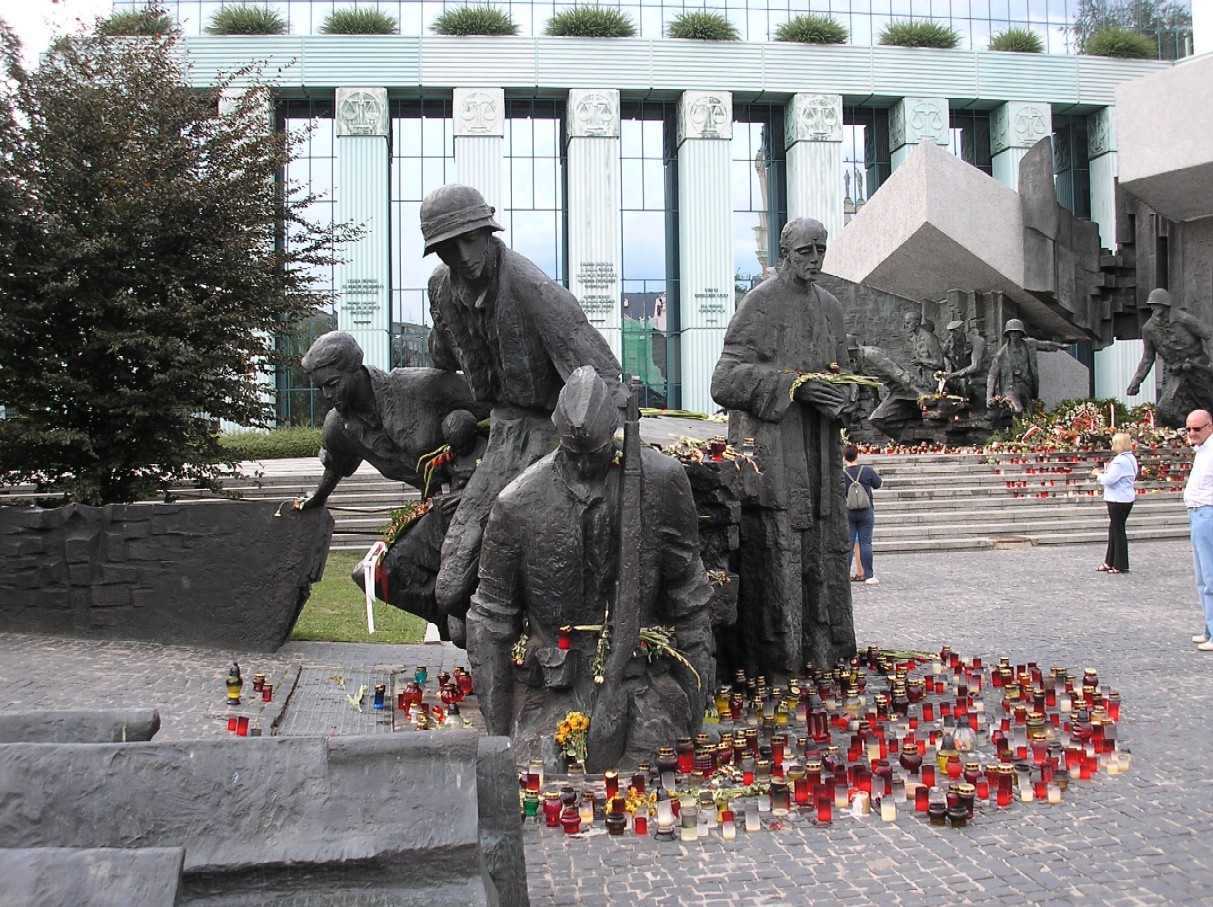
Smaller section of the monument

The Warsaw Uprising, which broke out on 1 August 1944 and lasted until 2 October 1944, was one of the most important and devastating events in the history of Warsaw and Poland. Up to 90% of Warsaw's buildings were destroyed during the hostilities and the systematic destruction of the city carried out by the Germans after the uprising.

However, it was also an event that the communist authorities of the post-war People's Republic of Poland found highly controversial, as it was organised by the Polish resistance movement that had fought for Poland's independence during World War II, principally the Home Army, the remnants of which were brutally suppressed by the postwar Stalinist regime. In addition, Joseph Stalin had purposefully stopped the Soviet advance through Polish territory just short of Warsaw immediately after the outbreak of the uprising, and he not only refused to aid the insurgents but also refused to allow planes of the western allies to land and refuel on Soviet-held territory to ensure that only very limited supplies could be delivered to Warsaw. As a result, the uprising was brutally crushed by the Germans over a period of 63 days while the Soviets watched on (even after they had finally resumed their offensive and capturing the right bank the River Vistula in mid-September 1944). After the uprising, the Germans expelled the entire population from the city and spent the whole of October, November and December 1944 in looting Warsaw and destroying whatever was still standing while the Soviets continued to do nothing to intervene (they entered the ruins of the abandoned city only in January 1945 after they had waited for the Germans to leave).

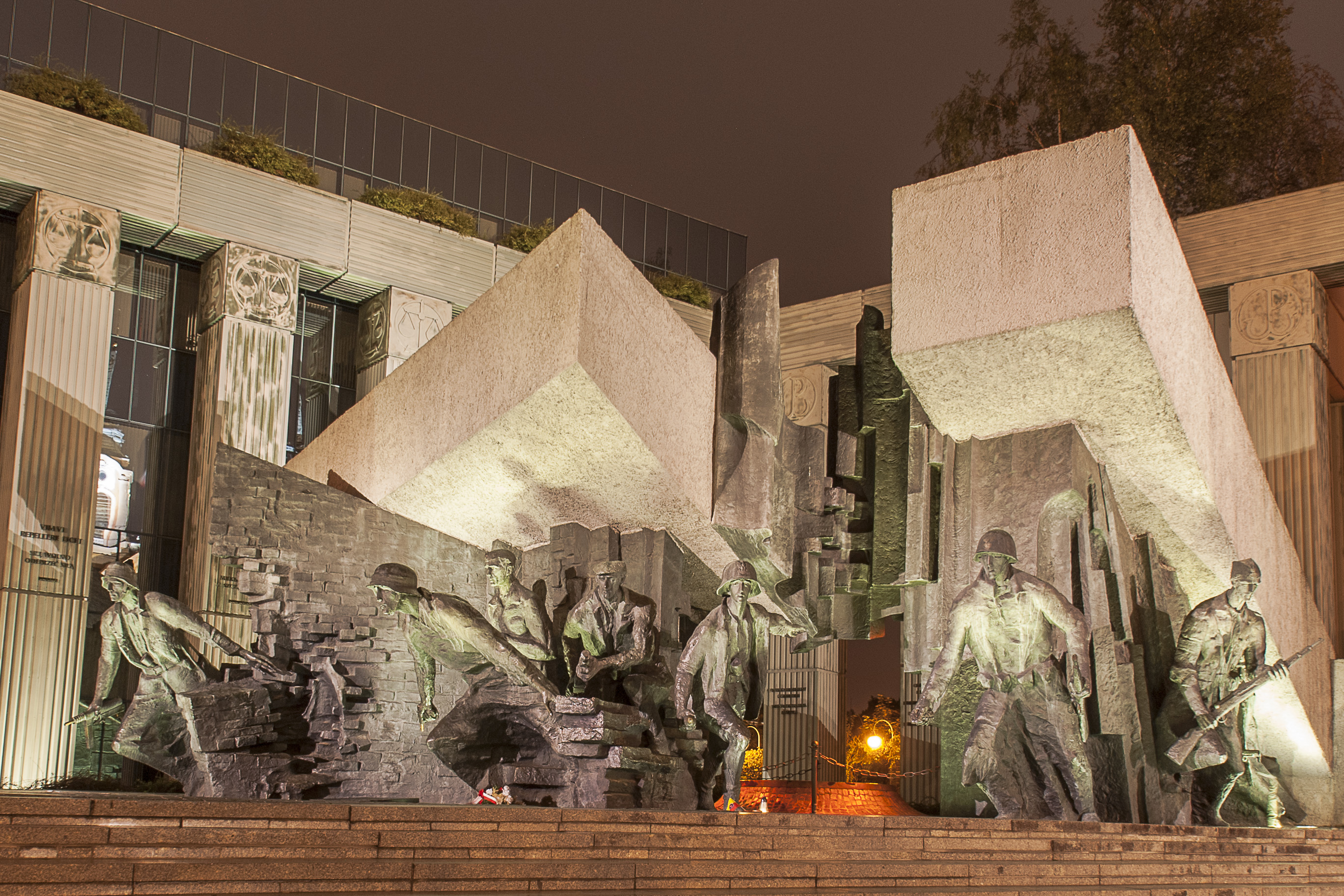
Main section of the monument

As a result, the significance of the uprising was downplayed for many years after the war, and the Home Army and the wartime Polish government-in-exile were condemned by communist propaganda. Such political factors made official memorialisation of the Warsaw Uprising impossible for decades, and subsequent debates about the form and location of the monument further delayed the project.

Poland's communist government finally gave permission to construct the monument on 12 April 1988. It was unveiled on 1 August 1989, the 45th anniversary of the Uprising. The monument was designed by sculptor Wincenty Kućma and architect Jacek Budyn.

The monument was visited by German president Roman Herzog on 1994, who paid tribute to the Poles and gave a speech about German shame in context of Nazi Germany's crimes during the Second World War in Poland. Herzog apologized to the Poles during his speech about war crimes.

== Description ==
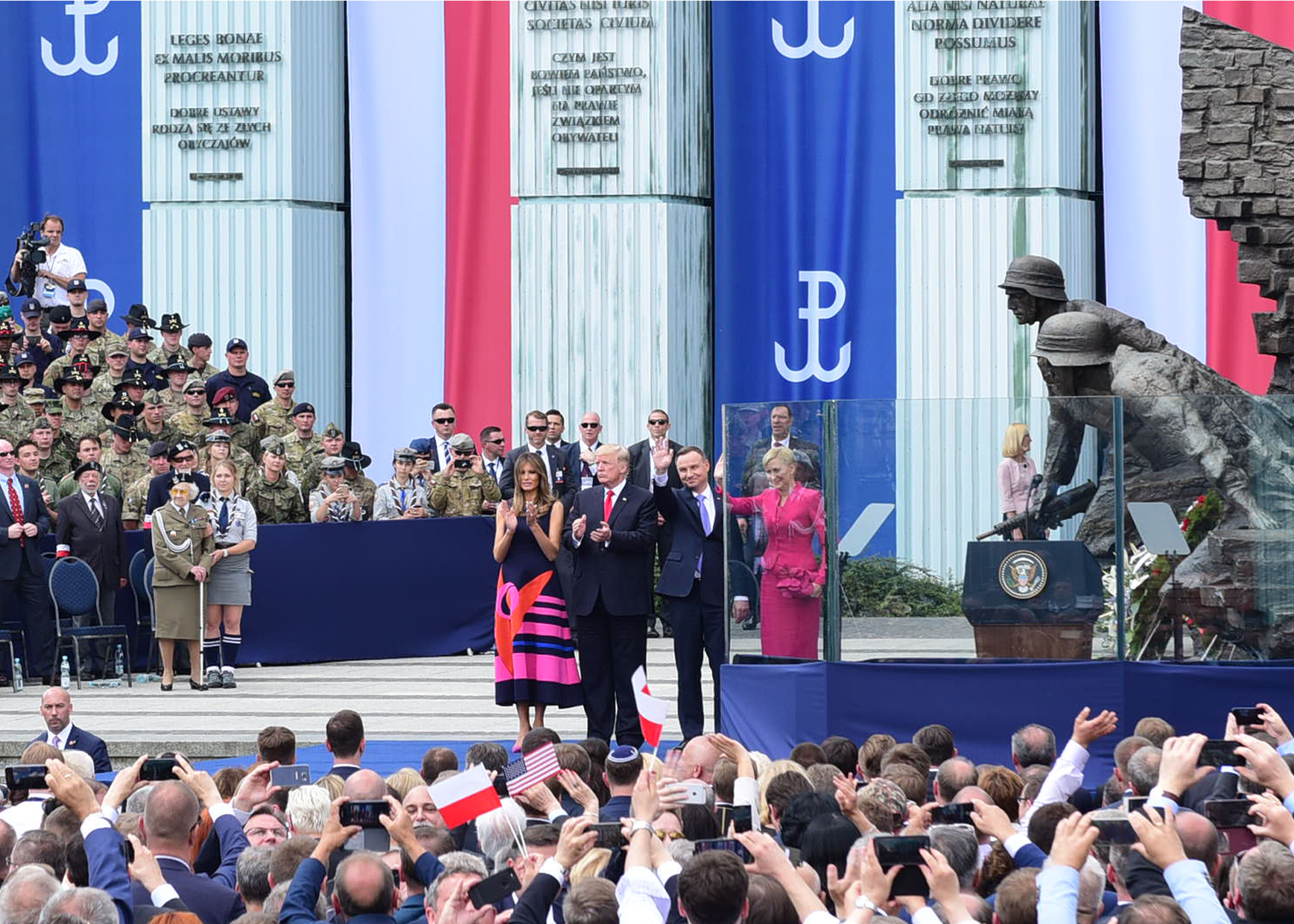
Presidents Donald Trump and Andrzej Duda at the Warsaw Uprising Monument, 2017

The monument is on the southern side of Krasiński Square. In 1999, the building of the Supreme Court of Poland was constructed in the area directly behind it.

The monument is made of bronze and is about 10 metres (33 ft) tall. It has two parts near each other. The larger, elevated element shows a group of insurgents actively engaged in combat, running from the artistic vision of a collapsing building, represented by a more abstract composition. The smaller element shows insurgents descending into a manhole, a reference to the use of Warsaw's sewer system by the insurgents to move across German-held territory during the uprising and specifically to the evacuation of 5300 resistance fighters from Warsaw's Old Town to the city centre at the beginning of September 1944, a five-hour journey which started from Krasiński Square. There is a small plaque across the road from the monument at the intersection of Długa and Miodowa Streets (the plaque is actually on Pl. Krasinskich 1–5). There is a brick pathway leading from the plaque out to the street to the manhole that was used to escape.

The realistic style of the monument has been favourably compared to a still from a movie or a historical painting by Jan Matejko, but has been also criticised for its socrealist style. There have also been critical voices saying that the monument is "defeatist" and that it was a gesture of reconciliation by the passing communist government that came many years too late. A 2013 analysis suggests that the monument is in need of renovation, particularly for its deterioration caused by atmospheric pollutants.

According to the authors, it is a part of a memorial triptych, the other two parts of which are the Monument to the Defenders of the Polish Post Office (pl) in Gdańsk and the Monument to the Fallen in Defense of the Homeland (pl) in Częstochowa.

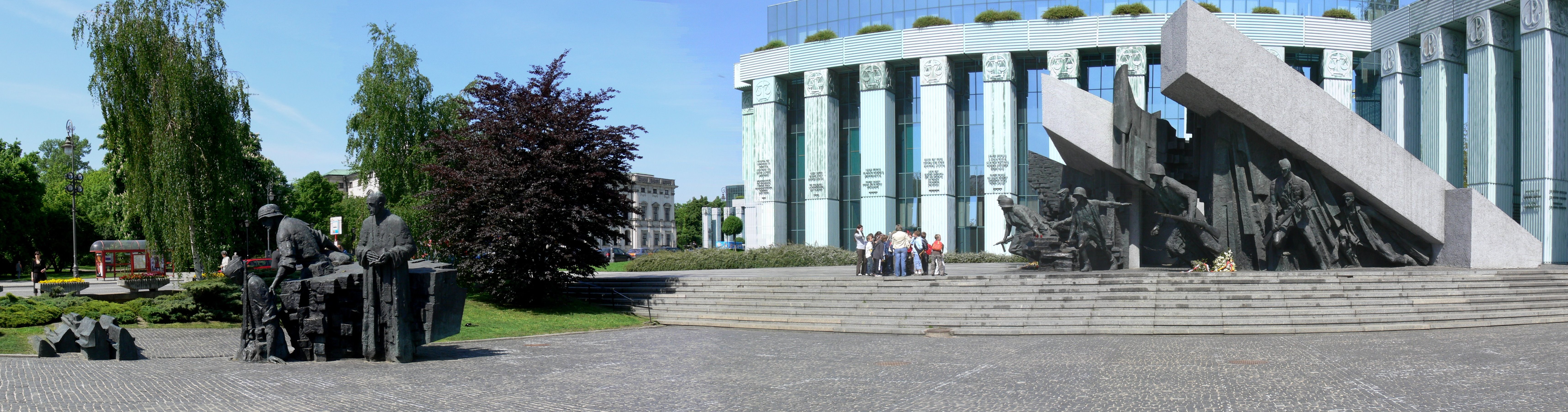
Panoramic view of the monument from the eastern corner.

== See also ==
- Home Army
- Polish resistance movement in World War II
- Warsaw Uprising Museum
- Warsaw Insurgents Cemetery
- The Little Insurrectionist
- Warsaw Uprising Memorial (Hamburg)
- Monument to the Women of the Warsaw Uprising
- Warsaw Insurgents Monument
- Warsaw Ghetto Uprising
- Monument to Victims of the Wola Massacre
- Monument to the Ghetto Heroes (with which the Warsaw Uprising Monument is often confused)
