= Timeline of the first Trump presidency (2017 Q2) =

The following is a timeline of the first presidency of Donald Trump during the second quarter of 2017, from April 1 to June 30, 2017. For a complete itinerary of his travels, see List of presidential trips made by Donald Trump (2017). To navigate between quarters, see timeline of the Donald Trump presidencies. For the Q3 timeline see timeline of the first Trump presidency (2017 Q3).

== Overview ==
=== Economy ===
Real GDP growth increased at an annual rate of 2.6%, up from a slow 0.7% in the preceding quarter. This was due to a smaller decrease in private inventory investment, an acceleration in PCE, and an upswing in federal government spending. These gains were offset by decreases in exports and fixed investments. On June 30, 2017, the U.S. national debt stood at $19.84 trillion, representing a quarterly decline of approximately 0.01% and a decline of approximately 0.46% since President Trump's inauguration.

=== Public opinion ===
According to FiveThirtyEight, President Trump concluded this quarter with an approval rating of 39.9%, representing a quarterly decline of 0.6%, and a decline of 5.6% since his inauguration.

== Timeline ==
=== April 2017 ===
Date	Events	Photos/videos
Saturday, April 1	Vice President Mike Pence delivers a speech in Reynoldsburg, Ohio, remarking on his continuing support for Supreme Court nominee Neil Gorsuch and indicating the campaign to repeal and replace the Affordable Care Act remains ongoing.; President Trump announces his intent to nominate Mark Green as Secretary of the Army.; James Mattis, the Secretary of Defense, visits the International Institute for Strategic Studies (IISS) in London.	Mattis speaks with members of the IISS
Sunday, April 2	A federal judge rules that before his presidency, Trump may have incited violence at a 2016 rally in Kentucky.; Trump remarks in an interview that the United States may take action against North Korea's nuclear missile program independently of China.; Trump discusses healthcare reform with Senator Rand Paul and White House budget director Mick Mulvaney at the Trump National Golf Club in Virginia.; Jared Kushner travels to Iraq over the weekend with Joseph Dunford, the chairman of the Joint Chiefs of Staff.	
Monday, April 3	Trump holds a bilateral meeting with Abdel Fattah el-Sisi, the president of Egypt, at the White House, praising his leadership and offering continuing support for Egypt's anti-terrorism measures.; Trump speaks by telephone with Vladimir Putin, the president of Russia, to offer a message of support following a fatal terrorist bombing on the Saint Petersburg Metro.; Trump signs a congressional resolution allowing internet service providers to collect and sell their customers' online usage history with greater ease. He also signs three other bills.; Trump orders an end to all US funding for the United Nations Population Fund.; Trump signs a memorandum to reform the Military Selective Service Process.; Trump proclaims the start of National Crime Victims' Rights Week.; Press Secretary Sean Spicer announces the donation of Trump's full quarterly salary ($78,333.32) to the National Park Service, following planned cuts.; The Department of the Interior proposes repealing the Consolidated Federal Oil & Gas and Federal & Indian Coal Valuation Reform Rule.; John F. Kelly, the Secretary of Homeland Security, meets with Salvadoran Foreign Minister Hugo Martínez and Guillermo Gallegos, the president of the Legislative Assembly.	Trump and Sisi
Tuesday, April 4	The Congressional Review Act removes a requirement for employers to collect accurate records on workplace accidents.; The Department of Justice orders a review of consent decrees meant to limit police brutality.; Trump delivers a speech to North America's Building Trades Unions (NABTU) at the Washington Hilton, reiterating his intention to remove construction regulations and highlighting his approval of the new phase of the Keystone Pipeline.; Following a chemical attack in Syria which kills numerous civilians, Trump calls the attack "reprehensible" and criticizes the Obama administration for not doing more to regulate chemical weapons.; North Korea launches a medium-range ballistic missile into the Sea of Japan. Rex Tillerson, the US Secretary of State, responds by saying the US has not changed its stance and does not comment further.; Reed Cordish, the assistant to the president for intergovernmental and technology initiatives, chairs a meeting at the White House for business leaders, attended by Trump and Pence.; Trump directs emergency grazing on Conservation Reserve Program lands located in Kansas, Oklahoma and Texas, the three states most heavily impacted by ongoing wildfires which began on March 6, 2017.; The Department of Labor responds to Trump's February 3 memorandum concerning the Fiduciary Duty Rule.; The Department of State cuts funding to the UN Population Fund, a fund focused on reproductive health and family planning.; The Justice and Labor departments cancel quarterly conference calls with LGBT organizations.	Tillerson with King Abdullah II of Jordan
Wednesday, April 5	Trump holds a bilateral meeting and joint press conference with King Abdullah II of Jordan at the White House, pledging to assist Jordan in eradicating ISIS and in promoting peace between Israel and Palestine.; Trump removes Steve Bannon from his position on the National Security Council.; Trump suggests without evidence that Susan Rice, former National Security Advisor, may have committed a crime by seeking the names of the members of her team who may have been incidentally mentioned on the intercepted communications of foreigners. Rice denies the charge.; Trump issues a presidential proclamation to honor the memory of John Glenn.	A joint press conference between Trump and Abdullah
Thursday, April 6	Trump orders a missile strike on the Shayrat Air Base in Homs, Syria, using 59 Tomahawk cruise missiles in retaliation for the chemical weapons attack on April 4. The strike is the first targeted attack by the US military on Ba'athist Syrian government forces since the war began. Delivering a statement at Mar-a-Lago, Trump declares an intent to protect American national security by deterring the use of chemical weaponry.; The Republican Party changes the rules of the Senate in order to confirm Neil Gorsuch, requiring only 51 votes instead of the previous 60.; Xi Jinping, the president of China, is met at Palm Beach International Airport by Secretary of State Tillerson. Shortly afterward, he is escorted to Mar-a-Lago where Trump greets him upon arrival prior to a formal dinner.; House Intelligence Committee Chairman Devin Nunes recuses himself from the investigation into Russian interference in the 2016 elections and is replaced by Mike Conaway, after he is placed under investigation for possibly disclosing classified information without authorization by the House Ethics Committee.; The Department of Labor delays the enforcement of OSHA's Crystalline Silica Rule by three months.; Ryan Zinke, the Secretary of the Interior, appoints Aurelia Skipwith Giacometto as Deputy Assistant Secretary for Fish, Wildlife and Parks, and Katharine MacGregor as Deputy Assistant Secretary for Land and Minerals Management.; Trump proclaims April 7 as Education and Sharing Day.	Trump announces the missile strike against Syria
Friday, April 7	Trump and Chinese president Xi continue talks during the second day at Mar-a-Lago, concerning trade and North Korea. Xi leaves on schedule later the same day.; At an emergency meeting of the United Nations Security Council in New York City, Nikki Haley, the ambassador to the UN, warns that the US is prepared to take further action in Syria and criticizes Russia and Iran for aiding the regime of Bashar al-Assad, the president of Syria.; The Senate confirms Neil Gorsuch as an Associate Justice of the Supreme Court in a vote of 54–45, presided over by Pence.; The Department of Homeland Security orders Twitter to reveal the identity of a user after their account had been critical of Trump and was suspected of working for the government.; Trump proclaims April 14 as Pan American Day, April 9–15 as Pan American Week and April 9 as National Former Prisoner of War Recognition Day, 2017.	Trump and Melania Trump, the US First Lady, with Xi and Peng Liyuan, the first lady of China
Saturday, April 8	Trump sends a letter of notification to Congress concerning his recent missile strike against Syrian-government forces and indicating the possibility of further action.; Trump speaks by telephone with Hwang Kyo-ahn, the acting president of South Korea.	
Sunday, April 9	Trump issues a statement on Twitter condemning a pair of fatal terrorist bombings in the Egyptian cities of Tanta and Alexandria and expressing his confidence in President Sisi's ability to respond.; In an interview with CBS, Secretary of State Tillerson suggests that the US position and that of China on the North Korean nuclear program are growing increasingly aligned.; The Trump administration announces that a Navy battle group headed by the aircraft carrier USS Carl Vinson (CVN-70), diverting from plans to visit Australian ports, is moving toward the Korean Peninsula. This statement is later questioned following the publication four days later of photographs of the carrier off the coast of Indonesia en route to the Indian Ocean.; K. T. McFarland is asked to step down as Deputy National Security Adviser to become the US Ambassador to Singapore.	
Monday, April 10	Trump conducts discussions on the ongoing Syrian civil war by telephone with Theresa May, the prime minister of Britain, and Angela Merkel, the chancellor of Germany.; Secretary of State Tillerson attends a G7 meeting in Lucca, Italy. Secretary of Energy Perry is in Rome for a G7 Energy ministerial meeting.; Elaine Duke is sworn in as deputy secretary for the Department of Homeland Security.; Trump attends the swearing in of Neil Gorsuch as an Associate Justice of the Supreme Court in a Rose Garden ceremony.	Gorsuch's swearing-in ceremony
Tuesday, April 11	The White House accuses Russia of attempting to cover up the Khan Shaykhun chemical attack with the use of disinformation tactics.; Meeting with bankers and chief executives, Trump reiterates his pledge to reform or replace the rules imposed on Wall Street following the 2008 financial crisis.; Secretary of State Tillerson declares in advance of a visit to Moscow that the rule of the Assad family is ending.; Press Secretary Spicer makes a televised apology following controversial remarks made at a White House press briefing concerning Adolf Hitler and the use of chemical weapons.; Trump allegedly asks James Comey, the director of the Federal Bureau of Investigation (FBI), to announce that the FBI was not investigating him.; Betsy DeVos, the Secretary of Education, formally withdraws a pair of memoranda from the Obama administration which required the office of Federal Student Aid to increase help for Student Loan debtors.	
Wednesday, April 12	Trump holds a bilateral meeting and joint press conference with Jens Stoltenberg, the secretary general of NATO, at the White House, responding to perceived structural changes within the organization by retracting his prior accusations of NATO's obsolescence.; Secretary of State Tillerson meets Russian foreign minister Sergey Lavrov in Moscow. At a joint press conference, they agree to improve their relations with bilateral dialogue. Tillerson later meets with President Putin at the Kremlin.; Secretary of Education DeVos rolls back student debt repayment protections.; Trump indicates three major economic policy reversals: that he would no longer label China as a currency manipulator, that he no longer wants to eliminate the Import–Export Bank and that he may consider reappointing Janet Yellen as chairwoman of the Federal Reserve.; Trump and Budget Director Mulvaney lift the federal hiring freeze.	A joint press conference between Trump and Stoltenberg
Thursday, April 13	Trump says, "North Korea is a problem. The problem will be taken care of", expressing confidence that Chinese president Xi will solve the problem. Trump issues a tweet stating that if China fails to resolve the issue, the US and its allies will instead.; A MOAB bomb is dropped on an ISIS cave complex in Nangarhar Province, Afghanistan, the same province where Staff Sergeant Mark De Alencar of 7th Special Forces Group was killed on April 8.; The Department of the Treasury launches sanctions against ISIS suppliers and organizations of abusive prisons in Iran.; Trump signs a bill into law nullifying a pending federal regulation that would have disallowed states to withhold money from abortion providers.; Environmental Protection Agency (EPA) administrator Scott Pruitt announces sweeping "back-to-basics agenda" at the Harvey Mine in Sycamore, Pennsylvania. The agency announces plans to reconsider the ELG rule which aims to reduce steam electric power plant pollutants.	Footage of the MOAB bomb being dropped in Afghanistan
Friday, April 14	The Trump administration verifies it will discontinue the practice of voluntarily releasing the White House visitors' log, following the filing of a federal-court lawsuit on April 10 by a group of organizations including CREW, demanding the publication of such material under the Freedom of Information Act.; Trump signs a bill allowing states to withhold funding from Planned Parenthood.; Trump meets with two former Colombian presidents at Mar-a-Lago to discuss the Colombian peace process.; Mike Pompeo, the director of the CIA, indicates that the US may be willing to take tougher action against Iran in light of international security concerns over Iran's nuclear program.; Under Secretary of State Shannon meets with Mark P. Long of Western Digital.; The Department of the Treasury sanctions an Al-Nusra Front and Al-Qaeda facilitator and two Central African Republic militia commanders.; Trump proclaims April 15–23, 2017, as National Park Week.; The Department of Justice issues a two-sentence court filing, saying it has dropped its lawsuit over North Carolina's "bathroom bill".	
Saturday, April 15	Tax Day March rallies are held throughout the US. Trump responds the following day in two tweets, saying "the election is over".	Tax Day March demonstrators on Minnesota State Capitol grounds
Sunday, April 16	Trump claims that protests against him were paid for.; Pence arrives in South Korea at the start of an Asia-Pacific diplomatic tour. Speaking in Seoul, Pence denounces as a "provocation" a failed North Korean missile test carried out that morning and reiterates that the US is committed to South Korean defense.	
Monday, April 17	Trump calls Recep Tayyip Erdoğan, the president of Turkey, to congratulate his victory in a referendum increasing his powers, despite the State Department questioning the democratic legitimacy of the poll.; Pence visits the Korean Demilitarized Zone near the South Korean city of Paju. In a statement to the press, Pence declares an end to the "era of strategic patience" concerning the North Korean missile program and demands that they abandon their nuclear ambitions.; Trump and First Lady Melania Trump participate in the White House Easter Egg Roll.	Trump and Melania attend the Easter Egg Roll
Tuesday, April 18	Trump visits the headquarters of tool manufacturer Snap-on in Kenosha, Wisconsin, to sign Executive Order 13788 which intends to prevent abuse of the H-1B visa program and to give preference to US-made products.; Secretary of Homeland Security Kelly says Trump's critics should "shut up and support the men and women on the front lines".; Pence arrives in Tokyo, Japan, as part of an Asia-Pacific tour.; Secretary of Defense Mattis travels to Saudi Arabia to discuss security in the region.	
Wednesday, April 19	Trump signs a bill into law extending the Veterans' Access to Care through Choice, Accountability, and Transparency Act of 2014.; Trump hosts the New England Patriots, the champions of Super Bowl LI, at the White House.; Pence delivers a speech aboard the USS Ronald Reagan (CVN-76) moored at Yokosuka, Japan, to 2,500 members of US and Japanese armed forces, condemning North Korea's threat to international security and stating America's "shield stands guard and sword stands ready".	Pence on the USS Ronald Reagan (CVN-76) docked in Yokosuka, Japan
Thursday, April 20	Trump signs a memorandum directing the Department of Commerce to begin an investigation on whether steel imports are a threat to US national security and another which provides initial reports on the implementation of the Global Magnitsky Human Rights Accountability Act.; Trump's lawyers argue that protesters at his rallies had "no rights" to "express dissenting views" as their First Amendment rights did not apply "as part of the campaign rally of the political candidates they oppose".; Trump holds a bilateral meeting and joint press conference with Paolo Gentiloni, the prime minister of Italy, at the White House.; Trump's self-imposed deadline for the production of a full White House report into Russian interference in the 2016 election expires unfulfilled.; Pence takes part in a joint press conference with Joko Widodo, the president of Indonesia, at the State Palace in Jakarta.; Secretary of Defense Mattis travels to Egypt to discuss security in the region and participates in a wreath-laying ceremony at the Unknown Soldier Memorial.	A joint press conference between Trump and Gentiloni
Friday, April 21	Trump signs one executive order and two memorandums. The executive order directs Steven Mnuchin, the Secretary of the Treasury, to review the US tax code to recommend unnecessary regulations to remove, and the two memorandums direct him to review portions of the Dodd–Frank Wall Street Reform and Consumer Protection Act.; On the final leg of his Asia-Pacific diplomatic tour, Pence is met at Sydney Airport by Barnaby Joyce, the deputy prime minister of Australia.; Trump appoints Rear Admiral Sylvia Trent-Adams as acting Surgeon General to replace Vivek Murthy.; Secretary of Defense Mattis visits Israel to meet with President Reuben Rivlin, Prime Minister Benjamin Netanyahu and Minister of Defense Avigdor Lieberman, and participates in a wreath-laying ceremony at the World Holocaust Remembrance Center.	Mattis meets with Netanyahu in Jerusalem
Saturday, April 22	Trump and First Lady Melania Trump visit the Walter Reed National Military Medical Center in Maryland to award the Purple Heart to Sergeant First Class Alvaro Barrientos.; Pence meets Malcolm Turnbull, the prime minister of Australia, at Kirribilli House. At a later joint press conference at Admiralty House, Pence says the US will honor a refugee deal with Australia, a deal Trump previously described as "dumb" and which led to a truncated phone call on February 1.; Secretary of Defense Mattis travels to Qatar to discuss security in the region.	The Pence family in Sydney, Australia
Sunday, April 23	In response to polls showing Trump has achieved the lowest approval rating of any president since 1945, he blames "fake news".; Trump issues a video address to coincide with Israel's Holocaust Memorial Day in which he condemns all antisemitism, past and present.; Jeff Sessions, the Attorney General, says that DREAMers are subject to deportation.; Secretary of Defense Mattis travels to Djibouti to meet with President Ismaïl Omar Guelleh to discuss security in the region.	Pence and Peter Cosgrove, the governor-general of Australia, in front of the Sydney Opera House
Monday, April 24	It is revealed that Michael Flynn, a former National Security Advisor, had failed to disclose a $33,000 payment from Russia Today while in the Trump's service.; The Anti-Defamation League reports an 86% rise in antisemitic attacks since Trump's inauguration.; Pence completes his tour of the Asia-Pacific with an address to 200 US troops and officials at Pago Pago, American Samoa, followed by a brief stop at Joint Base Pearl Harbor–Hickam in Hawaii during his return to Washington DC.; Treasury Secretary Mnuchin announces new sanctions against the Syrian government in response to the chemical weapons attack on April 4.; The Senate confirms Sonny Perdue as the 31st Secretary of Agriculture in a vote of 87–11.; The Department of Commerce orders a 20% tariff on lumber imports from Canada, worth about $1 billion.	Trump speaks via video conference with Peggy Whitson, the chief astronaut of NASA, to congratulate her for breaking the record for most time in space of any American astronaut
Tuesday, April 25	Trump publicly suggests breaking up the United States Court of Appeals for the Ninth Circuit after it blocks his defunding of sanctuary cities.; Sonny Perdue is sworn in as the 31st secretary of agriculture.; Trump speaks at the US Capitol for the Holocaust Memorial Museum (USHMM) "Days of Remembrance" event.; Trump signs Executive Order 13790, which instructs the secretary of agriculture to chair an interagency task force to examine legislative, regulatory and policy changes in support of rural areas.; William Orrick III, a US district judge, issues a preliminary injunction blocking Trump's Executive Order 13768, signed January 25, which ordered the withholding of federal funds from cities which refuse to comply with federal immigration enforcement measures.	Perdue attends a farmer's roundtable on his first day in office
Wednesday, April 26	Trump welcomes the Senate to the Eisenhower Executive Office Building prior to their briefing with the secretaries of defense and state, the director of national intelligence and the chairman of the Joint Chiefs of Staff on the issue of North Korea. Pence and the four officials brief the House of Representatives at the US Capitol Complex later in the day.; Treasury Secretary Mnuchin and Gary Cohn release Trump's tax-reform outline plan, the proposals of which include among other items a cut in the rate of business tax from 35% to 15%, a simplification of the tax system by reducing seven existing tax brackets to three and the elimination of the alternative minimum tax.; Trump signs Executive Orders 13791 and 13792 which review public schools and national monuments.; Secretary of State Tillerson and Secretary of Defense Mattis lead a briefing on North Korea for members of the House and Senate.	Trump signs Executive Order 13792 at the Department of the Interior
Thursday, April 27	Speaking at the Oval Office, Trump praises Chinese president Xi's diplomacy with North Korea but warns of the continuing possibility of a "major, major conflict".; Trump holds a bilateral meeting with Mauricio Macri, the president of Argentina, at the White House.; A renewed attempt to secure a congressional vote on Trump's plan to repeal and replace the Affordable Care Act is abandoned.; The Senate confirms Alex Acosta as the 28th secretary of labor in a vote of 60–38.	Trump and Macri
Friday, April 28	Alex Acosta is sworn in as the 28th secretary of labor.; At the Georgia World Congress Center in Atlanta, Trump delivers the first presidential address to the National Rifle Association of America since 1983, reiterating his guarantee of the Second Amendment.; The EPA removes all references to climate change from their website.; Speaking at a meeting of the UN Security Council, Secretary of State Tillerson calls for support from the international community to limit the North Korean missile program, warning that the US mainland may soon be in range and that inaction could have "catastrophic consequences".	UN ambassador Haley and Tillerson with Jeffrey D. Feltman, the under-secretary-general of the UN, prior to chairing a UN Security Council meeting
Saturday, April 29	North Korea conducts another missile test from Bukchang which fails shortly after liftoff. Trump condemns the action as an insult to China.; Trump falsely claims that the new Republican healthcare bill would protect health insurance for those with preexisting conditions.; Trump speaks by telephone with Rodrigo Duterte, the president of the Philippines, to discuss North Korea, following a series of missile tests. He invites Duterte to meet him at the White House, drawing criticism from international human rights organizations due to concerns regarding the latter's drug war.; Trump forgoes a White House Correspondents' Association dinner in favor of an evening political rally in Harrisburg, Pennsylvania, with Pence and various cabinet members, to mark the first 100 days of his first administration.	Trump and Pence on their way to the Pennsylvania Farm Show Complex & Expo Center for Trump's 100th-day rally
Sunday, April 30	CBS publishes an interview from April 29 in which Trump suggests that China may have been responsible for the 2016 Democratic National Committee email leak.; Trump extends an invitation to Philippine president Duterte to visit the White House.	

=== May 2017 ===
Date	Events	Photos/videos
Monday, May 1	In an interview with Bloomberg News, President Trump expresses an openness to meet with North Korean leader Kim Jong-un under the right circumstances.; The Trump international Hotel in Washington D.C. receives $30,000 from a Turkish interest group.; The president ends an interview when pressed on evidence of being wiretapped by Obama.; The president praises Andrew Jackson, organiser of the Trail of Tears, during an interview, saying he had "a big heart".; Press Secretary Spicer confirms that Congress is currently under whip in preparation for a new attempt to secure a vote on President Trump's plan to repeal and replace the Affordable Care Act.; The White House defunds Let Girls Learn, a program initiated by former first lady Michelle Obama.; The Department of Agriculture abandons Obama-era standards for healthier school lunches.	
Tuesday, May 2	President Trump speaks by telephone with Russian President Vladimir Putin for the first time since the Khan Shaykhun chemical attack. They discuss the ongoing Syrian Civil War, Middle Eastern terrorism, and issues concerning the North Korean nuclear missile program, and agree to meet in person.; The president refers to the separation of powers as an "archaic" system.; In a pair of tweets, President Trump suggests the abandonment of existing supermajority voting rules in the Senate, in favor of the principle of simple majority.; Secretary of State Tillerson delivers remarks at the Model United Nations Conference at the State Department.; The president appoints Teresa Manning, an anti-abortion activist, in charge of family planning for low-income people.; The Department of Health and Human Services announces a plan to roll back regulations interpreting the Affordable Care Act's nondiscrimination provisions to protect transgender people.	Secretary of Defense Mattis meets with Czech Minister of Defence Martin Stropnický
Wednesday, May 3	President Trump holds a bilateral meeting and joint press conference with Palestinian President Mahmoud Abbas at the White House.	President Trump and Palestinian President Abbas
Thursday, May 4	President Trump holds a bilateral meeting with Australian Prime Minister Malcolm Turnbull at the Intrepid Sea, Air & Space Museum, in Trump's first return to New York since his inauguration.; Vice President Pence speaks at a Cinco de Mayo celebration at the Eisenhower Executive Office Building.; The House of Representatives votes 217–213 in favor of repealing and replacing major parts of the Affordable Care Act.; Environmental Protection Agency (EPA) Administrator Pruitt recuses himself from a number of lawsuits which he had helped to bring against the EPA.	President Trump and Australian Prime Minister Malcolm Turnbull
Friday, May 5	Mark Green withdraws from President Trump's nomination for the position of Secretary of the Army following prior controversial remarks made by Green concerning Muslims and concerning the LGBT community.; At least five scientists on the Board of Scientific Counselors are informed by the Environmental Protection Agency that their terms will not be renewed.	
Saturday, May 6	Sister of Jared Kushner, the president's advisor and son-in-law, solicits investments from Chinese business owners in return for American visas.	
Sunday, May 7	President Trump tweets a message of congratulation to Emmanuel Macron following his victory over Marine Le Pen in the French presidential election.	
Monday, May 8	President Trump and French president-elect Emmanuel Macron speak by telephone and arrange to meet during a NATO summit scheduled for 25 May in Belgium.; President Trump issues a series of tweets which describe allegations of collusion with Russia as a hoax, and which suggest that the ongoing investigations are a waste of taxpayers' money.; Former acting attorney general Sally Yates and former director of national intelligence James Clapper testify before the Senate Judiciary Committee's Crime and Terrorism subcommittee about Russian interference in the 2016 presidential election. Yates asserts that the Trump administration knew that former National Security Advisor Michael T. Flynn was vulnerable to Russian blackmail at least 18 days before he was dismissed. Clapper says he was unaware of the FBI investigation into Russian electoral interference during his tenure.; The EPA fires half the scientists on its advisory board.; White House officials call the office of Justin Trudeau in a bid to prevent an executive order from cancelling NAFTA.; Secretary of Defense Mattis visits Copenhagen, to meet with representatives from 15 countries leading the campaign against ISIS. Mattis also meets Danish minister of defense Claus Hjort Frederiksen to discuss European security and NATO alliance, and Prime Minister Lars Løkke Rasmussen to re-affirm the close ties between Denmark and the U.S.	Vice President Pence participates in an honor flight reception in the Indian Treaty Room.
Tuesday, May 9	President Trump removes James Comey from his position as FBI Director. The White House explains that it is acting on the recommendation of Deputy Attorney General Rod Rosenstein and Attorney General Sessions, citing Comey's public statements about the Clinton email investigation as the reason for the decision.; Andrew G. McCabe becomes acting director of the FBI.; In an interview with CNN, President Trump's Counselor Kellyanne Conway denies that Comey's dismissal is part of a White House cover-up.; Journalist Dan Heyman is arrested after questioning Secretary of Health and Human Services Tom Price.; Secretary of State Tillerson signs an agreement that expands the sharing of intelligence between the U.S. and Georgia.	Secretary of Defense Mattis attends a Global Coalition on the Defeat of ISIS meeting at Eigtveds Pakhus in Copenhagen, Denmark.
Wednesday, May 10	Following a separate meeting between Russian foreign minister Sergey Lavrov and Secretary of State Tillerson at the State Department earlier in the day, President Trump meets with Lavrov and Russian ambassador Sergey Kislyak in the Oval Office; a meeting at which Trump divulges classified information. He also notes to them that "I faced great pressure because of Russia. That's taken off."; President Trump meets with former secretary of state Henry Kissinger at the White House.; Vice President Pence describes Trump's dismissal of James Comey as "the right decision at the right time".; Secretary of Defense Mattis attends the Somalia Conference in London.	President Trump speaks with Russian Foreign Minister Sergey Lavrov in the Oval Office.
Thursday, May 11	President Trump signs an executive order to initiate an investigation of allegations of voter fraud during the 2016 U.S. presidential election, under a commission to be chaired by Vice President Pence. Kansas Secretary of State Kris Kobach, a prominent proponent of strict voter ID laws, is appointed vice-chair and will administer day-to-day operations.; In an interview with NBC, President Trump explains that he had decided to dismiss James Comey prior to and without regard to a recommendation from the attorney general's office. He also reveals of his reasoning that: "Then I decided to just do it, said to myself, I said: This Russia thing with Trump and Russia is a made-up story, it's an excuse by the Democrats for having lost an election that they should’ve won."; Vice President Pence delivers a speech to a Billy Graham Evangelistic Association meeting at the Mayflower Hotel in Washington D.C., calling for ISIS attacks on Christians to be labeled "genocide".; Secretary of State Tillerson attends an Arctic Council meeting in Fairbanks, Alaska.	Secretary of Defense Mattis and Under Secretary Shannon attend the London Somalia Conference at the Lancaster House.
Friday, May 12	President Trump suggests on Twitter and in an interview broadcast on 13 May the possibility of ceasing the practice of White House press briefings in favor of written statements.; President Trump tweets a warning to Comey that he ought to "hope that there are no 'tapes' of our conversations before he starts leaking to the press". When questioned at the daily briefing, Press Secretary Spicer does not confirm or deny that conversations at the White House have been recorded.; A law firm finds after reviewing ten years of the president's tax returns that with a "few exceptions", he has no financial ties to Russia.; Vice President Pence visits Billings, Montana to campaign for Greg Gianforte in the special election for Montana's congressional seat.	
Saturday, May 13	The EPA announces an end to mining restrictions on Alaskan headwaters.; At Virginia's Liberty University, President Trump delivers his first college commencement speech as sitting president, with the theme of perseverance. During the graduation speech he was awarded an Honorary Doctor of Laws degree.	Attorney General Sessions and Secretary of Homeland Security Kelly attend a candlelight vigil for officers killed in the line of duty.
Sunday, May 14	The White House describes North Korea as a "flagrant menace" in response to the test-launch of a missile from near Kusung into the Sea of Japan.	
Monday, May 15	President Trump delivers a speech at the 36th Annual National Peace Officers' Memorial Service at the Capitol Building, reiterating his support for the police service.; President Trump hosts the crown prince of Abu Dhabi, Mohammed bin Zayed Al Nahyan, at the White House.; National Security Advisor H.R. McMaster and Secretary of State Tillerson issue denials to allegations that President Trump shared certain classified information with Lavrov and Kislyak on May 10, 2017.; Three 9th Circuit judges hold a hearing in Seattle, Washington, for arguments relating to President Trump's currently barred travel ban.	President Trump and Vice President Pence among others at the 36th Annual National Peace Officers' Memorial Service
Tuesday, May 16	President Trump holds a bilateral meeting and joint press conference with Turkish President Recep Tayyip Erdoğan at the White House.; President Trump issues a pair of tweets explaining that he has a right to share information with Russia for counter-terrorism reasons.; National Security Advisor McMaster holds a White House press briefing at which he describes the President's conversation with Lavrov and Kislyak as "wholly appropriate".; The White House issues a denial that President Trump asked Comey on February 14, 2017, to end the FBI investigation into Michael Flynn. House Oversight Committee Chair Jason Chaffetz requests from the FBI all material on Comey's meetings with Trump.	President Trump and Turkish President Recep Tayyip Erdoğan
Wednesday, May 17	President Trump delivers the commencement address at the Coast Guard Academy in New London, Connecticut, with a speech on the theme of persistence, claiming that “No politician—and I say this with great surety—has been treated worse or more unfairly."; Vice President Pence becomes the first sitting vice president to form a political action committee, filing paperwork to create the Great America Committee.; Deputy Attorney General Rosenstein appoints Robert Mueller as a special prosecutor to investigate alleged Russian interference in the 2016 presidential election. According to reporting by The New York Times in January 2018, President Trump attempts to dismiss Mueller before the end of June, but retreats upon the threatened resignation of White House counsel Don McGahn.	President Trump delivers the commencement address to 199 cadets during the 136th U.S. Coast Guard Academy Commencement.
Thursday, May 18	President Trump holds a bilateral meeting and joint press conference with Colombian President Juan Manuel Santos at the White House.; At the press conference, President Trump denies telling Comey to end the FBI investigation into Michael Flynn, denies any collusion between his campaign and Russia, and reiterates his claim that he is the subject of a "witch hunt".; Vice President Pence denies that he knew prior to March 2017 that Flynn was under federal investigation.; White House Director of Communications, Michael Dubke, resigns, agreeing to continue in his position at least until the end of President Trump's upcoming foreign visit.; Following a private Senate briefing by Deputy Attorney General Rosenstein, three senators confirm that Rosenstein believed President Trump planned to dismiss Comey prior to Rosenstein's recommendation.	President Trump and Colombian President Juan Manel Santos
Friday, May 19	President Trump leaves Washington D.C. for Saudi Arabia on his first official foreign tour.; The White House does not dispute reports that President Trump called former FBI Director Comey a "nut job" and said that firing him "relieved pressure" in a meeting with Russian officials. Press Secretary Spicer accuses Comey of "grandstanding" and impeding the relationship with Russia.; There are reportedly still 700 unfilled positions at the Centers for Disease Control and Prevention.	
Saturday, May 20	President Trump is received in Riyadh by Salman bin Abdulaziz Al Saud and is awarded Saudi Arabia's highest civilian honor, the Collar of Abdulaziz Al Saud.; President Trump signs an arms deal worth more than $350 billion and various other investment agreements with Saudi Arabia.	President Trump and First Lady Melania Trump arrive at the Murabba Palace.
Sunday, May 21	President Trump suggests cutting US$1.7 trillion over ten years from redistributive programs such as food stamps and Medicaid.; President Trump delivers a speech to more than fifty leaders of Muslim-majority nations at an Arab Islamic American Summit at the king Abdulaziz Conference Centre in Riyadh, condemning the alleged funding of terrorism by Iran.; President Trump holds several bilateral meetings with the Egyptian President Abdel Fattah el-Sisi, King Hamad bin Isa Al Khalifa of Bahrain and Emir Tamim bin Hamad Al Thani of Qatar.; Vice President Pence delivers the commencement speech at the University of Notre Dame's graduation ceremony in South Bend, Indiana.	President Trump participates in the Arab Islamic American Summit in Riyadh.
Monday, May 22	Continuing his tour of the Middle East and Europe, President Trump is met in Tel Aviv by Israeli prime minister Netanyahu and President Reuven Rivlin. He visits the Church of the Holy Sepulchre in Jerusalem and becomes the first sitting U.S. president to visit the Western Wall.; Health insurance providers have raised premiums by up to 50% due to uncertainty surrounding the administration's stance towards the Affordable Care Act.	President Trump places his hand on the Western Wall in Jerusalem.
Tuesday, May 23	President Trump pays his respects at the Jewish Holocaust memorial Yad Vashem with Prime Minister Netanyahu.; President Trump visits Bethlehem in the West Bank to hold a bilateral meeting with Palestinian leader Mahmoud Abbas. Speaking to the press alongside Abbas, Trump condemns the fatal terrorist bombing of England's Manchester Arena on the previous night, calling the perpetrators "losers".; President Trump lands in Rome, Italy, in advance of a visit to the Vatican.; The White House publishes President Trump's first full budget proposal. Allocations include $1.6 billion for a Mexican border wall and a 10% increase in military spending. Reductions include an $800 billion cut to Medicaid, a $190 billion cut to food stamps, cuts to Meals on Wheels and drug treatment programs, and the elimination of student loan subsidies. The budget assumes economic growth of 3% to avoid adding to the deficit.	President Trump and Israeli Prime Minister Benjamin Netanyahu at the Israel Museum
Wednesday, May 24	President Trump meets privately with Pope Francis at Vatican City.; President Trump holds bilateral meetings with Italian president Sergio Mattarella and Prime Minister Paolo Gentiloni, praising Italy's efforts in combating terrorism.; President Trump flies in the afternoon to Brussels to meet with Belgian Prime Minister Charles Michel in advance of a NATO summit, following which he had an audience with Belgian King Philippe and Queen Mathilde.; Secretary of Housing and Urban development Ben Carson calls poverty "a state of mind".	President Trump and First Lady Melania Trump with Pope Francis
Thursday, May 25	President Trump meets with European Council President Donald Tusk and European Commission President Jean-Claude Juncker at the European Council headquarters.; During a NATO meeting, the president visibly pushes the Montenegrin Prime Minister Duško Marković during a photo-op.; President Trump hosts a lunch meeting with French president Emmanuel Macron at the U.S. ambassador's residence in Brussels.; At the new NATO headquarters President Trump unveils a memorial to the September 11 attacks. In a speech to NATO leaders, President Trump criticizes member states for their levels of defence spending and receives a commitment from NATO to formally join the international anti-ISIS coalition.; The federal appeals court in Richmond, Virginia, refuses to reinstate President Trump's travel ban, citing religious discrimination. The Justice Department declares an intent to appeal to the Supreme Court.	President Trump with European Commission President Jean-Claude Juncker and European Council President Donald Tusk
Friday, May 26	President Trump attends the 43rd G7 summit with world leaders of G7 in Taormina, Italy to discuss world issues such as trade, climate change and the migration crisis. Trump criticizes the large imports of German automobiles, pointing to the large U.S. trade deficit with Germany. Trump refuses to commit the U.S. to the Paris Agreement on climate change and cutting greenhouse emissions.; President Trump holds a bilateral meeting with Japanese prime minister Shinzō Abe to discuss the threat of North Korea's ballistic missile program.; Secretary of State Tillerson meets with Secretary Johnson in London with regards to the Manchester Arena bombing that occurred on May 22.	G7 leaders at the 43rd G7 summit
Saturday, May 27	President Trump continues discussions with G7 leaders on a whole range of issues, agreeing on a communique on fighting protectionism in international trade, but disagreeing with a majority of a leaders on endorsing the Paris climate change accord.; President Trump addresses American troops stationed in Italy at the Naval Air Station Sigonella before leaving for the U.S.; At a press briefing, National Security Advisor McMaster remarks that he "would not be concerned", when responding to questions about a recent report that Kushner had discussed with Kislyak the possibility of creating a secret communication channel between President Trump's team and the Kremlin.	President Trump speaks to U.S. service members at the Naval Air Station in Sigonella, Italy.
Sunday, May 28	President Trump issues an extended series of tweets, describing many recent White House leaks as 'fake news', and questioning the use of anonymous sources by the media.; President Trump is briefed on a new missile test-launch by North Korea, which is alleged to have discharged into waters within Japan's exclusive economic zone.; Answering questions concerning reports of an attempt by the Trump team to set up a secret line of communication with the Kremlin, Homeland Security Secretary Kelly states, "Any channel of communications, back or otherwise, is a good thing."	
Monday, May 29	President Trump performs a wreath-laying ceremony at the Tomb of the Unknown Soldier at the Arlington National Cemetery and gives a speech honoring those who have died fighting for the U.S., giving special mention to the fallen son of Homeland Security Secretary Kelly.; Vice President Pence hosts more than 200 bicycle-riders at the annual Project Hero Memorial Day Bike Ride at the vice president's residence.	President Trump delivers the Memorial Day address at Arlington National Cemetery.
Tuesday, May 30	President Trump reiterates on Twitter his proposal to abandon the Senate's tradition of supermajority voting, in order to accelerate legislation.; The resignation (tendered 18 May) of President Trump's director of communications, Michael Dubke, is confirmed.	
Wednesday, May 31	The White House grants ethics waivers to 17 senior officials.; President Trump holds a bilateral meeting with Vietnamese Prime Minister Nguyễn Xuân Phúc at the White House and oversees the signing of trade deals worth $17 billion.; The administration starts asking for five years of social media activity on visa applications.; The president uses the word covfefe in a tweet.; Press Secretary Spicer announces that all press questions concerning the ongoing investigation into the administration's alleged ties to Russia will henceforth be referred to President Trump's lawyer, Marc Kasowitz.; Secretary of Veteran Affairs David Shulkin gives a press briefing concerning problems facing his department.	

=== June 2017 ===
Date	Events	Photos/videos
Thursday, June 1	President Trump formally announces his intent to withdraw the U.S. from the 2015 Paris climate agreement, prompting criticism from former and serving world leaders and the United Nations. Tesla's Elon Musk and Disney CEO Bob Iger resign from the president's business advisory council in protest.; The Justice Department appeals to the Supreme Court to reinstate President Trump's travel ban.; President Trump signs the long-standing waiver resolving not to move the U.S. embassy in Israel from Tel Aviv to Jerusalem.	President Trump announces withdrawal from the Paris Agreement.
Friday, June 2	President Trump signs The American Law Enforcement Heroes Act to provide federal grants to those federal and state law enforcement agencies that hire and train veterans; and The Public Safety Officers' Benefits Improvement Act that reduces the backlog of families awaiting approval of survivor benefits of public safety officers killed in the line of duty.	
Saturday, June 3	President Trump issues a pair of tweets sending a message of support to the UK and promoting his administration's halted travel ban following a briefing on a major terrorist incident in London.	
Sunday, June 4	On Twitter, President Trump criticizes London Mayor Sadiq Khan's response to the terrorist incident, drawing condemnation from members of the UK's governing and opposition parties, including British prime minister Theresa May.; President Trump delivers an evening speech at the Ford's Theater's annual fundraising gala, remarking on international security questions and denouncing the London terror attack of June 3.	President Trump and First Lady Melania Trump at the Ford's Theater
Monday, June 5	The top American diplomat in China, David Rank, resigns in response to the country leaving the Paris Agreement.; President Trump announces plans to modernize and privatize the U.S. air traffic control system.; In a series of tweets, President Trump praises his initial "travel ban", and blames the Justice Department for the "watered-down" revised version he signed on March 6.; Speaking publicly during a diplomatic visit to Australia with Secretary of Defense Mattis, Secretary of State Tillerson suggests that China ought to take stronger action to prevent North Korea from developing a nuclear missile.	
Tuesday, June 6	President Trump claims credit for helping to instigate the recent severing of diplomatic ties by Saudi Arabia, Bahrain, the UAE, Yemen, eastern Libya and the Maldives with the state of Qatar over allegations of terrorist funding.; Secretary of State Tillerson arrives in Wellington, New Zealand, for bilateral talks with Prime Minister Bill English and Minister of Foreign Affairs Gerry Brownlee.; Press Secretary Spicer confirms that President Trump's tweets are to be "considered official statements by the President of the United States".	
Wednesday, June 7	President Trump announces his nomination of Christopher A. Wray for the directorship of the FBI.; President Trump gives a speech in Cincinnati, Ohio, detailing government plans to overhaul the nation's infrastructure and replace Obamacare.; At a Senate Intelligence Committee hearing, DNI Dan Coats and NSA Director Michael S. Rogers testify that they never felt inappropriate pressure from President Trump but decline to answer questions on private conversations with him.	
Thursday, June 8	President Trump addresses the Faith and Freedom Coalition's annual conference in Washington.; James Comey testifies to the Senate Intelligence Committee in an open hearing in which he reiterates his statement that President Trump was not under investigation by the FBI during his tenure, but he does not explicitly confirm whether or not he considers the president to have obstructed any investigation. He confirms that Michael Flynn was under criminal investigation prior to his removal from the administration.	
Friday, June 9	President Trump announces in a speech at the Department of Transportation that he will set up a special council to speed up the permit process to build roads and bridges.; President Trump holds a bilateral meeting and joint press conference with Romanian President Klaus Iohannis at the White House, discussing issues such as NATO, and accusing James Comey of lying under oath on June 8.	A Joint Press Conference between President Trump and Romania President Klaus Iohannis
Saturday, June 10		
Sunday, June 11		
Monday, June 12	President Trump holds his first full cabinet meeting at the White House since his inauguration, blaming the Democrats for delaying some of his nominees.; President Trump hosts the NCAA champions Clemson Tigers at the White House.; The Attorneys General of Maryland and the District of Columbia file a lawsuit against President Trump, alleging violation of the emoluments clause.; A second federal court rejects President Trump's appeal to lift the injunction against Executive Order 13780, citing a lack of 'sufficient justification' for the travel ban.	
Tuesday, June 13	President Trump hosts a luncheon at the White House with Republican senators to discuss repealing the Affordable Care Act.; It is reported that 70% of Trump Organisation properties sold since the election have been to anonymous LLC's, while before the election the figure was 2%.; The president blocks VoteVets, a veterans group representing 50,000 veterans, on Twitter.; President Trump promotes opening technical apprenticeships to teenagers in a workforce development roundtable discussion in Milwaukee, Wisconsin.; Attorney General Sessions testifies to the Senate Intelligence Committee on matters related to alleged Russian interference in the 2016 U.S. presidential election.	
Wednesday, June 14	Special counsel Robert Mueller is conducting an investigation into whether the president obstructed justice.; President Trump and Vice President Pence send messages of support to those affected by a shooting incident in Alexandria, Virginia.; Almost 200 Congressional Democrats file against President Trump a third lawsuit alleging violation of the Foreign Emoluments Clause, the ongoing suits being D.C. and Maryland v. Trump and CREW v. Trump.; The Department of Education withdraws its finding that an Ohio school district discriminated against a transgender girl.	President Trump addresses the nation following the Congressional baseball shooting.
Thursday, June 15	President Trump and First Lady Melania Trump visit congressman Steve Scalise, who was critically wounded in the Virginia shooting incident a day earlier.; President Trump describes on Twitter alleged collusion with Russia as a "phony story" in response to reports that he has been under investigation for possible obstruction of justice following the dismissal of James Comey on May 9.; President Trump appoints Eric Trump's wedding planner to run federal housing in New York.; DNI Dan Coats meets with the Senate Intelligence Committee in closed session to address issues from his testimony of June 7.; President Trump signs an executive order promoting apprenticeships, increasing the funding for job-training programs by 5.5%, and giving more freedom to third-party companies and schools to craft these programs.; President Trump and First lady Melania Trump attend the investiture ceremony of Justice Neil Gorsuch at the Supreme Court.	Secretaries Tillerson and Kelly participate in the Senior Leaders Meeting at the Conference on Prosperity and Security in Central America in Miami.
Friday, June 16	The Trump administration partially rolls back the thawing of ties with Cuba.; The White House tries to lessen the severity of a sanctions bill on Russia.; Deputy assistant secretary for strategic operations and outreach in the Office for Civil Rights (OCR) of the U.S. Department of Education (and the office's acting sssistant secretary) Candice Jackson releases new guidelines regarding bathroom policy for transgender students.; In a Twitter post, President Trump confirms that he is under investigation for obstruction of justice, reiterating his claim that it is a 'witch hunt'.; President Trump announces a roll-back of the Obama administration's policy of easing restrictions with Cuba at a rally in Miami, Florida.; The presidential Commission on Combating Drug Addiction and the Opioid Crisis, led by New Jersey governor Chris Christie, holds its first meeting at the White House.	President Trump signs the National Security Presidential Memorandum on Strengthening the Policy of the U.S. Toward Cuba.
Saturday, June 17	President Trump sends a message of support via Twitter to the families of the USS Fitzgerald (DDG-62) crew members recently killed and injured in a collision in the Sea of Japan.; President Trump and First Lady Melania Trump makes their first visit to Camp David.; Sheriff David Clarke withdraws from his nomination for Deputy Secretary of the Department of Homeland Security.	
Sunday, June 18		
Monday, June 19	Secretary of Energy Rick Perry says he does not believe carbon dioxide to be causing climate change.; President Trump holds a bilateral meeting with Panamanian President Juan Carlos Varela at the White House, to discuss organized crime, drug trafficking and illegal migration.; President Trump issues a statement regarding the death of Otto Warmbier, a prior detainee of North Korea.; President Trump hosts the heads of major American technology companies at the White House for the first meeting of the American Technology Council.	President Trump and Panamanian President Juan Carlos Varela
Tuesday, June 20	President Trump holds a bilateral meeting with Ukrainian President Petro Poroshenko at the White House, as new sanctions against Russia are announced.; The Trump administration plans to cut EPA's budget by 31%, firing over 1,200 staff members.; President Trump declares on Twitter that China's effort to restrain the North Korean nuclear program has failed.; Energy Secretary Rick Perry warns of the domestic threat posed by America's nuclear waste.	President Trump and Ukrainian President Petro Poroshenko
Wednesday, June 21	President Trump visits Kirkwood Community College, Iowa, for demonstrations of new agricultural technology.; President Trump holds a campaign rally at Cedar Rapids, Iowa, speaking of his plan to replace the Affordable Care Act, and reiterating his criticism of the Democratic Party and of the mainstream media.; Attorney General Sessions introduces the National Public Safety Partnership initiative, pledging federal resources to help twelve cities combat crime.; Vice President Pence holds the National Summit on Crime Reduction and Public Safety at the Hyatt Regency Bethesda hotel, featuring discussions on drug abuse and violent crime.	
Thursday, June 22	Two senior intelligence officials confirm to Robert Mueller that the president had asked them both to publicly announce that he had not colluded with Russia.; President Trump hosts many emerging technology leaders at the American Leadership in Emerging Technology event at the White House to discuss modernizing government technology and upcoming drone technology.; President Trump confirms that he made no recordings of his conversations with James Comey.; President Trump meets with the president of the International Olympic Committee Thomas Bach to discuss Los Angeles's bid to host the Summer Olympics in 2024.; President Trump and First Lady Melania Trump host the first congressional picnic in the White House South Lawn, while paying tribute to congressman Scalise.	President Trump and Vice President Pence with their wives at the 2017 Congressional Picnic
Friday, June 23	President Trump nominates Woody Johnson to be the next UK ambassador.; President Trump signs the Department of Veterans Affairs Accountability and Whistleblower Protection Act, making it easier to dismiss employees for wrongdoing and adding protections for whistle-blowers.; President Trump cuts $400,000 of funding from Life After Hate, a non-profit group which helps people leave the Ku Klux Klan and other white-supremacist and Nazi organizations.; At a Focus on the Family event in Colorado Springs, Vice President Pence delivers a speech on religious freedom and the pro-life movement.	Vice President Pence and Secretary of the Air Force Heather Wilson visit the Cheyenne Mountain Air Force Station.
Saturday, June 24	Vice President Pence attends a Republican National Committee event in Chicago to promote his administration's health bill.	
Sunday, June 25		
Monday, June 26	The Supreme Court reinstates, as of June 29, President Trump's executive order temporarily banning travelers and refugees from six Muslim-majority countries (with the caveat that they have no direct ties to the U.S.), in advance of a full hearing scheduled for October 2017.; President Trump holds a bilateral meeting and joint press conference with Indian Prime Minister Narendra Modi at the White House.; The White House releases a statement warning that should Syrian president Bashar al-Assad conduct "another mass murder attack using chemical weapons, he and his military will pay a heavy price." Nikki Haley states that Russia and Iran would share any blame.	Joint Press Conference between President Trump and Indian Prime Minister Narendra Modi
Tuesday, June 27	President Trump congratulates by telephone the new Taoiseach Leo Varadkar on winning the Fine Gael leadership contest.; The EPA rolls back regulations on drinking water purity.; Senator Mitch McConnell postpones a vote on Trump's initiative to repeal and replace the Affordable Care Act.; President Trump meets with GOP senators at the White House concerning the pending health care bill.	President Trump and Ivanka Trump meet with Chibok schoolgirls at the White House.
Wednesday, June 28	President Trump meets with the families of victims of illegal immigrants and calls on Congress to enact new law-enforcement legislation.; President Trump meets with state governors and tribal and local leaders at the White House to discuss American energy independence.; Vice President Pence delivers a speech at Tendon Manufacturing in Bedford, Ohio, concerning tax cuts and employment, and stating that the Affordable Care Act will be repealed by the end of summer 2017.; National Security Advisor McMaster confirms that he is preparing a military option for Trump in respect of North Korea.; UN Ambassador Haley testifies to the House Committee on Foreign Affairs, confirming that she has not discussed with President Trump Russia's alleged interference in the 2016 election.; President Trump holds a 2020 election campaign fundraising event at Trump International Hotel, Washington, D.C.; President Trump hosts the 2016 World Series Champions Chicago Cubs at the Oval Office.	President Trump with the Chicago Cubs at the White House
Thursday, June 29	The president tweets about Mika Brzezinski, saying she had been “bleeding badly from a face-lift.”; In a speech at the Energy Department, President Trump calls for a review of American nuclear energy policy and for increased energy exports.; President Trump hosts South Korean President Moon Jae-in at the White House.; President Trump's partial travel ban comes into effect at 8:00 p.m. EDT.	President Trump delivers remarks at the Energy Department headquarters.
Friday, June 30	Joe Scarborough and Mika Brzezinski claim that the White House had blackmailed with an article about their relationship in the National Enquirer, demanding they change their news coverage of him.; President Trump holds a bilateral meeting and joint press conference with South Korean president Moon Jae-in at the White House to discuss trade and the North Korean threat in a second day of summit talks.; Vice President Pence and South Korean president Moon Jae-in attend a wreath-laying ceremony at the Korean War Veterans Memorial.; President Trump speaks by telephone with Turkish president Recep Tayyip Erdogan to discuss issues such as America's support of the YPG in Syria and the extradition of Fethullah Gülen who is accused of masterminding the 2016 Turkish coup.; President Trump reiterates a prior suggestion to repeal the Affordable Care Act immediately, and replace it later.; President Trump signs an executive order reviving the National Space Council.	President Trump and South Korean President Moon Jae-in

== See also ==
- First 100 days of the first Trump presidency – Period from January to April 2017
- List of executive actions by Donald Trump
- Lists of presidential trips made by Donald Trump (international trips)
- First presidential transition of Donald Trump – Transfer of presidential power from Barack Obama to Donald Trump
- Timeline of the 2016 United States presidential election

U.S. presidential administration timelines
Preceded by First Trump presidency (2017 Q1)	First Trump presidency (2017 Q2)	Succeeded by First Trump presidency (2017 Q3)
