= 2019 Salvadoran presidential election =

- 3 February 2019
- Opinion polls
- Registered: 5,268,411
- Turnout: 51.88% (▼3.44pp)
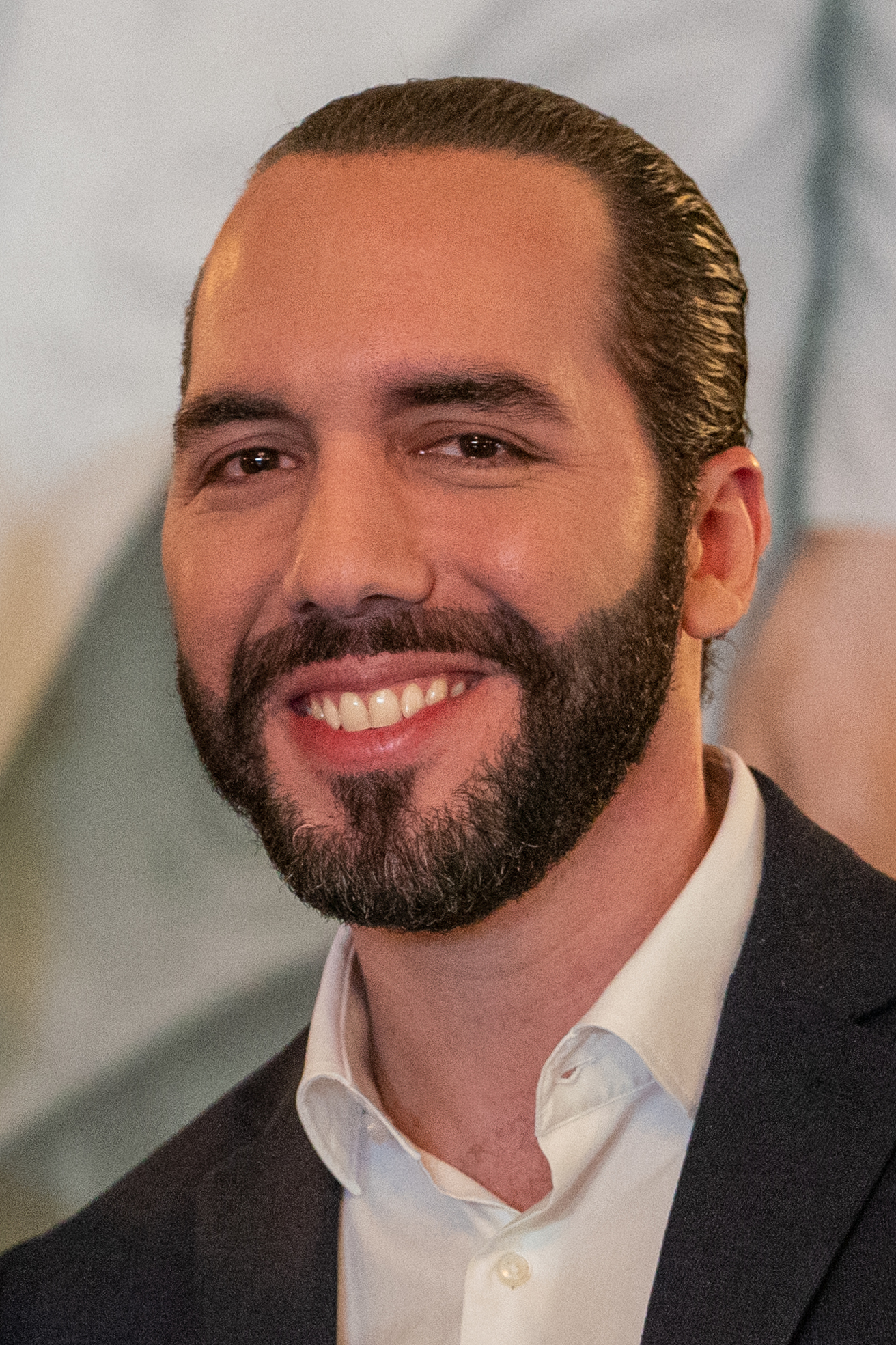

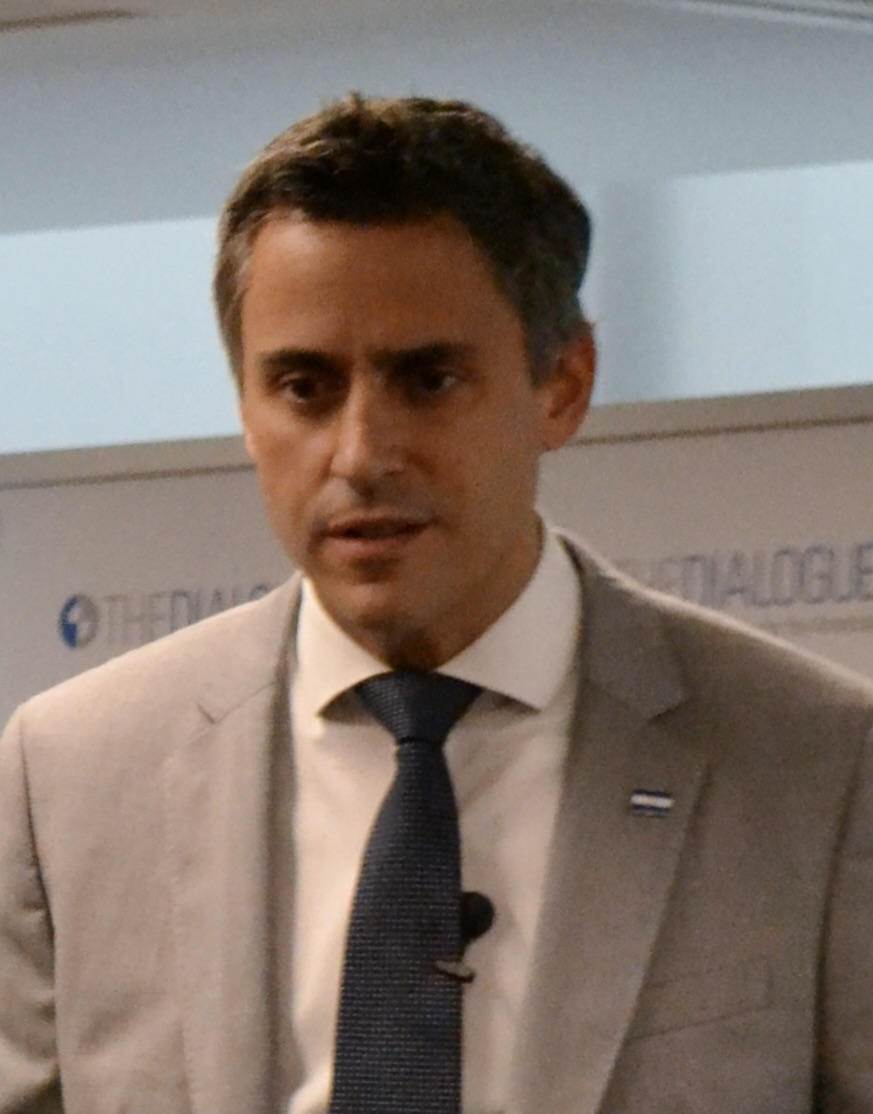

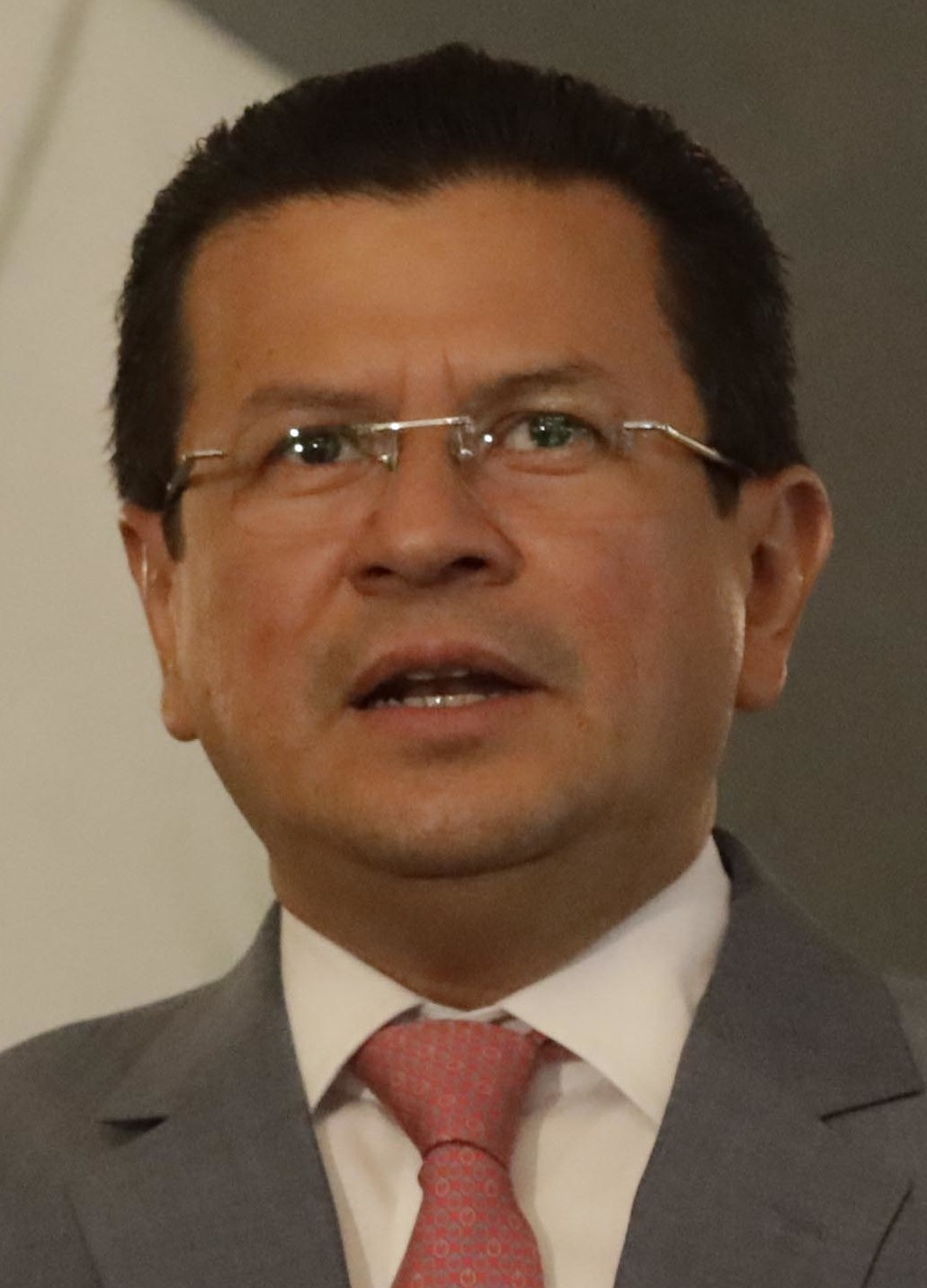
| Nominee | Nayib Bukele | Carlos Calleja | Hugo Martínez |
| Party | GANA | ARENA | FMLN |
| Running mate | Félix Ulloa | Carmen Lazo | Karina Sosa |
| Popular vote | 1,434,856 | 857,084 | 389,289 |
| Percentage | 53.10% | 31.72% | 14.41% |
- Results by department
President before election
Salvador Sánchez Cerén
FMLN
Elected President
Nayib Bukele
GANA

Presidential elections were held in El Salvador on 3 February 2019, with Salvadorans electing the president and vice president for a five-year term from 2019 to 2024.

The election resulted in victory for Nayib Bukele of the right-wing Grand Alliance for National Unity (GANA), who received 53%, defeating Carlos Calleja of the right-wing Nationalist Republican Alliance (ARENA), Hugo Martínez of the left-wing Farabundo Martí National Liberation Front (FMLN) and Josué Alvarado of the centrist Vamos party. With his victory, Bukele became the first president since José Napoleón Duarte (1984–1989) to not be a member of either ARENA or the FMLN, which had controlled the presidency in a two-party system from 1989 to 2019.

Prior to the elections, Bukele held a lead against Calleja, Martínez and Alvarado in virtually every poll conducted between July 2018 and January 2019. A second round in March was rendered unnecessary as Bukele won an outright majority; Bukele won a plurality in all of the country's fourteen departments, winning an outright majority in eight of them. Bukele was inaugurated on 1 June 2019.

== Background ==
=== Presidency of Salvador Sánchez Cerén ===
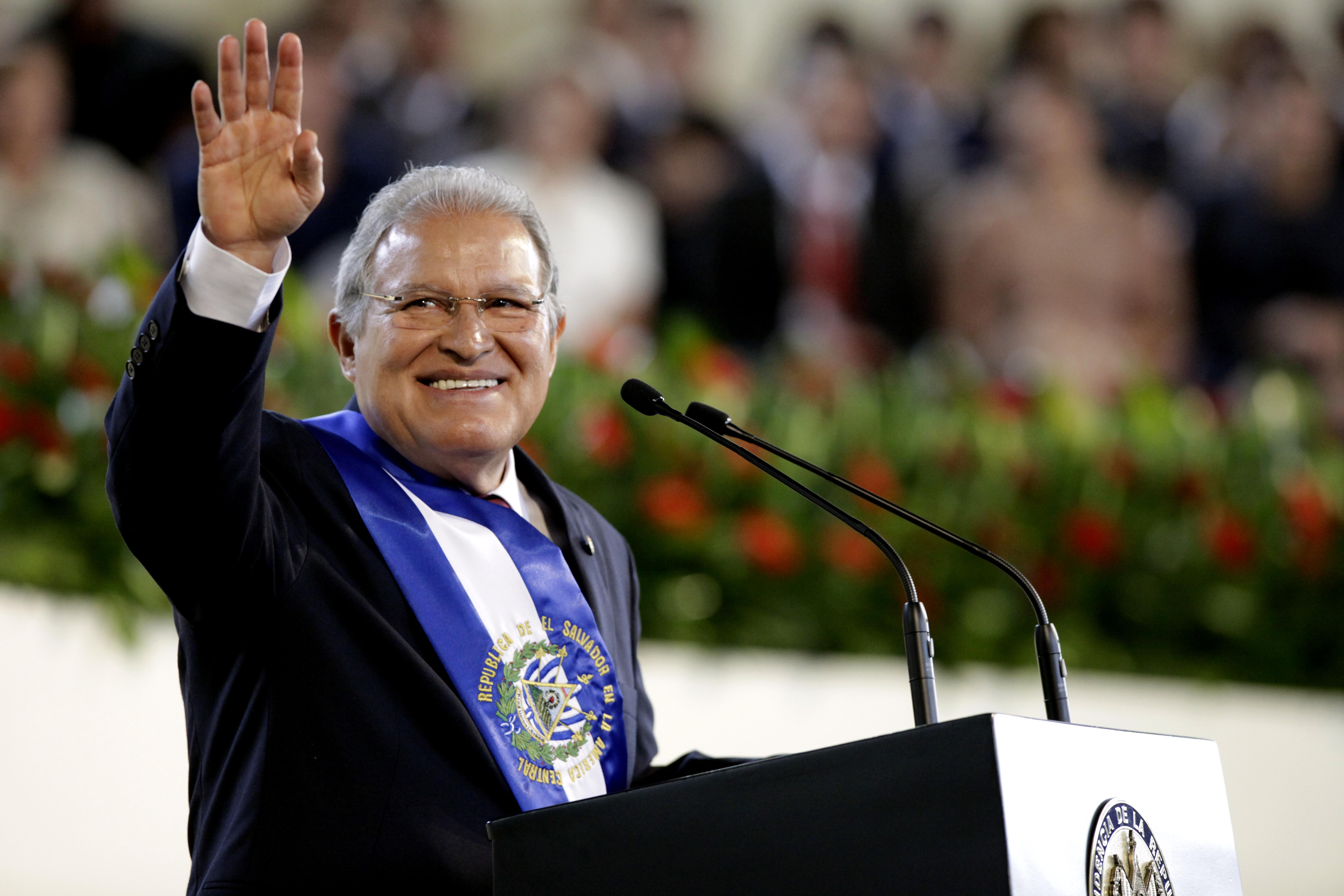
Salvador Sánchez Cerén at his inauguration in 2014.

Salvador Sánchez Cerén, the then vice president of El Salvador, won the 2014 presidential election by a narrow margin. As a member of the left-wing Farabundo Martí National Liberation Front (FMLN), he defeated Norman Quijano, the then mayor of San Salvador of the right-wing Nationalist Republican Alliance, in that election's second round, winning 50.11 percent of the vote by a margin of 6,364 votes. Sánchez Cerén was inaugurated on 1 June 2014, succeeding fellow FMLN President Mauricio Funes. He was the first former guerrilla fighter from the Salvadoran Civil War to be elected president.

Although in control of the presidency, the FMLN did not have a majority of the Legislative Assembly, with power being divided between it, ARENA, and various other political parties. In the 2015 legislative election, the FMLN won 31 seats and ARENA won 35 seats, with the remaining 18 seats being controlled by other parties. In the succeeding 2018 legislative election, the FMLN fell to 23 seats while ARENA increased to 38 seats, with the remaining 23 seats being controlled by other parties.

== Electoral system ==
=== Electoral procedure ===
In October 2017, the Supreme Electoral Court (TSE) scheduled El Salvador's upcoming 2019 presidential election to occur on 3 February 2019, with a possible second round being scheduled for 10 March 2019. In the election, Salvadorans would elect the country's president and vice president to serve a five-year term from 2019 to 2024.

A presidential candidate needed to win an absolute majority (50% + 1) to be declared the winner of the election. If no candidate received an absolute majority, a second between the two candidates with the most valid votes would have occurred. All presidential and vice presidential candidates must have been at least 30 years old and be Salvadoran citizens by birth.

=== Political parties ===
| Party | | Leader | Participated? |
|---|---|---|---|
| PDC | Christian Democratic Party; Partido Demócrata Cristiano | Rodolfo Parker | No (Note: Endorsed the Nationalist Republican Alliance's candidates.) |
| CD | Democratic Change; Cambio Democrático | Douglas Avilés | No |
| FMLN | Farabundo Martí National Liberation Front; Frente Farabundo Martí para la Liberación Nacional | Medardo González | Yes |
| GANA | Grand Alliance for National Unity; Gran Alianza por la Unidad Nacional | Andrés Rovira | Yes |
| V | Let's Go; Vamos | Josué Alvarado | Yes |
| PCN | National Coalition Party; Partido de Concertación Nacional | Manuel Rodríguez | No |
| ARENA | Nationalist Republican Alliance; Alianza Republicana Nacionalista | Mauricio Interiano | Yes |
| DS | Salvadoran Democracy; Democracia Salvadoreña | | No |
| FPS | Salvadoran Patriotic Fraternity; Fraternidad Patriota Salvadoreña | | No |
| PSP | Salvadoran Progressive Party; Partido Salvadoreño Progresista | | No |
| FPS | Social Democrat Party; Partido Social Demócrata | | No |

=== Electoral dates ===
The following tables lists dates which mark events which related to the election.

| Date | Event |
|---|---|
| 2 February 2018 | Deadline for voters to change address |
| 4 April 2018 | Deadline for parties to convoke primary elections |
| 2 October 2018 | Beginning of electoral campaigning |
| 5 October 2018 | Deadline for the TSE to convoke the presidential election |
| 3 February 2019 | Presidential election |
| 10 March 2019 | Second round (if necessary) |

== Electoral campaigns ==
=== Nationalist Republican Alliance ===
On 27 October 2017, Mauricio Interiano, the president of the Nationalist Republican Alliance, announced that the party would hold its primary election on 22 April 2018. Six members of the party expressed interest in securing the party's presidential nomination:

- Gerardo Awad, businessman
- Carlos Calleja, businessman
- Gustavo López, businessman
- Rafael Montalvo, former deputy of the Legislative Assembly
- Luis Parada, lawyer
- Javier Simán, businessman

In October 2017, Parada withdrew his candidacy, believing that his campaign would be impossible. In December 2017, Awad and Montalvo were eliminated from competition, while Calleja, Simán, and López advanced to the party's primary election where Calleja won 60.8 percent of the vote, officially becoming the party's presidential nominee.

2018 ARENA presidential primary election
| Candidate | Votes | % |
|---|---|---|
| Carlos Calleja | 34,670 | 60.80 |
| Javier Simán | 21,779 | 38.19 |
| Gustavo López | 574 | 1.01 |
| Total | 57,023 | 100.00 |
| Valid votes | 57,023 | 96.86 |
| Invalid votes | 1,292 | 2.19 |
| Blank votes | 559 | 0.95 |
| Total votes | 58,874 | 100.00 |
Source: Nationalist Republican Alliance

=== Farabundo Martí National Liberation Front ===
On 28 February 2018, the Farabundo Martí National Liberation Front announced that it would hold its primary election on 27 May 2018. Óscar Ortiz, the then vice president of El Salvador, was a potential candidate to secure the party's nomination, but he declined to run after Salvador Cerén appointed him as the technical secretary of the presidency. Two party members announced their intention to seek the party's presidential nomination:

- Gerson Martínez, former deputy of the Legislative Assembly
- Hugo Martínez, minister of foreign affairs (2014–2018)

On 27 May 2018, Hugo Martínez was selected as the party's presidential nominee, winning 72.09 percent of the vote. The party elected Karina Sosa, a former deputy of the Legislative Assembly, as the party's vice presidential nominee.

2018 FMLN presidential primary election
| Candidate | Votes | % |
|---|---|---|
| Hugo Martínez | 20,259 | 72.09 |
| Gerson Martínez | 7,845 | 27.91 |
| Total | 28,104 | 100.00 |
| Valid votes | 28,104 | 99.47 |
| Invalid/blank votes | 150 | 0.53 |
| Total votes | 28,254 | 100.00 |
Source: El Mundo

=== Grand Alliance for National Unity ===
The Grand Alliance for National Unity held its primary election on 29 July 2018. Two candidates participated in the election, Nayib Bukele, the former mayor of San Salvador from 2015 to 2018, and Will Salgado, the former mayor of San Miguel, but the day before the election, Salgado announced that he withdrew from the primary. Although Salgado withdrew, his name was still on the ballot, but regardless, Bukele won 93.71 percent of the vote and was selected as the party's presidential nominee. Bukele's campaign slogan was "Let's Make History" ("Hagamos Historia").

2018 GANA presidential primary election
| Candidate | Votes | % |
|---|---|---|
| Nayib Bukele | 1,863 | 93.71 |
| Will Salgado (withdrawn) | 125 | 6.29 |
| Total | 1,988 | 100.00 |
| Valid votes | 1,988 | 96.41 |
| Invalid votes | 65 | 3.15 |
| Blank votes | 9 | 0.44 |
| Total votes | 2,062 | 100.00 |
Source: El Mundo

== Presidential candidates ==
| Party | Candidate | | Running mate | |
|---|---|---|---|---|
| Grand Alliance for National Unity Grand Alliance for National Unity (Note: Bukele's electoral campaign with the Grand Alliance for National Unity was supported by Nuevas Ideas.) | Nayib Bukele | Nayib Bukele; Mayor of San Salvador (2015–2018); Mayor of Nuevo Cuscatlán (2012–2015) | Félix Ulloa | Félix Ulloa |
| Nationalist Republican Alliance Nationalist; Republican; Alliance (Note: Calleja's campaign with the Nationalist Republican Alliance was supported by the National Coalition Party (PCN), Christian Democratic Party (PDC), and Salvadoran Democracy (DS).) | Carlos Calleja | Carlos Calleja | Carmen Lazo | Carmen Lazo |
| Farabundo Martí National Liberation Front Farabundo Martí; National Liberation; Front | Hugo Martínez | Hugo Martínez; Minister of Foreign Affairs (2009–2013, 2014–2018); Secretary General of SICA (2013–2014); Deputy of the Legislative Assembly (2003–2009) | Karina Sosa | Karina Sosa; Deputy of the Legislative Assembly (2012–2021) |
| Vamos Vamos | Josué Alvarado | Josué Alvarado | Roberto Rivera | Roberto Rivera |

== Debates ==
Two presidential debates were held; the first was hosted by the University of El Salvador (UES) on 16 December 2018 and the second was hosted by the Salvadoran Association of Broadcasters (ASDER). Calleja, Martínez, and Alvarado attended both debates, while Bukele was absent from both.

2019 Salvadoran presidential election debates
| Date | Organizers | P Present A Absent | | | | |
| Date | Organizers | ARENA | FMLN | VAMOS | GANA | Ref. |
|---|---|---|---|---|---|---|
| 16 Dec 2018 | UES | P Calleja | P Martínez | P Alvarado | A Bukele | |
| 13 Jan 2019 | ASDER | P Calleja | P Martínez | P Alvarado | A Bukele | |

== Opinion polls ==
Opinion polling from July 2018 through January 2019 consistently gave Bukele a lead over Calleja, Martínez, and Alvarado.

Local regression of polls conducted

Presidential election polls
| Polling firm | Fieldwork date | Sample size | Calleja (ARENA) | Martínez (FMLN) | Alvarado (VAMOS) | Bukele (GANA) | Undecided | None | Lead | Ref. |
|---|---|---|---|---|---|---|---|---|---|---|
| CONARES | 17 Jan 2019 | 2,012 | 19.0 | 13.0 | 1.0 | 61.0 | 3.0 | 3.0 | 42.0 | |
| CDOP | 17 Jan 2019 | 1,300 | 27.3 | 10.5 | 1.0 | 36.1 | 9.6 | 15.1 | 8.8 | |
| CIOPS/UTEC | 16 Jan 2019 | 2,113 | 24.0 | 8.1 | 0.6 | 40.4 | 26.1 | – | 16.4 | |
| UFG | 15 Jan 2019 | 1,536 | 21.8 | 8.1 | 1.0 | 42.6 | 18.4 | 8.1 | 20.8 | |
| CIG-Gallup | 11 Jan 2019 | 1,000 | 23.0 | 8.0 | 1.0 | 42.0 | 26.0 | – | 19.0 | |
| Mitofsky | 8 Jan 2019 | 1,000 | 31.0 | 11.0 | 1.0 | 57.0 | – | – | 26.0 | |
| IUDOP/UCA | 13 Dec 2018 | 1,806 | 19.7 | 10.6 | 0.8 | 44.1 | 22.3 | 2.5 | 24.4 | |
| TResearch | 11 Dec 2018 | 1,000 | 31.0 | 10.3 | 1.3 | 57.4 | – | – | 26.4 | |
| UES | 10 Dec 2018 | 1,557 | 17.34 | 8.73 | 0.26 | 48.43 | 25.24 | – | 31.09 | |
| Fundaungo | 7 Dec 2018 | 1,985 | 21.4 | 11.3 | 0.6 | 42.0 | 15.0 | 9.7 | 20.6 | |
| TResearch | 5 Dec 2018 | 1,000 | 31.3 | 10.4 | 1.3 | 57.0 | – | – | 25.7 | |
| CIOPS/UTEC | 5 Dec 2018 | 2,133 | 24.5 | 10.4 | 0.9 | 40.5 | 12.8 | 10.9 | 16.0 | |
| La Prensa Gráfica | 29 Nov 2018 | 2,000 | 16.8 | 6.9 | 0.5 | 28.9 | 5.7 | 41.2 | 12.1 | |
| TResearch | 25 Nov 2018 | 1,000 | 31.9 | 10.8 | 1.4 | 55.9 | – | – | 24.0 | |
| Fundaungo | 20 Nov 2018 | 1,068 | 14.2 | 10.2 | 1.9 | 35.1 | 10.0 | 28.6 | 20.9 | |
| UFG | 19 Nov 2018 | 1,538 | 21.4 | 6.4 | 1.5 | 40.7 | 21.2 | 8.7 | 19.3 | |
| CID-Gallup | 1 Nov 2018 | 1,000 | 28.0 | 16.0 | 1.0 | 44.0 | – | 1.0 | 16.0 | |
| TResearch | 29 Oct 2018 | 1,000 | 32.2 | 9.0 | 0.9 | 56.6 | – | 1.3 | 24.4 | |
| TResearch | 24 Oct 2018 | 1,000 | 32.1 | 9.3 | 1.1 | 56.5 | – | 1.0 | 24.4 | |
| ICP | 23 Oct 2018 | 1,400 | 31.7 | 13.6 | 0.6 | 33.3 | – | 20.8 | 1.6 | |
| TResearch | 15 Oct 2018 | 1,000 | 31.8 | 9.4 | 1.0 | 56.1 | – | 1.7 | 24.3 | |
| CIOPS/UTEC | 9 Oct 2018 | 2,133 | 21.0 | 10.5 | 1.0 | 48.0 | 19.5 | – | 27.0 | |
| CONARES | 8 Oct 2018 | 1,400 | 21.0 | 11.0 | 1.0 | 45.0 | 11.0 | 11.0 | 24.0 | |
| TResearch | 1 Oct 2018 | 1,000 | 32.4 | 10.9 | 1.1 | 54.6 | – | 1.0 | 22.2 | |
| CID-Gallup | 26 Sept 2018 | 1,205 | 20.0 | 7.0 | 1.0 | 45.0 | 27.0 | – | 25.0 | |
| La Prensa Gráfica | 31 Aug 2018 | 1,520 | 17.6 | 8.6 | 0.3 | 21.9 | 37.5 | 14.1 | 4.3 | |
| UFG | 28 Aug 2018 | 1,295 | 23.0 | 10.0 | 2.3 | 37.7 | 26.0 | 1.0 | 14.7 | |
| TResearch | 19 Aug 2018 | 3,600 | 30.2 | 9.7 | 1.1 | 55.9 | – | 3.1 | 25.7 | |
| TResearch | 31 Jul 2018 | 3,600 | 31.7 | 9.7 | 2.8 | 55.8 | – | – | 24.1 | |
| CID-Gallup | 30 Jul 2018 | 806 | 24.0 | 5.0 | 0.0 | 38.0 | 33.0 | – | 14.0 | |
| 2014 election | 9 Mar 2014 | N/A | 49.89 | 50.11 | – | – | – | – | 0.22 | |

== Results ==
| Candidate | Running mate | Party | Votes | % |
|---|---|---|---|---|
| Nayib Bukele | Félix Ulloa | Grand Alliance for National Unity | 1,434,856 | 53.10 |
| Carlos Calleja | Carmen Aída Lazo | Nationalist Republican Alliance | 857,084 | 31.72 |
| Hugo Martínez | Karina Sosa | Farabundo Martí National Liberation Front | 389,289 | 14.41 |
| Josué Alvarado | Roberto Rivera | Vamos | 20,763 | 0.77 |
| Total | | | 2,701,992 | 100.00 |
| Valid votes | | | 2,701,992 | 98.86 |
| Invalid/blank votes | | | 31,186 | 1.14 |
| Total votes | | | 2,733,178 | 100.00 |
| Registered voters/turnout | | | 5,268,411 | 51.88 |
Source: TSE

=== Results by department ===
The following table displays the number of votes each candidate received from each of the country's 14 departments as well as from the exterior vote. The candidate with the most votes in a department is highlighted in their party's color and the runner-up in a department is in gray.

| Department | Calleja | | Martínez | | Alvarado | | Bukele | |
| Department | Votes | % | Votes | % | Votes | % | Votes | % |
|---|---|---|---|---|---|---|---|---|
| Ahuachapán | 50,051 | 36.10 | 28,257 | 20.38 | 660 | 0.47 | 59,689 | 43.05 |
| Cabañas | 26,325 | 39.61 | 8,586 | 12.92 | 199 | 0.30 | 31,346 | 47.17 |
| Chalatenango | 30,364 | 32.40 | 20,934 | 22.34 | 316 | 0.34 | 42,092 | 44.92 |
| Cuscatlán | 39,098 | 33.89 | 17,882 | 15.50 | 609 | 0.52 | 57,795 | 50.09 |
| La Libertad | 117,092 | 37.25 | 33,823 | 9.85 | 3,756 | 1.10 | 177,832 | 51.80 |
| La Paz | 40,762 | 29.41 | 17,357 | 12.53 | 656 | 0.47 | 79,803 | 57.59 |
| La Unión | 29,138 | 31.82 | 12,256 | 13.39 | 295 | 0.32 | 49,871 | 54.47 |
| Morazán | 26,007 | 32.13 | 23,102 | 28.54 | 193 | 0.23 | 31,649 | 39.10 |
| San Miguel | 43,960 | 24.36 | 37,529 | 20.80 | 906 | 0.50 | 98,064 | 54.34 |
| San Salvador | 246,792 | 29.99 | 86,656 | 10.53 | 9,582 | 1.16 | 479,991 | 58.32 |
| Santa Ana | 77,550 | 34.09 | 24,695 | 10.86 | 1,821 | 0.80 | 123,413 | 54.25 |
| San Vicente | 22,786 | 31.33 | 15,921 | 21.89 | 266 | 0.36 | 33,765 | 46.42 |
| Sonsonate | 60,796 | 31.62 | 28,599 | 14.87 | 1,095 | 0.57 | 101,794 | 52.94 |
| Usulután | 35,422 | 26.47 | 33,350 | 24.93 | 406 | 0.30 | 64,619 | 48.30 |
| Exterior vote | 165 | 4.52 | 342 | 9.39 | 3 | 0.09 | 3,133 | 86.00 |
| Total | 857,084 | 31.72 | 389,289 | 14.41 | 20,763 | 0.77 | 1,434,856 | 53.10 |
Source: TSE

== See also ==
- Elections in El Salvador
- List of elections in 2019
- 2019 national electoral calendar
