= Carmen Aída Lazo =

Salvadoran economist and politician (b. 1976)

- Born: January 3, 1976 (age 50); San Salvador
- Education: Master of Public Administration (M.P.A.)
- Alma mater: Harvard University
- Occupation: Economist
- Employer: Escuela Superior de Economia y Negocios (ESEN)
- Title: Dean
- Spouse: Ivan Sanjines

Carmen Aída Lazo (San Salvador, January 3, 1976) is a Salvadoran economist and dean of the School of Economics and Business at Escuela Superior de Economía y Negocios. She was a candidate for vice president of El Salvador for the National Coalition Party (PCN) for the 2019 presidential election.

== Early life and education ==
In 1994, Lazo began studying economics at Escuela Superior de Economía y Negocios. She graduated with honors in 1999, and subsequently earned a master's degree in applied macroeconomics from the Catholic University of Chile and a master's degree in public administration from Harvard University. While attending Harvard, she received scholarships from the governments of Japan, the United States and from the World Bank.

== Career ==
She worked as a Program Officer and as Deputy Coordinator of the Human Development Report in the United Nations Development Program (UNDP). She also worked in the Ministry of Economy as an Advisor on issues such as energy, international trade, free zones, statistics and negotiations with different sectors. At the same time, she was part of the first Board of Directors of the Superintendence of Competition and assumed the role of President of the Board of Directors of the organization Un Techo para mi País. She was part of the team of the Partnership for Growth, as well as in the formulation and negotiation of Fomilenio II.

=== Politics ===
In 2018, she was elected as the representative of the National Concertation Party (PCN) to be registered in the presidential election of El Salvador in 2019. She is currently a candidate for the Vice Presidency of El Salvador for the PCN together with Carlos Calleja from ARENA.

== Personal life ==
She is married to Ivan Sanjines and mother of 2 children, Andres and Camila.
