= Gustavo López Davidson =

Salvadoran politician and businessman (1961–2022)

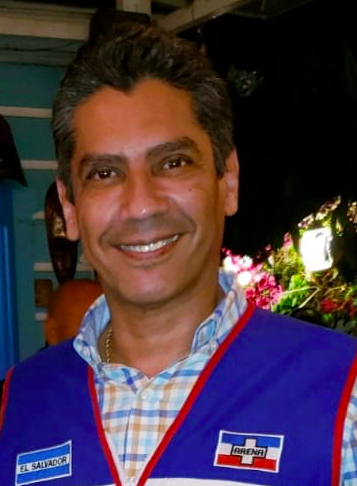
- López Davidson in c. 2019

Leader of the Nationalist Republican Alliance
- In office 25 August 2019 – 17 February 2020
- Preceded by: Mauricio Interiano (es)
- Succeeded by: Érick Salguero

Personal details
- Born: Gustavo Adolfo López Davidson; 1961 El Salvador
- Died: 21 July 2022 (aged 60–61) San Salvador, El Salvador
- Cause of death: Suicide (gunshot wound)
- Party: Nationalist Republican Alliance
- Occupation: Politician, businessman

Gustavo Adolfo López Davidson (1961 – 21 July 2022) was a Salvadoran politician and businessman who served as the leader of the Nationalist Republican Alliance (ARENA) from August 2019 to February 2020.

== Biography ==
Gustavo Adolfo López Davidson was born in 1961.

López Davidson was the manager of Alquileres S.A. de C.V. (previously known as Centrum S.A. de C.V.) and the owner of Gun Mart, two companies which imports firearms into El Salvador. As a member of the right-wing Nationalist Republican Alliance (ARENA), he ran for mayor of Soyapango in 2003. López Davidson sought to run as ARENA's candidate for president of El Salvador in the 2019 presidential election, but Carlos Calleja was ultimately selected as ARENA's candidate instead.

From 25 August 2019 to 17 February 2020, López Davidson served as the leader of the Nationalist Executive Committee (COENA), the leading authority of the Nationalist Republican Alliance. He first became a member of the committee in 2003. He resigned amidst allegations of his involvement in arms trafficking. In December 2019, the Nationalist Republican Alliance attempted to repeal the immunity of then Salvadoran President Nayib Bukele so that López Davidson could sue Bukele for defamation, as Bukele had publicly called López Davidson a "crook".

On 9 August 2020, López Davidson was arrested by the National Civil Police (PNC) on charges of embezzlement, accused of having collected USD$2 million on old guns which he sold as "new" through Centrum S.A. de C.V.

López Davidson committed suicide by a self-inflicted gunshot wound at his business in San Salvador on 21 July 2022.

Party political offices
| Preceded by Mauricio Interiano | Leader of ARENA; 2019–2020 | Succeeded by Érick Salguero |
