= Supermercados Super Selectos =

Salvadoran supermarket chain

- Industry: Supermarkets
- Founded: 1940; 86 years ago
- Founder: Daniel Calleja
- Number of locations: 111 (2023)
- Area served: El Salvador
- Website: superselectos.com

Supermercados Super Selectos is a Salvadoran supermarket chain that is owned by Grupo Calleja and founded by Daniel Calleja (whose grandson, Carlos, is the current vice-president of Grupo Calleja). The company includes Supermercados De Todo and Selectos Market. As of 2023, Supermercados Super Selectos operates 111 stores in all 14 departments.

== History ==
In 1940, Daniel Calleja founded Super Selectos, which was the first supermarket in El Salvador.

== See also ==
- Carlos Calleja
