= Marisol Argueta de Barillas =

Salvadoran politician

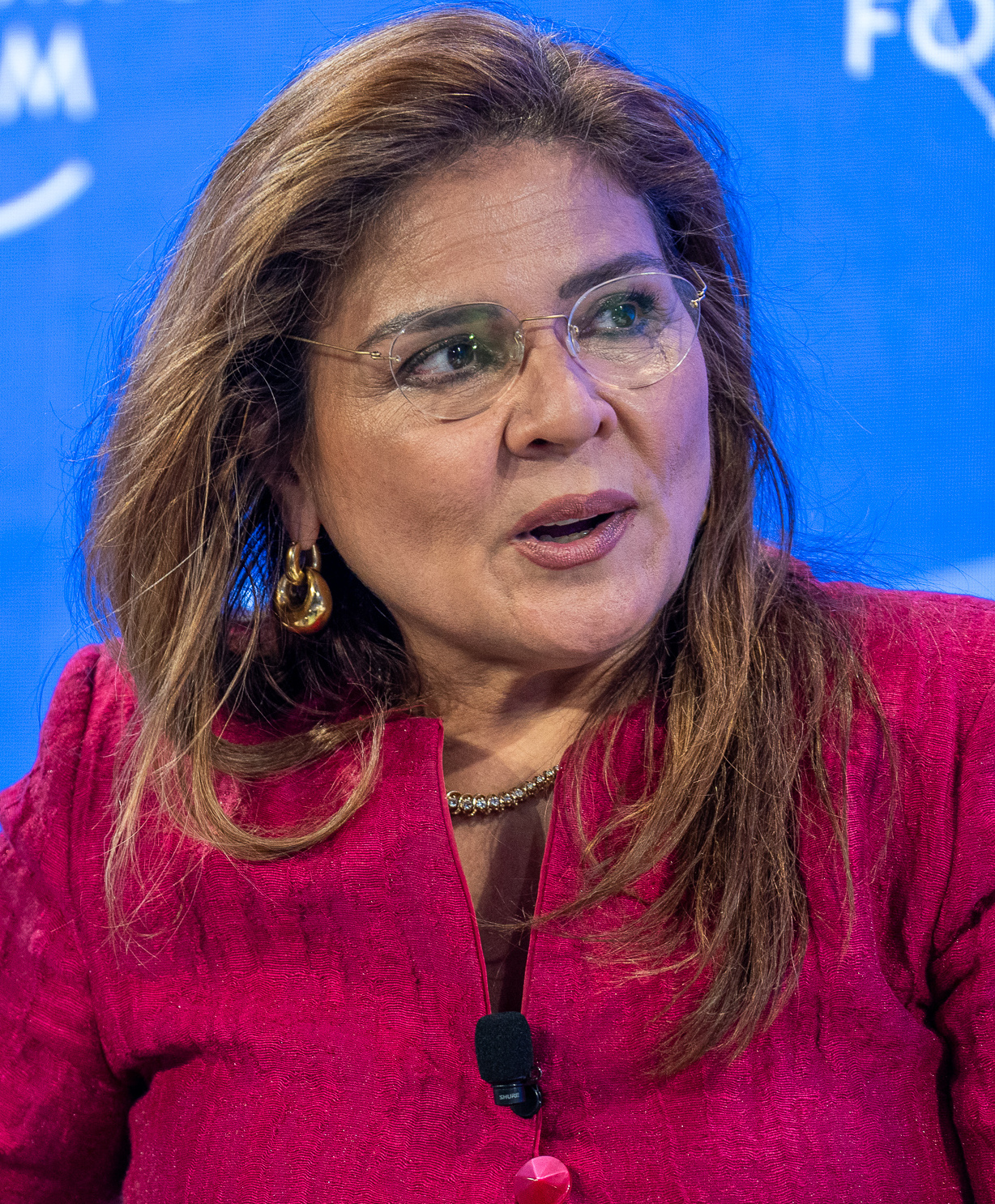
- Argueta de Barillas in 2023

Minister of Foreign Affairs
- In office 16 January 2008 – 1 June 2009
- President: Elías Antonio Saca
- Preceded by: Francisco Laínez
- Succeeded by: Hugo Martínez

Personal details
- Born: 6 April 1968 (age 57)

Marisol Argueta de Barillas is a Salvadoran politician, senior director, head of Latin America, at the World Economic Forum. She was previously the foreign minister of El Salvador, appointed in January 2008 following the resignation of Francisco Laínez, until the change of government in June 2009.

Born on 6 April 1968, and a lawyer by training, Argueta de Barillas graduated from the Academia Británica Cuscatleca, holds a JD from Universidad Dr Jose M. Delgado and a post-graduate degree in diplomacy from the University of Oxford. She also studied at the International Peace Academy, Harvard University and New York University. In addition, she has been an assistant professor of constitutional law and political law at a private university in El Salvador and has written on international affairs and regional integration.

She is a Young Global Leader of the World Economic Forum and has received national decorations from various countries and many awards, including “Best Professional 2008” from Jose M. Delgado University of El Salvador. A Member of the Aspen Institute's Central American Leadership Initiative, she is co-founder of Vital Voices – El Salvador chapter, and served on the Boards of FUSATE and Hogares CREA, El Salvador. Prior to becoming foreign minister in 2008, she served as a senior adviser to her predecessor and Director-General of Foreign Policy at the Ministry of Foreign Affairs. She has also held posts as Minister Counselor at the Embassy of El Salvador in Washington, D.C., and as Deputy Permanent Representative of El Salvador to the United Nations in New York City.
