= Karina Sosa =

Salvadoran politician

Deputy of the Central American Parliament from El Salvador
- Incumbent
- Assumed office 28 October 2021

Deputy of the Legislative Assembly of El Salvador from San Salvador
- In office 1 May 2012 – 1 May 2021

Personal details
- Born: Karina Ivette Sosa de Rodas; 5 April 1976 (age 50) San Salvador, El Salvador
- Party: Farabundo Martí National Liberation Front
- Education: University of El Salvador
- Occupation: Politician

Karina Ivette Sosa de Rodas (born 5 April 1976) is a Salvadoran politician and member of the Farabundo Martí National Liberation Front (FMLN). She was a member of the national Legislative Assembly of El Salvador from 2012 to 2021, and is currently a deputy in the Central American Parliament.

In May 2018, Sosa ran unopposed for the FMLN's vice-presidential nomination in the forthcoming 2019 presidential election. She won her party's nomination with 21,197 votes, thereby becoming the running mate of FMLN presidential candidate, Hugo Martínez.
