= Office of Population Affairs =

Office in the US Department of Health and Human Services

Agency overview
- Parent department: United States Department of Health and Human Services (Office of the Assistant Secretary for Health)
- Website: opa.hhs.gov

The Office of Population Affairs (OPA) is part of the Office of the Assistant Secretary for Health in the United States Department of Health and Human Services (HHS). It is responsible for reproductive health topics, including adolescent pregnancy, family planning, and sterilization, as well as other population issues.

Created by an Act of Congress in 1970, the Office of Population Affairs, under the direction of the Deputy Assistant Secretary of Population Affairs (DASPA), has three component offices responsible for the oversight of program functions: Office of Family Planning, Office of Adolescent Pregnancy Programs, and Office of Research and Evaluation.

== Office of Family Planning ==
The Office of Family Planning oversees the Title X Family Planning Program, enacted in 1970 as Title X of the Public Health Service Act. It is the only federal grant program dedicated solely to providing individuals with comprehensive family planning and related preventive health services. The Title X program is designed to provide access to contraceptive services, supplies and information to all who want and need them. By law, priority is given to persons from low-income families.

== Office of Research and Evaluation ==
The Office of Research and Evaluation (ORE) oversees research and evaluation activities supported by the Title X Family Planning program and the Title XX Adolescent Family Life program. Each program has legislative authority to conduct research; program implementation and related research in the case of Title X and research on the causes and consequences of adolescent premarital sexual relations and pregnancy in the case of Title XX. The Title XX statute also requires an independent evaluation of all funded demonstration projects and these evaluations are overseen by ORE staff, as are other research and evaluation activities undertaken by OPA in collaboration with other federal agencies.

== Leadership ==
The OPA is led by a deputy assistant secretary of population affairs (DASPA). It has been led by the following people:

- Teresa Manning (May 2017 to January 12, 2018)
- Valerie Huber (acting, since January 12, 2018)
