= Javier Simán =

Salvadoran businessman

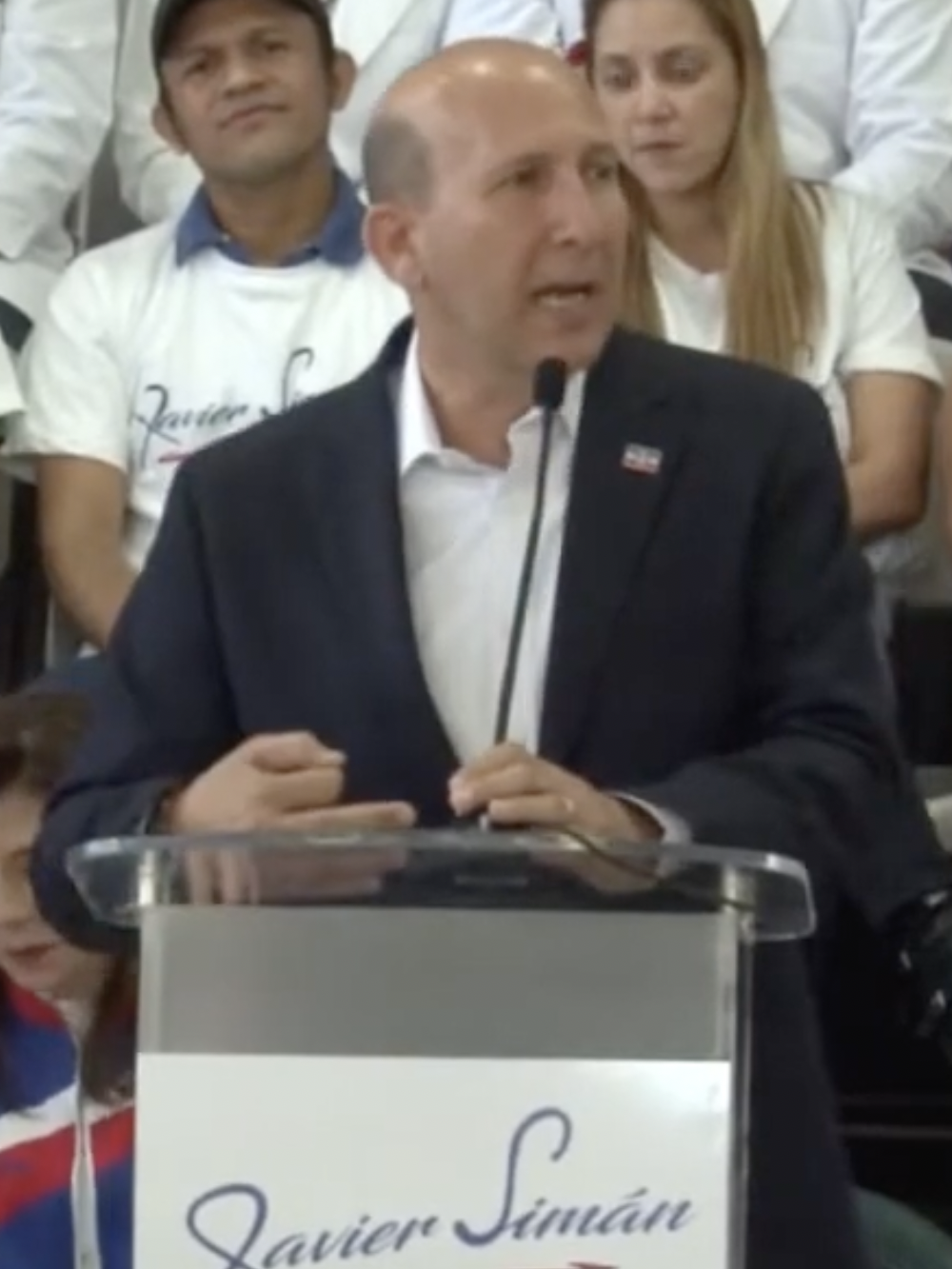
- Simán in 2018
- Born: Javier Ernesto Simán Dada; 14 June 1964 (age 62); El Salvador
- Occupations: Businessman, lawyer
- Political party: Nationalist Republican Alliance

Javier Ernesto Simán Dada (born 14 June 1964) is a Salvadoran businessman, lawyer, and former politician.

== Biography ==
Javier Ernesto Simán Dada was born in El Salvador on 14 June 1964. His parents are Teofilo Jose Simán Jacir and María Elena Dada de Simán.

He obtained his Bachelors Degree in Business from Loyola University in New Orleans (BBA 1986) and then his Juris Doctor Degree from Loyola University School of Law (JD 1990). He later attended Georgetown Law School in Washington, D.C., and Harvard Law School in Cambridge, Massachusetts.

He has been a successful businessman in retailing, textile and apparel industries, energy, agriculture, banking and insurance. He was CEO and COO of several companies. He retired from executive responsibilities and remained as Chief Legal Counsel and board member for several companies.

He has been an active member of several business associations promoting economic growth, free trade and rule of law. He first joined the Salvadorian Chamber of Commerce, assumed as Vice-President of the Salvadorian Textile and Apparel Industry Association (CAMTEX 2005-2017), President of the Salvadorian Industrial Association (ASI 2010-2017), Director and President of the Central American Federation of Industrial Associations (FECAICA 2010-2018), Director of the National Association of Private Enterprise (ANEP 2011-2018), Director of the Central American Federation of Private Sector Associations (FEDEPRICAP 2020-2022) and then again President of ANEP from 2020-2022.

In the 2019 presidential election, he was a pre-candidate for the Nationalist Republican Alliance (ARENA), but lost the party's nomination to Carlos Calleja, who went on to compete against Nayib Bukele.

In April 2020, he was elected as the president of the National Association of Private Enterprise (ANEP) and served until April 2022. As highest representantive of the private sector, he pushed for Rule of Law as the fundamental requisite for economic growth and prosperity. He also fought against corruption and abuses of power, and demanded respect for the Constitution, separation of powers, judiciary independence and individual rights. He was politically harassed and persecuted for his firm stand. He was succeeded by Agustín Martínez.

Javier Siman is now retired from political and leadership activities and is now focused on his personal businesses.
