= Victoria Marina Velásquez =

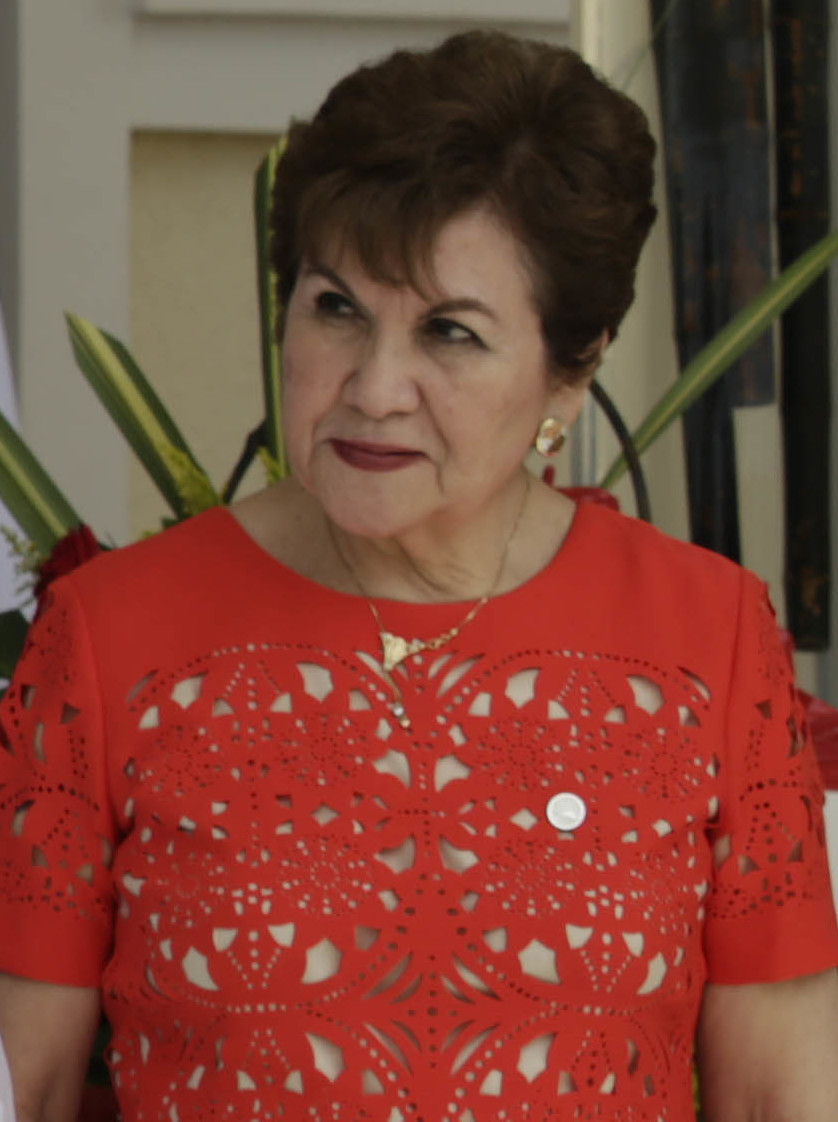

Secretary General of the Central American Integration System
- In office 27 June 2014 – 29 June 2017
- Preceded by: Hugo Martínez
- Succeeded by: Vinicio Cerezo

Chairperson of the Governing Body of the International Labour Organization
- In office 2013–2014

Ambassador of El Salvador to Switzerland; Permanent representative of El Salvador at the United Nations Office at Geneva
- In office 1 June 2011 – May 2014
- President: Mauricio Funes

Minister of Labor and Social Welfare
- In office 1 June 2009 – 31 May 2011
- President: Mauricio Funes

Inspector General for the Defense of Human Rights
- In office 1995–1998

Personal details
- Born: 5 July 1943 (age 83) Usulután, El Salvador
- Party: Farabundo Martí National Liberation Front
- Spouse: Carlos Sergio Avilés
- Education: University of El Salvador
- Occupation: Lawyer

Victoria Marina Velásquez de Avilés (born 5 July 1943) is a Salvadoran jurist.

== Biography ==
Victoria Marina Velásquez was born in Usulután in 1943. In 1974, she graduated from the University of El Salvador as a doctor of jurisprudence and social sciences.

In 1979, she was appointed undersecretary of the Ministry of Labor and Social Welfare by the first Revolutionary Government Junta, but in January 1980, she resigned from this position along with several other officials, citing the Junta's inability to control human rights violations and its failure to implement agrarian and social reforms. In the 1980s she worked as a lawyer in free practice, advising social organizations on human rights and labor relations, as well as acting as a notary.

After the signing of the Chapultepec Peace Accords in 1992, she was named Deputy Prosecutor of the Rights of the Child, and in 1995 she was elected as head of the Office of the Inspector General for the Defense of Human Rights. Serving until 1998, she received international recognition for her commitment to consolidate the institution established in the Peace Accords in the sense of genuine surveillance of abuses of power and human rights violations committed by agents of the state. However, the right-wing parties represented in the Legislative Assembly rejected her reelection and chose Eduardo Peñate Polanco as her successor, despite his lack of background in human rights work.

In 1998 she was proposed as a presidential candidate by the National Convention of the Farabundo Martí National Liberation Front, along with the mayor of San Salvador, Héctor Silva. After a prolonged debate, the convention decided not to choose either of them, and opted for a consensus candidate, Facundo Guardado.

In 2000, Velásquez was elected as a magistrate of the Supreme Court for a term of nine years, exercising her duties in the Civil Chamber from 2000 to 2003 and the Constitutional Chamber from 2003 to 2009. As a constitutional magistrate, she maintained a progressive profile with a focus on human rights.

On 1 June 2009, President Mauricio Funes appointed her Minister of Labor and Social Welfare in the first left-wing government elected by popular vote. In this position, she undertook to promote the freedom of association of public employees and the strict application of labor legislation. President Funes replaced her in 2011, but appointed her as ambassador of El Salvador to Switzerland and permanent representative at the United Nations Office at Geneva, positions she held from June 2011 to May 2014. In 2013 she was elected for a one-year term as chairperson of the Governing Body of the International Labour Organization.

In June 2014, she was elected by the Summit of Heads of State and Government of Central America as Secretary General of the Central American Integration System for a three-year term.
