= Erick Iván Ortiz =

Salvadoran activist, politician (born 1991)

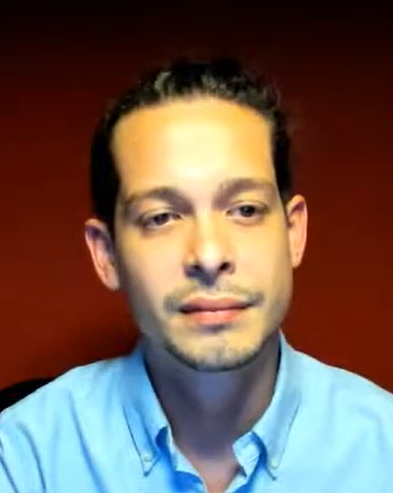
- Ortiz in 2022
- Born: Erick Iván Ortiz Godoy; February 14, 1991 (age 35); Santa Ana, El Salvador
- Education: Escuela Superior de Economía y Negocios, Luis Amigó Catholic University, George Mason University
- Occupations: Politician, LGBTQ+ activist
- Political party: Nuestro Tiempo

Erick Iván Ortiz Godoy (born February 14, 1991) is a Salvadoran a LGBTQ+ activist and politician. He is a member of the Salvadoran LGBTI+ Federation, and is one of the country's most visible activists. In the 2021 elections, he ran for the Legislative Assembly in El Salvador, becoming the first openly gay man to aspire to a legislative position in the country.

== Life and career ==
Erick Iván Ortiz Godoy was born on February 14, 1991, in Santa Ana, El Salvador. He studied economics at Escuela Superior de Economía y Negocios (English: Higher School of Economics and Business), and later studied human rights at the Luis Amigó Catholic University in Medellín, Colombia. Additionally he trained in social leadership from George Mason University in Fairfax County, Virginia, United States.

Following the series of homophobic comments that took place during the 2014 presidential elections, he decided the following year in 2015 to create, along with other activists, the Colectivo Normal (English: Normal Collective). The Colectivo Normal is a social and cultural activism group that sought to influence the fight against sexist and homophobic violence and discrimination through protest and art. Later, other organizations joined the Colectivo Normal, and formed the Salvadoran LGBTI+ Federation.

He began his political career as part of the Nationalist Republican Alliance (ARENA) the conservative political party, where he was director of the national youth wing. He later joined the Nuestro Tiempo (English: Our Time) party, made up mostly of young people, and served as its director of political affairs.

For the 2021 legislative and municipal elections, he ran for the Legislative Assembly under the Nuestro Tiempo party, becoming the first openly gay man to seek a legislative position in the country's history. His proposals included the passage of an anti-discrimination law and a gender identity law. During the election campaign, Ortiz was barred from promoting himself in traditional media outlets for attempting to reclaim the term "culero" as part of his campaign slogan and suffered discrimination from passersby because of his sexual orientation. He was ultimately not elected, but received more than ten thousand votes in the district he represented, the department of San Salvador.

In early 2022, he joined the Global Equality Caucus initiative, which had officially launched in Latin America that year. Ortiz continued to lead the Colectivo Normal, in addition to serving as the communications secretary for the Salvadoran LGBTI+ Federation. In 2022, Ortiz received death threats, which he publicly denounced. The perpetrators of the death threats were never identified.
