= Hugo Martínez (politician) =

Salvadoran politician

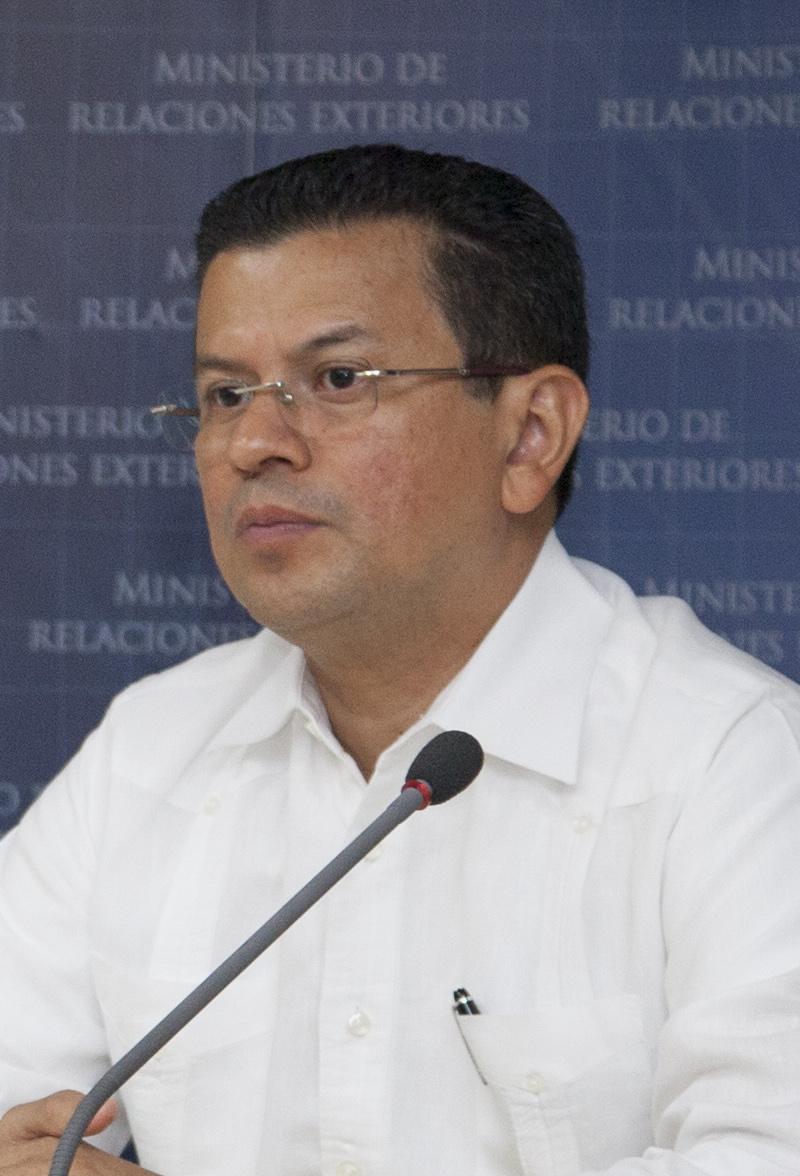
- Martínez in 2016

Minister of Foreign Affairs of El Salvador
- In office 1 June 2014 – 28 May 2018
- President: Salvador Sánchez Cerén
- Preceded by: Jaime Miranda
- Succeeded by: Carlos Alfredo Castaneda
- In office 1 June 2009 – 20 July 2013
- President: Mauricio Funes
- Preceded by: Marisol Argueta de Barillas
- Succeeded by: Jaime Miranda

Secretary General of the Central American Integration System
- In office 20 July 2013 – 30 May 2014
- Preceded by: Juan Daniel Alemán
- Succeeded by: Victoria Marina Velásquez

Deputy of the Legislative Assembly of El Salvador from San Salvador
- In office 1 May 2003 – 30 April 2009

Personal details
- Born: Hugo Roger Martínez Bonilla; 2 January 1968 (age 58) Polorós, El Salvador
- Party: Farabundo Martí National Liberation Front
- Education: University of El Salvador
- Occupation: Industrial engineer Diplomat

Hugo Roger Martínez Bonilla (born 2 January 1968) is a Salvadoran industrial engineer, politician, diplomat and writer. He is a member of the Farabundo Martí National Liberation Front (FMLN), one of the two major political parties in El Salvador. Martínez served as Foreign Minister of El Salvador from 2009 until 2013 under former President Mauricio Funes and again from 2014 to 2018 within the government of President Salvador Sánchez Cerén. In 2019, being the ruling party presidential candidate, he came 3rd with 14%.

== 2019 presidential election ==
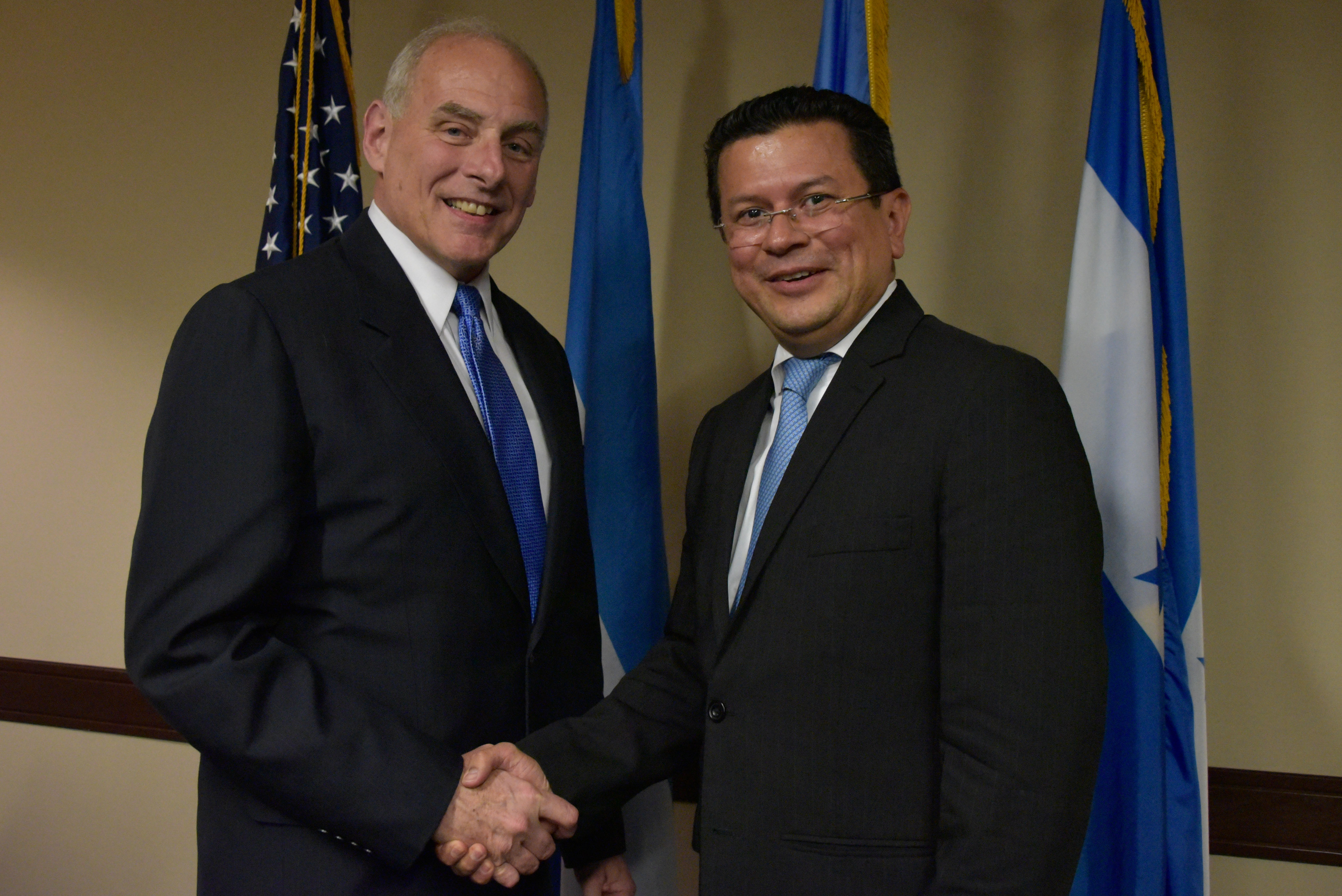
Martinez meets with U.S. Secretary of Homeland Security John Kelly in Washington, D.C., on 18 May 2017.

In April 2018, Martínez announced that he would resign from the foreign ministry in order to seek the Farabundo Martí National Liberation Front (FMLN) party nomination in the forthcoming 2019 presidential election. On 27 May 2018, Martinez won the FMLN presidential nomination in the internal party election. Martínez won the party nomination with 20,259 votes to defeat his primary opponent, former Minister of Public Works Gerson Martínez. FMLN party members also selected Karina Sosa, a deputy in the National Assembly, as Martinez's running mate for Vice President of El Salvador. Sosa run unopposed for the vice presidential nomination.

During the campaign, Martínez promised to continue the crime prevention Safe El Salvador Plan created by outgoing President Salvador Sánchez Cerén, which stations the National Civil Police of El Salvador throughout the country. Martínez also pledged to support several social programs begun by President Sánchez and create education and development initiatives in rural areas.

By late January 2019, just days before election, Martínez was polling in third place behind front runner Nayib Bukele of the Grand Alliance for National Unity and businessman Carlos Calleja of the Nationalist Republican Alliance (ARENA). The presidential election was held on 3 February 2019.

Political offices
Preceded by Marisol Argueta de Barillas	Minister of Foreign Affairs of El Salvador; 2009–2013	Succeeded by Jaime Miranda
Preceded by Jaime Miranda	Minister of Foreign Affairs of El Salvador; 2014–2018	Succeeded by Carlos Alfredo Castaneda
Party political offices
Preceded by Salvador Sánchez Cerén (2014)	FMLN nominee for President of El Salvador; 2019	Succeeded by Manuel Flores (2024)
