= Escuela Superior de Economía y Negocios =

Higher School of Economics and Business
- Escuela Superior de Economía y Negocios
- Other name: ESEN
- Officer in charge: Everardo Rivera
- Rector: Ricardo Poma
- Location: Santa Tecla, El Salvador; 13.6553°N 89.2860°W
- Website: www.esen.edu.sv

Escuela Superior de Economía y Negocios (ESEN) (English: Higher School of Economics and Business) is a private, non-profit university in La Libertad, El Salvador. It was founded in 1994. In 1997, ESEN opened an Entrepreneur Center, a unit whose mission is to promote and develop entrepreneurship among employers to create jobs.

== Academic authorities ==
- Ricardo Poma - Rector
- Everardo Rivera - General Director
- Carmen Aida Lazo - Dean of Economics and Business
- Albino Tinetti - Dean of Law
- Sven Mauricio Guzman - Dean of Business Engineering

== Student organizations ==
- Un Techo Para Mi País
- Sociedad de Alumnos Emprendedores (SAE)
- Model United Nations (MUN)
- Rotaract
- Pasitos
- ESENarte
- AIESEC
- HOPE

== Notable alumni ==
- Erick Iván Ortiz (born 1991) Salvadoran activist, politician
