= Carlos Calleja =

Salvadoran businessman and politician

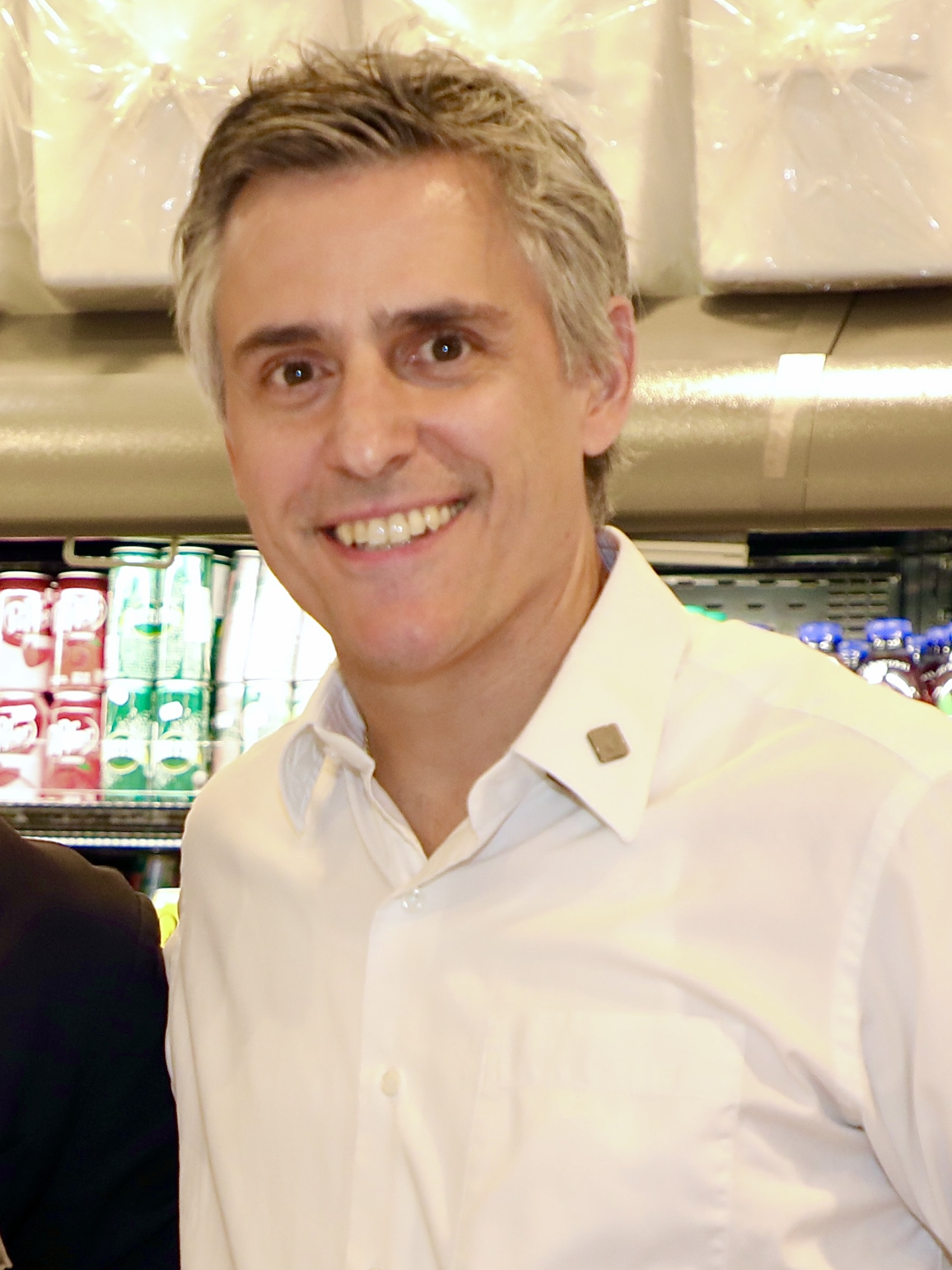
- Calleja in 2026
- Born: Juan Carlos Calleja Hakker; 11 February 1976 (age 50); San Salvador, El Salvador
- Education: Middlebury College; New York University Stern School of Business
- Occupations: Businessman, politician
- Organization(s): Supermercados Super Selectos; Grupo Éxito
- Political party: Nationalist Republican Alliance
- Spouse: Andrea Lima Guirola (m. 2011)

Juan Carlos Calleja Hakker (born 11 February 1976) is a Salvadoran businessman and former politician. Calleja is currently the CEO of Grupo Éxito and the vice president of the Calleja Group, which owns Supermercados Super Selectos, the largest supermarket chain in El Salvador. He was the presidential candidate for the Nationalist Republican Alliance (ARENA) during the 2019 presidential election. He received 31.72 percent of the vote and came in second place to Nayib Bukele, the election's winner.

== Biography ==
Juan Carlos Calleja Hakker was born on 11 February 1976 in San Salvador, El Salvador. His parents are Francisco Calleja, a businessman, and Maureen Hakker. Calleja is a third-generation immigrant from Spain. During the Salvadoran Civil War (1979–1992), Calleja and his family moved to the United States. In 1999, he obtained a degree in liberal arts from Middlebury College. In 2005, he obtained a Masters in Business Administration from the New York University Stern School of Business.

Calleja is the vice president of the Calleja Group. In 2014, Calleja founded the Calleja Foundation. The foundation supports agricultural social projects and has received support from former United States president Bill Clinton and Mexican billionaire Carlos Slim. On 21 March 2024, Calleja became the CEO of the Grupo Éxito, a Colombian retail company.

In 2011, Calleja married Andrea Lima Guirola. The couple has two children: Santiago and Miranda. Calleja is a fan of Alianza F.C. and Real Madrid.

== Political career ==
Calleja joined the right-wing Nationalist Republican Alliance (ARENA) in 2013. After joining the party, he was a potential candidate to acquire ARENA's presidential nomination for the 2014 presidential election. Calleja ultimately did not attain the party's nomination, which instead nominated Norman Quijano, the mayor of San Salvador.

=== 2019 presidential election ===
On 3 July 2017, Calleja announced his intention to run for president in the 2019 presidential election with ARENA. He officially registered his candidacy on 10 November 2017. In December 2017, Calleja was one of three pre-candidates, including businessmen Javier Simán and Gustavo López Davidson, to be confirmed by ARENA to participate in the party's primary election. On 22 April 2018, Calleja won the party's presidential nomination with 34,670 votes, or 60.80 percent. On 18 July 2018, Carmen Aída Lazo of the National Coalition Party (PCN) was confirmed as Calleja's running mate. On 26 July 2018, ARENA, the PCN, the Christian Democratic Party (PDC), and Salvadoran Democracy (DS) formed a coalition for the presidency with Calleja and Lazo as its presidential and vice presidential candidates, respectively; the coalition was called the Alliance for a New Country.

Throughout the election campaign, Calleja polled in second place after Grand Alliance for National Unity (GANA) candidate Nayib Bukele. Calleja stated that he would promote economic growth by aiming to create 300,000 jobs and develop the country's tourism, agriculture, and technology industries. He also stated that he would "execute more [crime] prevention programs" and reform the National Civil Police in an effort to combat crime in the country. Calleja stated that populism "threatens" ("amenaza") El Salvador. Calleja's campaign was supported by Salvadoran conservatives, businesses, and evangelicals. Calleja participated in both presidential debates, the first hosted by the University of El Salvador on 16 December 2018 and the second hosted by the Salvadoran Association of Broadcasters on 13 January 2019.

On 3 February 2019, Calleja received 857,084 votes, or 31.72 percent. Although he had previously stated that he believed he would win in the first round, Calleja came in second place behind Bukele, who won an outright majority and was elected as president. Calleja conceded the election to Bukele, stating "We recognize the results of these elections. We are going to call the president-elect to wish him luck in facing the challenges in this country". After Calleja's electoral defeat in 2019, he left politics.

== Electoral history ==
The following table shows Calleja's electoral history.

Year	Office	Type	Party	Main opponent	Party	Votes for Calleja				Result	Swing	Ref.
Year	Office	Type	Party	Main opponent	Party	Total	%	P.	±%	Result	Swing	Ref.
2019	President of El Salvador	General	ARENA–PCN–PDC–DS	Nayib Bukele	GANA	857,084	31.72	2nd	N/A	Lost	Gain	
