= List of ministers of foreign affairs of El Salvador =

This is a list of foreign ministers of El Salvador from 1922 to the present day.

- 1922–1923: Arturo Ramón Ávila
- 1923–1927: Reyes Arrieta Rossi
- 1927–1928: José Gustavo Guerrero
- 1928–1931: Francisco Martínez Suárez
- 1931............ Héctor David Castro
- 1931............ Reyes Arrieta Rossi
- 1931–1942: Miguel Ángel Araujo
- 1942–1944: Arturo Ramón Ávila
- 1944............ Julio Enrique Ávila Villafañe
- 1944–1945: Reyes Arrieta Rossi
- 1945............ Arturo Argüello Loucel
- 1945–1946: Héctor Escobar Serrano
- 1946............ Manuel Castro Ramírez
- 1946–1948: José Antonio Quiroz
- 1948–1950: Miguel Rafael Urquía
- 1950–1954: Roberto Edmundo Canessa Gutiérrez
- 1954–1955: José Guillermo Trabanino Guerrero
- 1955–1956: Carlos Azúcar Chávez
- 1956–1960: Alfredo Ortiz Mancía
- 1960–1961: Rolando Déneke
- 1961............ Raúl Gamero
- 1961–1962: Rafael Eguizabal Tobías
- 1962–1965: Héctor Escobar Serrano
- 1965–1967: Roberto Eugenio Quirós
- 1967–1968: Alfredo Martínez Moreno
- 1968–1971: Francisco José Guerrero Cienfuegos
- 1971–1972: Walter Béneke Medina
- 1972–1977: Mauricio Borgonovo
- 1977–1978: Álvaro Ernesto Martínez
- 1978–1979: José Antonio Rodríguez Porth
- 1979–1980: Alfonso Perez Cuntaspana
- 1980–1982: José Napoleón Duarte
- 1982–1984: Fidel Chávez Mena
- 1984–1985: Jorge Eduardo Tenorio
- 1985–1986: Rodolfo Antonio Castillo Claramount
- 1986–1989: Ricardo Acevedo Peralta
- 1989–1993: José Manuel Pacas Castro
- 1993–1994: Miguel Ángel Salaverría
- 1994–1995: Óscar Alfredo Santamaría
- 1995–1999: Ramón Ernesto González Giner
- 1999–2004: María Eugenia Brizuela de Ávila
- 2004–2008: Francisco Laínez
- 2008–2009: Marisol Argueta de Barillas
- 2009–2013: Hugo Martínez
- 2013–2014: Jaime Miranda
- 2014–2018: Hugo Martínez
- 2018–2019: Carlos Alfredo Castaneda (acting)
- 2019–present: Alexandra Hill Tinoco

== Sources ==
- Rulers.org – Foreign ministers E–K
