= Teresa Manning =

Teresa Manning is an American political activist, former public official, and Policy Director of the National Association of Scholars. She served as deputy assistant secretary for the Office of Population Affairs in the United States Department of Health and Human Services (HHS) in the Trump administration from May 2017 to January 12, 2018.

== Career ==
Manning has worked for two American anti-abortion advocacy groups: as a lobbyist for the National Right to Life Committee and as a legislative analyst for the Family Research Council. In these roles, she advanced the view that contraception "doesn't work", and criticized the use of the abortifacient mifepristone as well as emergency contraception.

In May 2017, the Trump administration appointed Manning to the post of deputy assistant secretary for the Office of Population Affairs. This made her responsible for the Title X family planning program, which provides family planning and related preventive health services to mainly low-income or uninsured people. On January 12, 2018, Politico reported that Manning had been fired from HHS and had been escorted off the premises. HHS denied this and said that she had resigned.

In 2019, Manning was appointed Director of the National Association of Scholars' Title IX Project. The following year, NAS published her 144-page report, Dear Colleague: The Weaponization of Title IX.
