= Office of the Assistant Secretary for Health =

Component of the U.S. Department of Health and Human Services

Agency overview
- Agency executive: Brian Christine, Assistant Secretary for Health
- Parent department: United States Department of Health and Human Services (United States Public Health Service)
- Website: www.hhs.gov/ash/index.html

The Office of the Assistant Secretary for Health (OASH) is a staff office of the U.S. Department of Health and Human Services (HHS). It is led by the assistant secretary for health, who serves as the senior advisor on public health and science issues to the secretary of health and human services. The office serves as the focal point for leadership and coordination across the department in public health and science, provides direction to program offices within OASH, and provides advice and counsel on public health and science issues to the secretary.

== History ==
The Office of the Assistant Secretary for Health and Scientific Affairs was established on January 1, 1967, following Reorganization Plan No. 3 of 1966. It was renamed to the Office of the Assistant Secretary for Health on November 9, 1972. It was replaced by the Office of Public Health and Science (OPHS) on October 31, 1995, and renamed back to OASH on July 29, 2010.

== Organization ==
As of 2025, OASH's component offices are:

- Office of the Surgeon General
  - Public Health Service Commissioned Corps
- Office of Climate Change and Health Equity
- Office of Disease Prevention and Health Promotion
  - President's Council on Sports, Fitness, and Nutrition
- Office for Human Research Protections
- Office of Infectious Disease and HIV/AIDS Policy
- Office of Long COVID Research and Practice
- Office of Minority Health
- Office of Population Affairs
- Office of Research Integrity
- Office on Women's Health

The National Vaccine Program Office was a former component that existed during 1986–2019.
