= List of people with long COVID =

This is a list of notable people with long COVID, an umbrella term for persistent health problems triggered by COVID-19. People on this list may currently have long COVID, have recovered, or have died. In 2023, it was estimated that more than 65,000,000 people on Earth have long COVID.

== Athletes ==
- Beth Dobbin (born 1994) British runner and Olympic athlete
- Asia Durr (born 1997), American basketball player who last played for the Louisville Cardinals
- Hughie Fury (born 1994), British boxer
- Eddie Hall (born 1988), British strongman
- Maia Lumdsen (born 1998), Scottish professional tennis player
- Rebecca Mehra (born 1994), American middle-distance runner
- Reece Oxford (born 1998), English footballer for FC Augsburg
- Rasmus Ristolainen (born 1994), Finnish hockey player for the Philadelphia Flyers
- Eduardo Rodriguez (born 1993) Baseball pitcher for the Boston Red Sox, currently with the Arizona Diamondbacks
- Selina Rutz-Büchel (born 1991), Swiss runner
- Branton Sutter (born 1989), Canadian former hockey player
- Jonathan Toews (born 1988), Canadian hockey player who last played for the Chicago Blackhawks

== Performers ==
- Jeff Bridges (born 1949), American actor
- Jonathan Davis (born 1971), American and lead singer of Korn
- Billie Eilish (born 2001), American singer
- Colin Farrell (born 1976), Irish actor
- Casey Frey (born 1993), American dancer and comedian
- Mick Hucknall (born 1960), British singer and songwriter
- David Lindley (1944-2023), American musician
- Matt McGorry (born 1986), American actor
- Sérgio Mendes (1941–2024), Brazilian musician
- Stephin Merritt (born 1965), American songwriter and singer for The Magnetic Fields
- Alyssa Milano (born 1972), American actress
- Dave Navarro (born 1967), American guitarist for Jane's Addiction
- Emma Samms (born 1960), British actress
- Paul Simon (born 1941), American singer and songwriter
- Tilda Swinton (born 1960), British actress
- Will Toledo (born 1992), American singer and guitarist for Car Seat Headrest
- Brooke Lewis Bellas (born 1975) - American Actress

== Public Figures ==
- Dianna Cowern (known online as Physics Girl) (born 1989), science education YouTuber
- Chris Cuomo (born 1970), American television journalist and anchor
- Hannah E. Davis, data scientist and long COVID researcher
- Gill Deacon (born 1966), Canadian author and broadcaster
- Derek Draper (1967–2024), English former lobbyist
- Rose George, British journalist, writer, and recreational runner
- Ian Goodfellow, American computer scientist, engineer, and researcher
- Mark Haddon (born 1962), British novelist
- Catherine Heymans (born c. 1979), British astrophysicist
- Jim Inhofe (1934–2024), retired United States senator
- Tim Kaine (born 1958), United States senator
- Jackie Ellen Last (known as Jackie O) (born 1975), Australian radio and TV personality
- Patricia Lockwood (born 1982), American author
- Andrea McLean (born 1969), Scottish journalist and TV presenter
- Madeline Miller (born 1978), American writer
- David Mixner (1946–2024), American political activist and author
- Gwyneth Paltrow (born 1972) American Actress and Businesswoman
- Michael Osborne (born 1982), Australian professor of machine learning
- Kerri Rawson (born 1978), American author and crime victim's rights activist
- Michael Rosen (born 1946), British writer and poet
