= Hannah E. Davis =

American data scientist

Hannah E. Davis (born 1988 or 1989) is an American artist, data scientist and long COVID researcher. She was one of the founders of the Patient-Led Research Collaborative (PLRC), a group of long COVID patients with experience in research or data analysis. Research early in the COVID-19 pandemic by the PLRC mapped how a COVID-19 infection could have long-term debilitating effects, even for young and previously healthy people. It was used for the CDC's documentation on long COVID.

== Education ==
Davis studied international relations, and later spent time in Ghana. For her masters, she studied creative communication technology at New York University.

== Machine learning and art ==
Davis's work as a generative artist focused on music, sentiment analysis and bias in datasets.

A major theme of Davis's work was translating text into music, particularly generating music from the emotional data of the text. One of the projects Davis worked on turned publicly available books into music, generating music based on the emotion of the input text. Initially, her analysis was able to pick up the "rhythm" of books, for instance short sentences for Ernest Hemingway, and more flowery rhythms for work from Virginia Woolf. She built this work using a resource by Saif Mohammad, who had developed a lexicon mapping a large set of words onto eight basic emotions. The resulting tool, Transprose, created short musical pieces that mirrored the emotional tone of various novels.

She used a similar algorithm to generate melodies based on news articles, which were used to collaborate with composer Mathieu Lamboley to create a symphony for a 50-person orchestra. This was performed in the Louvre in Paris, France.

She was commissioned by the Italian art collective D20 to produce a piece played on a factory-turned instrument, called "Fabbrica Alta". Her piece "Percival", commissioned by SynthBeats Laptop Orchestra, was a piece designed to be played by six performers and also focused on subjective interpretation of text translated into music.

In 2019, Davis co-created an installation called The Laughing Room with author Jonny Sun. They trained an AI on standup comedy transcripts from women, nonbinary, and BIPOC comedians to learn what was funny; the AI was then placed in a room with chairs and a sofa, and people could talk to it to try evoking a laughing response. This was installed at the 2019 TED Conference, with additional installations at the Cambridge Public Library and The New American Festival.

Davis often presented on bias in machine learning datasets and about her own work; she regularly spoke at international art-tech festivals including Eyeo, Strange Loop, and Kikk Festival. In 2019, she opened the renowned Transmediale, an annual festival for art and digital culture in Berlin. In September 2019, the Library of Congress invited her to speak as part of their Machine Learning + Libraries report on the state of the field, where she advocated that "a dataset is a worldview" and that "classification is violence" while urging caution in choosing input data used to train machine learning models.

== Long COVID research and advocacy ==
Davis got COVID-19 in the first wave, in March 2020. At this point, the public health narrative was that people either fully recovered from COVID or died. Davis developed neurological issues that did not pass, including cognitive deficits (not being able to concentrate) and dysautonomia (dysfunction of the autonomic nervous system). When she still had severe symptoms after three weeks and her physician attributed her symptoms to ADHD, she started to look for others experiencing the longer-term effects of COVID-19.

A New York Times article by Fiona Lowenstein detailed a similar experience. At this point, she joined the Body Politic COVID-19 support group founded by Lowenstein. In their "data nerds" Slack channel, she connected with other people with a science or data background. Together they founded the Patient-Led Research Collaborative (PLRC). In April 2020, the PLRC collected data on people with prolonged COVID-19 symptoms, and a month later they were the first to publish a report on long COVID.

The work done by PLRC gained prominence after Ed Yong wrote a piece on it for The Atlantic, interviewing Davis and other patient-researchers. The CDC and NIH started contacting the group to share analysis. The early CDC documentation for long COVID was informed by PLRC's analysis, especially around what was happening to young and previously healthy people. PLRC mapped how long COVID symptoms changed over time.

Davis co-authored the World Health Organization's case definition of post COVID-19 condition, published in 2021. She was still only able to work a couple hours per day at that point. She authored and co-authored various highly cited research papers. In a study published in The Lancet's subsidiary journal eClinicalMedicine, she detailed how symptoms changed over time in the first 7 months after infection. She authored a 2023 review of long COVID in Nature Reviews Microbiology, co-authored by cardiologist Eric Topol. In 2024, she co-authored another review of long Covid in Nature Medicine along with Eric Topol, Akiko Iwasaki, and Ziyad Al-Aly.

In July 2022, she testified for the COVID-19 select committee in the US House of Representatives.

== Publications ==
- Davis HE, Assaf GS, McCorkell L, Wei H, Low RJ, Re'em Y, Redfield S, Austin JP, Akrami A (August 2021). "Characterizing long COVID in an international cohort: 7 months of symptoms and their impact". eClinicalMedicine. 38 101019. doi:10.1016/j.eclinm.2021.101019. PMC 8280690. PMID 34308300.
- Soriano JB, Allan M, Alsokhn C, Alwan NA, Askie L, Davis HE, Diaz JV, Dua T, De Groote W, Jakob R, Lado M, Marshall J, Murthy S, Preller S, Relan P, Schiess N, Seahwag A. "A clinical case definition of post COVID-19 condition by a Delphi consensus, 6 October 2021". World Health Organization. Archived from the original on April 23, 2022.
- Davis HE, McCorkell L, Vogel JM, Topol EJ (March 2023). "Long COVID: major findings, mechanisms and recommendations". Nature Reviews Microbiology. 21 (3): 133–146. doi:10.1038/s41579-022-00846-2. PMC 9839201. PMID 36639608.
- Al-Aly Z, Davis H, McCorkell L, Soares L, Wulf-Hanson S, Iwasaki A, Topol EJ. Long COVID science, research and policy. Nature Medicine. volume 30, pages 2148–2164 (2024). https://doi.org/10.1038/s41591-024-03173-6

== See also ==
- Lisa McCorkell
