= Lisa McCorkell =

American public health researcher

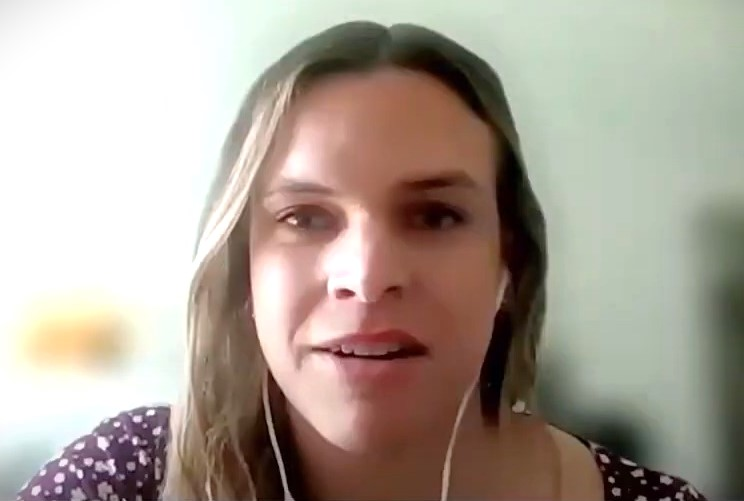
McCorkell speaks at FDA Virtual Public Meeting in 2023

Lisa McCorkell is an American public health researcher, policy analyst and Long COVID advocate who co-founded the Patient-Led Research Collaborative (PLRC). McCorkell co-founded PLRC together with Hannah Davis and three others with Long COVID, several of whom had prior research experience. They were frustrated with the lack of research on long-term impacts of a COVID-19 infection in the early days of the COVID-19 pandemic. PLRC would publish the first major long COVID study. She was named one of Nature’s 10 in 2022, recognising her as a person "who shaped science in 2022".

== Education and personal life ==
McCorkell studied Political Science for her Bachelor at the University of California, Los Angeles, and obtained her Masters in Public Policy from University of California, Berkeley. As of 2021, she worked as a policy analyst at the California Department of Social Services, on CalFresh. She has done research on the topic of employment and labor, such as a study on the effect of stable scheduling for retail workers.

McCorkell got a mild bout of COVID-19 in March 2020. By August, she had started to feel better and joined an exercise class, which resulted in an emergency room visit due to breathing problems. She was later diagnosed with postural orthostatic tachycardia syndrome and also has had post-exertional malaise that makes other symptoms worse.

== Patient-Led Research Collaborative ==
After reading an article on Long COVID by Fiona Lowenstein in The New York Times, McCorkell and other future founders of the Patient-Led Research Collaborative (PLRC) joined the Body Politic COVID-19 Support Group. A team was formed to study Long COVID. Gina Assaf launched an initial survey in April 2020 and McCorkell helped analyse what would be the first research published on Long COVID a few weeks later. The survey highlighted that neurological problems were common in COVID. A second survey detailed how symptoms evolved over a period of 7 months.

McCorkell co-founded the PLRC with four other women with long COVID. The organisation does research itself, but also gives advice on how to design research and funds studies into long COVID and other chronic conditions. In 2021, McCorkell testified before the House Committee on Energy and Commerce, Subcommittee on Health. McCorkell left the PLRC in 2025.

== Selected publications ==
- Davis HE, Assaf GS, McCorkell L, Wei H, Low RJ, Re'em Y, Redfield S, Austin JP, Akrami A. Characterizing long COVID in an international cohort: 7 months of symptoms and their impact. eClinicalMedicine. 38:101019 (2021). https://doi.org/10.1016/j.eclinm.2021.101019
- Davis HE, McCorkell L, Vogel JM, Topol EJ. Long COVID: major findings, mechanisms, and recommendations. Nature Reviews Microbiology. 21(3): 133-146 (2023). https://doi.org/10.1038/s41579-022-00846-2
- Al-Aly Z, Davis H, McCorkell L, Soares L, Wulf-Hanson S, Iwasaki A, Topol EJ. Long COVID science, research and policy. Nature Medicine. volume 30, pages 2148–2164 (2024). https://doi.org/10.1038/s41591-024-03173-6

== See also ==
- Patient participation
