= My Gym Children's Fitness Center =

Worldwide fitness center for children

- Founded: 1983; 43 years ago
- Headquarters: Sherman Oaks, California
- Website: www.mygym.com

My Gym Children's Fitness Center is a worldwide fitness center for children between the ages of 4 months to 10 years. The company was formed in 1983 by Yacov and Susi Sherman and today has over 700 units worldwide.

My Gym offers fitness classes, birthday parties, summer camps, and events for children ages six weeks to nine or ten years old. My Gym programs include movement, tumbling, and exercise.

In the fall of 2008, My Gym won a Parent's Choice award for their DVD My Gym at Home, Fun With Monique. My Gym funded the children's entertainment group The Activators, which formed a partnership with The President's Challenge in 2011.
