= Sherman Oaks, Los Angeles =

Sherman Oaks, California
- Neighborhood of Los Angeles
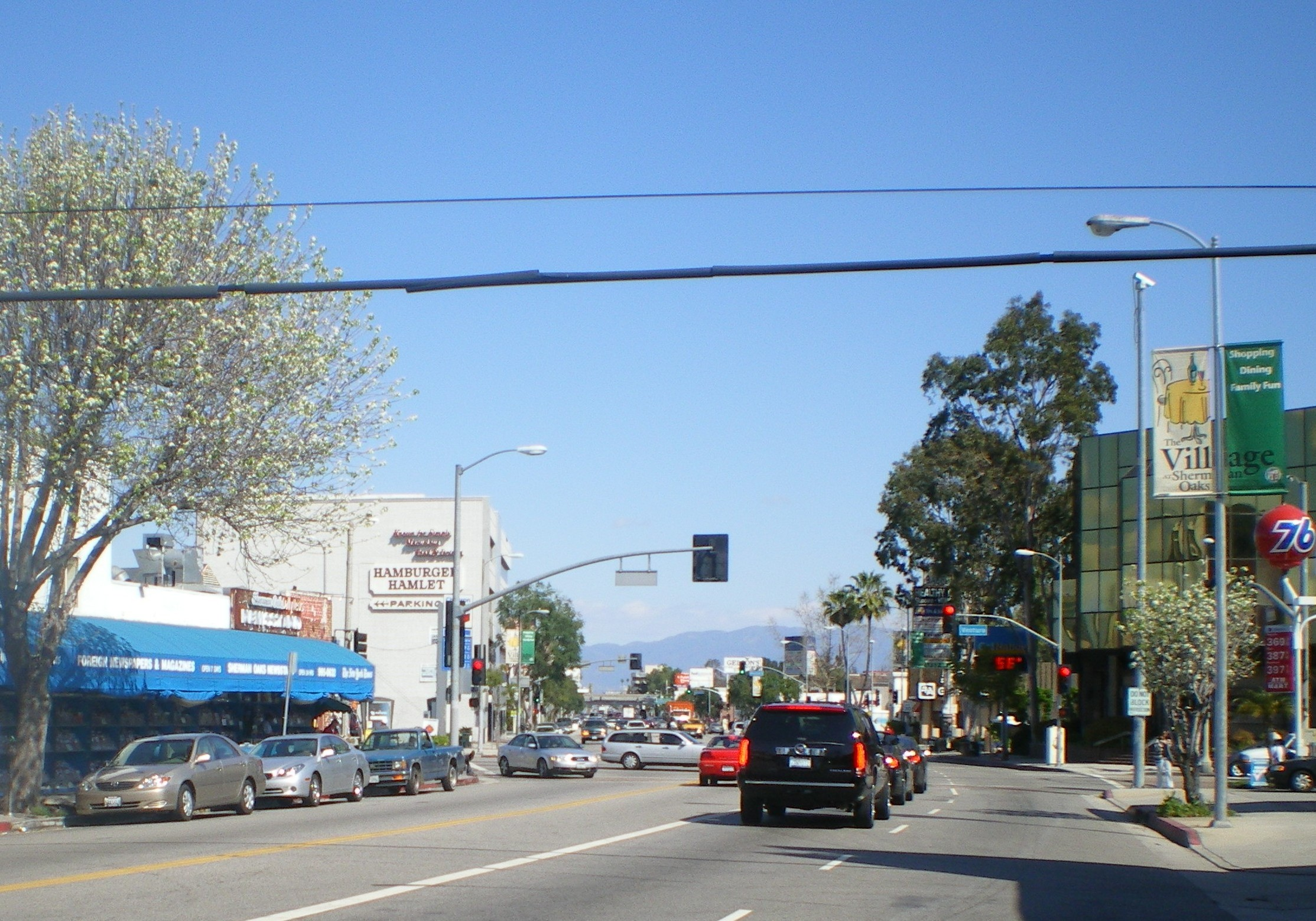
- Van Nuys Boulevard in Sherman Oaks

- Location within Los Angeles
- Coordinates: 34°09′04″N 118°26′54″W
- Country: United States
- State: California
- County: Los Angeles
- City: Los Angeles
- Founded: 1927
- Named for: Moses Sherman
- ZIP Codes: 91401, 91403, 91413, 91423, 91495
- Area codes: 747, 818
- Website: shermanoaksnc.org

Sherman Oaks is a neighborhood in the city of Los Angeles. Located within the San Fernando Valley region, the neighborhood includes a portion of the Santa Monica Mountains.

== History ==
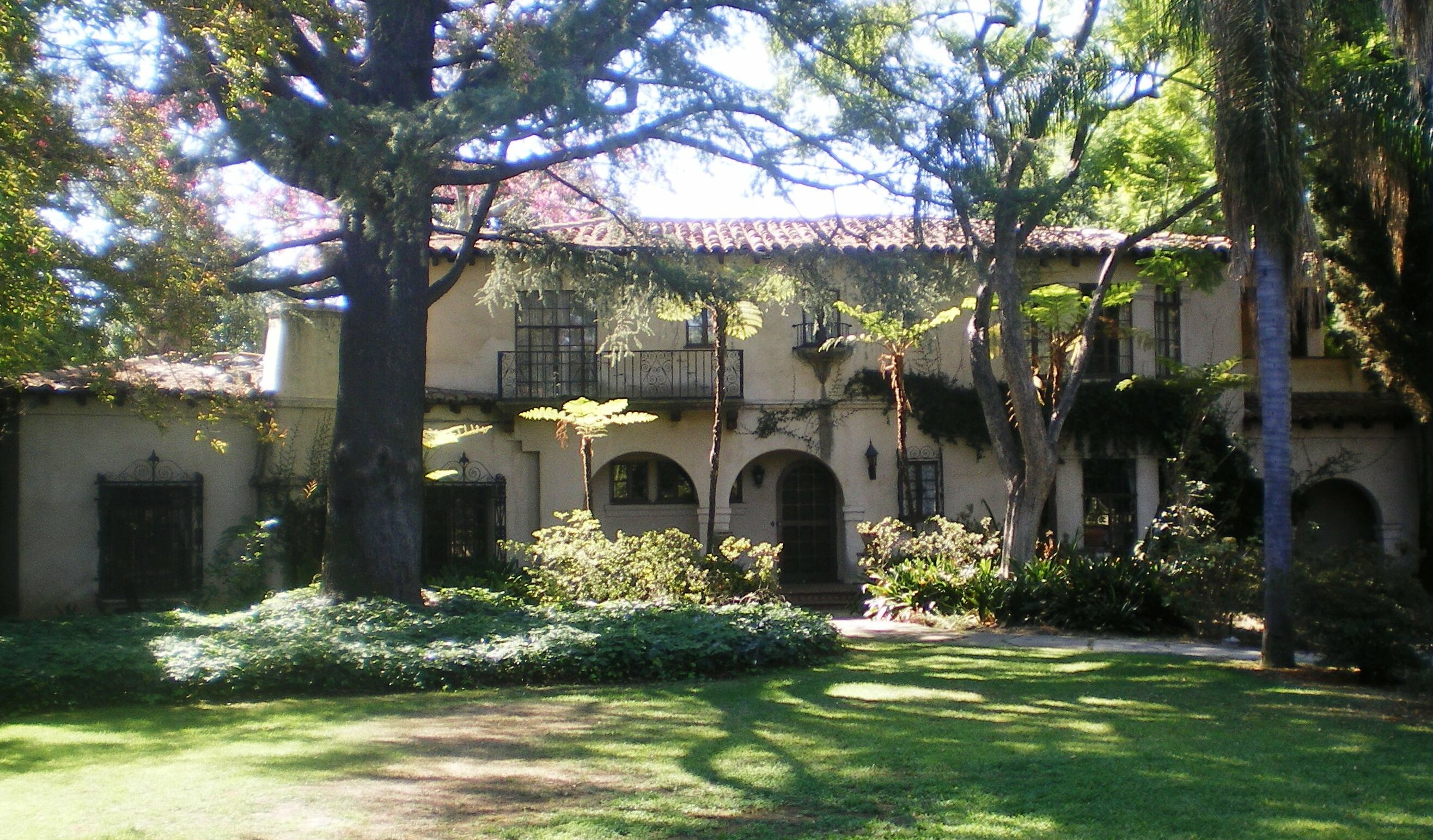
The Magnolia, a historic Mission Revival–style estate built in the 1920s

A partner of the Los Angeles Suburban Homes Company, Gen. Moses Hazeltine Sherman developed Sherman Oaks. The company had subdivided 1,000 acres (400 ha) of land that would become Sherman Oaks. In 1927, each acre was sold for $780. Sherman's other major venture was the Los Angeles Pacific Railroad.

In 1991, a group of homeowners living in the Chandler Estates area successfully petitioned former Los Angeles City Councilmember Zev Yaroslavsky to re-draw the boundaries of Sherman Oaks from Magnolia Boulevard to Burbank Boulevard in the north, and from Coldwater Canyon Avenue to Van Nuys Blvd in the west, with the goal of including their neighborhood. This request was nothing new to the San Fernando Valley; other neighborhoods had either sought to change their names, or sought to attach themselves onto more affluent neighborhoods. Residents in the area argued, however, that the area was originally part of Sherman Oaks, but was labeled Van Nuys instead through the creation of ZIP codes in 1962; a resident produced a property deed to buttress the case.

Just a few weeks after the Chandler Estates area successfully seceded from Van Nuys, Magnolia Woods, a 45 block area bordered by Van Nuys Boulevard on the east and the San Diego Freeway on the west, and between Burbank and Magnolia Boulevards, also successfully petitioned Los Angeles City council member Marvin Braude to secede from Van Nuys and join Sherman Oaks. Petitioners in the area argued that their neighborhood was also part of Sherman Oaks, though they were only able to produce 22 deeds showing so. As a result of this change, Van Nuys Middle School became separated from its namesake neighborhood.

Finally, in 2009, the Los Angeles City council voted to redraw neighborhood boundaries again to allow an area of about 1,800 homes in Van Nuys to be included.

The 1994 Northridge earthquake caused damage in the surrounding area. The Community Redevelopment Agency sought to manage the rebuilding efforts. The homeowners in the Sherman Oaks area later won a lawsuit to prevent the agency from managing efforts.

In May 2026, the In-N-Out Burger located in Sherman Oaks, was the site of an anti-Asian attack. Those attacked have sued the restaurant for not protecting the customers from the actions of other customers.

== Geography ==
The neighborhood is roughly bounded by Studio City to the east, Van Nuys to the north, Encino to the west, Bel Air and Beverly Hills Post Office to the south.

=== Climate ===
Climate data for Sherman Oaks, Los Angeles
Month	Jan	Feb	Mar	Apr	May	Jun	Jul	Aug	Sep	Oct	Nov	Dec	Year
Mean daily maximum °F (°C)	67 (19)	69 (21)	71 (22)	76 (24)	78 (26)	84 (29)	91 (33)	92 (33)	88 (31)	82 (28)	74 (23)	68 (20)	78 (26)
Mean daily minimum °F (°C)	44 (7)	45 (7)	46 (8)	48 (9)	52 (11)	56 (13)	59 (15)	60 (16)	58 (14)	53 (12)	47 (8)	43 (6)	51 (11)
Average precipitation inches (mm)	4.10 (104)	4.39 (112)	3.48 (88)	0.77 (20)	0.25 (6.4)	0.06 (1.5)	0.01 (0.25)	0.17 (4.3)	0.25 (6.4)	0.44 (11)	1.20 (30)	1.99 (51)	17.12 (435)

== Demographics ==
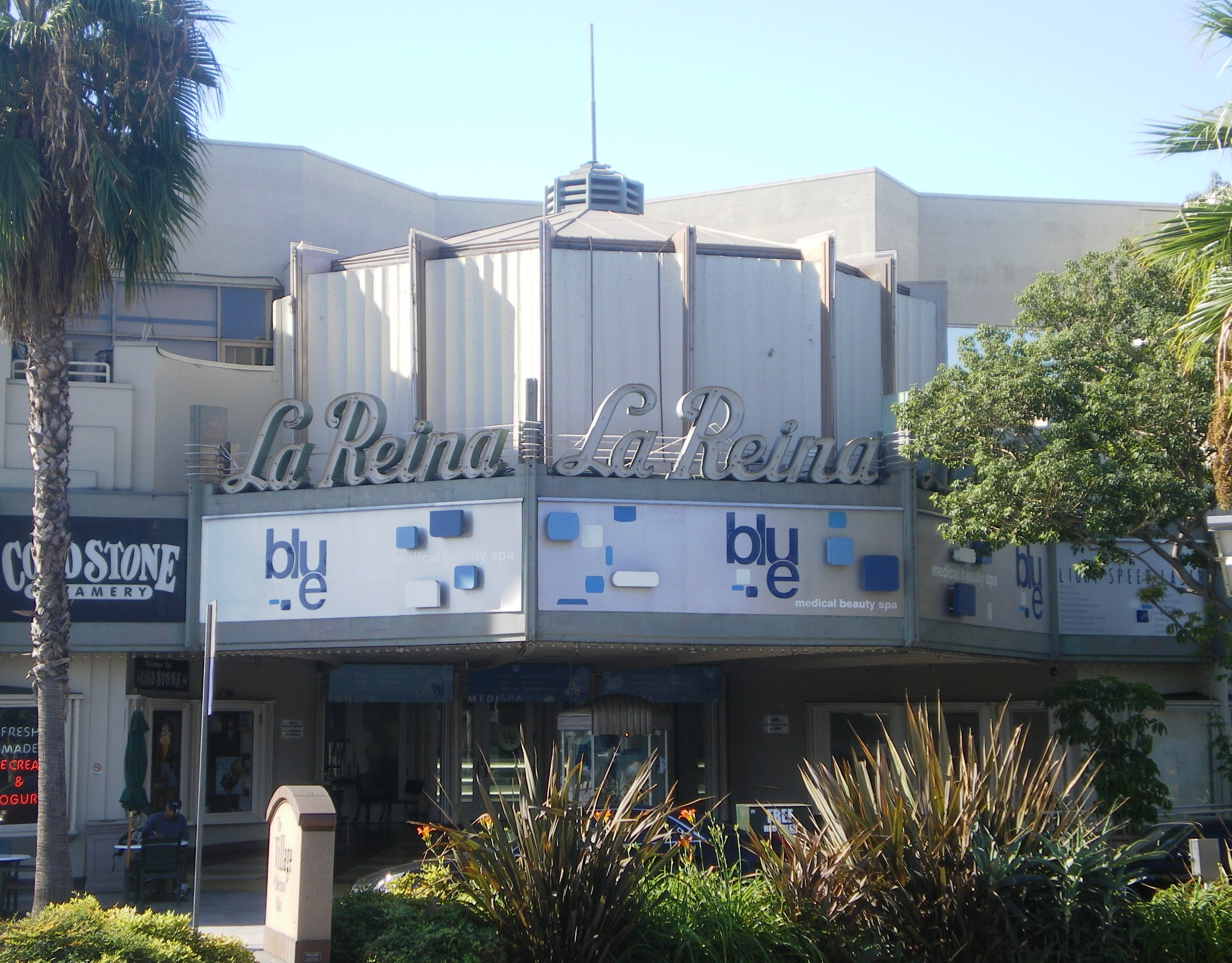
La Reina Theater, 2008

=== 2022 ===
As of 2022, according to the Los Angeles Almanac there were estimated to be 66,686 residents of Sherman Oaks. The ethnic breakdown was 64.39% White (non-Hispanic), 7.10% Asian, 5.62% Black, 0.31% Native American, 0.13% Pacific Islander, 5.06% from other races, and 11.93% from two or more races, while 16.18% were Hispanic or Latino of any race.

=== 2010 ===
As of the 2010 census, according to the San Fernando Valley Almanac, Sherman Oaks had a population of 52,677 people and 25,255 households. The racial makeup of the neighborhood was 82% non-Hispanic White, 5% Asian American and 3% African American; 11% were Hispanic or Latino of any race. Other races made up less than 1%.

=== 2000 ===
The Los Angeles Times reported that the 2000 U.S. census counted 61,166 residents in the 9.15-square-mile Sherman Oaks neighborhood, including a wide swath of the Santa Monica Mountains—or 6,687 people per square mile, among the lowest population densities for the city. In 2008, the city estimated that the resident population had increased to 65,436.

In 2000, the percentages of residents aged 19 to 49 and 65 and older were among the county's highest. The percentages of divorced residents and of widows were among the county's highest. The average household size of two people was low when compared to the rest of the city and the county. Renters occupied 58.9% of the housing stock and house- or apartment-owners held 41.1%.

The neighborhood was considered "not especially diverse" ethnically within Los Angeles, with a high percentage of white residents. The breakdown was whites, 73.8%; Latinos, 11.8%; Asians, 5.7%; blacks, 4.4%; and others, 4.4%. Russian (8.4%) and German (7.4%) were the most common ancestries. Iran (14.1%) and Mexico (8.8%) were the most common places of birth for the 26.2% of the residents who were born abroad—an average percentage for Los Angeles.

The neighborhood had a median household income of $69,651 in 2008, which was high for the city of Los Angeles but about average for the county as a whole. The percentage of households that earned $125,000 and up was high for Los Angeles County.

== Economy ==
- My Gym Children's Fitness Center, a worldwide children's fitness center has headquarters at Sherman Oaks.

== Arts and culture ==
Los Angeles Public Library operates the Sherman Oaks Branch, also known as the Sherman Oaks Martin Pollard Branch.

== Parks and recreation ==
The Van Nuys Sherman Oaks Park has a pool, auditorium, baseball diamonds, basketball courts, football field, gymnasium, and soccer field.

Sherman Oaks Castle Park features an arcade, batting cages, and miniature golf.

== Government ==
=== Local government ===
The Sherman Oaks Neighborhood Council is an official government entity of the City of Los Angeles, providing a gateway to the Los Angeles City Council in order to promote public participation in city governance and decision-making processes. Sherman Oaks lies in Los Angeles's 4th City Council district, represented as of 2025 by Nithya Raman.

=== County, state, and federal representation ===
As of 2025, Sherman Oaks lies in the Los Angeles County Board of Supervisors' Third and Fifth Districts, represented by Lindsey Horvath and Kathryn Barger, respectively. It lies in California's 44th State Assembly district, represented by Nick Schultz. Sherman Oaks is in California's 27th State Senate District, represented by Henry Stern. It is in California's 32nd congressional district, represented by Brad Sherman.

== Education ==
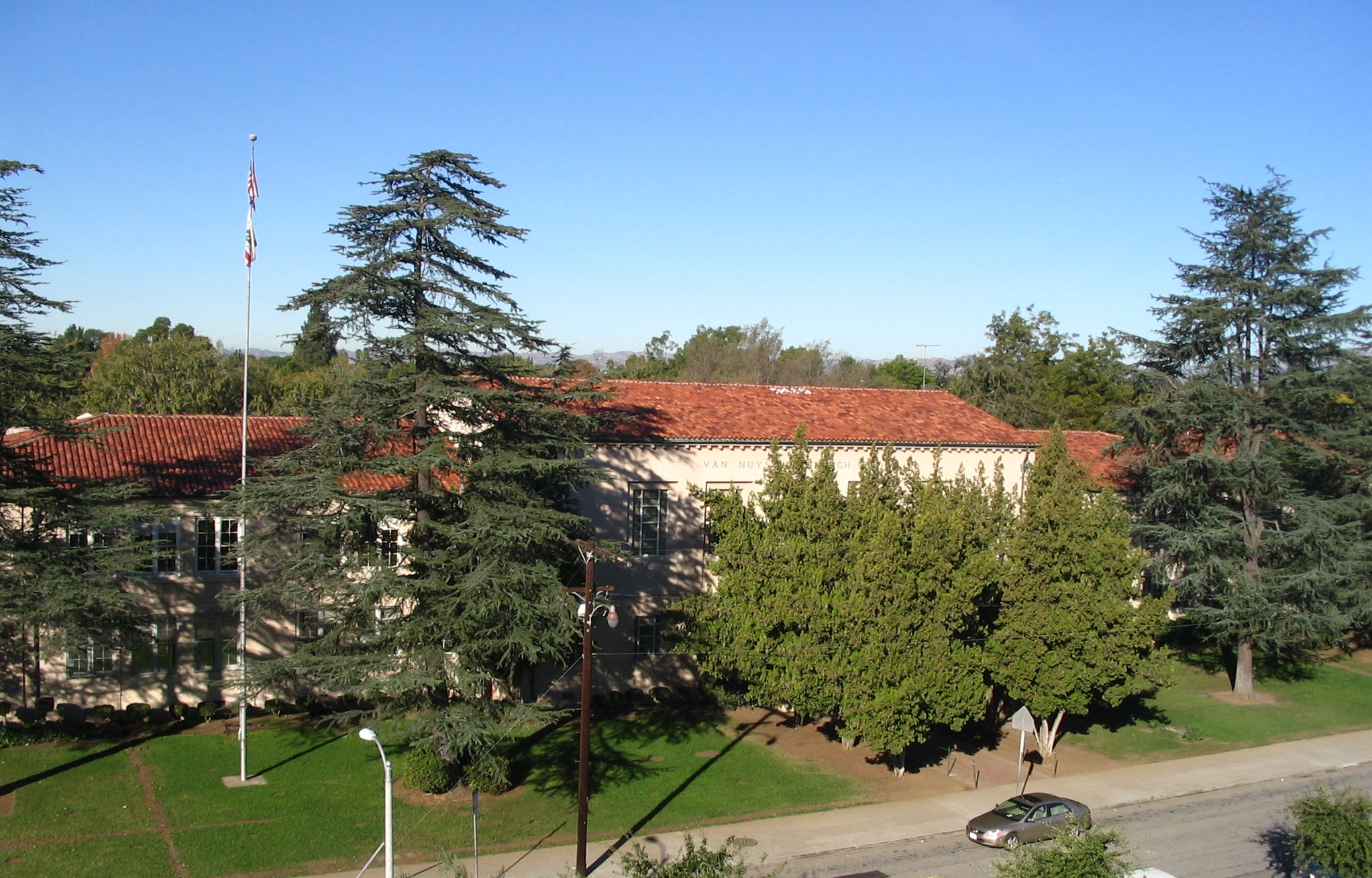
Van Nuys Middle School

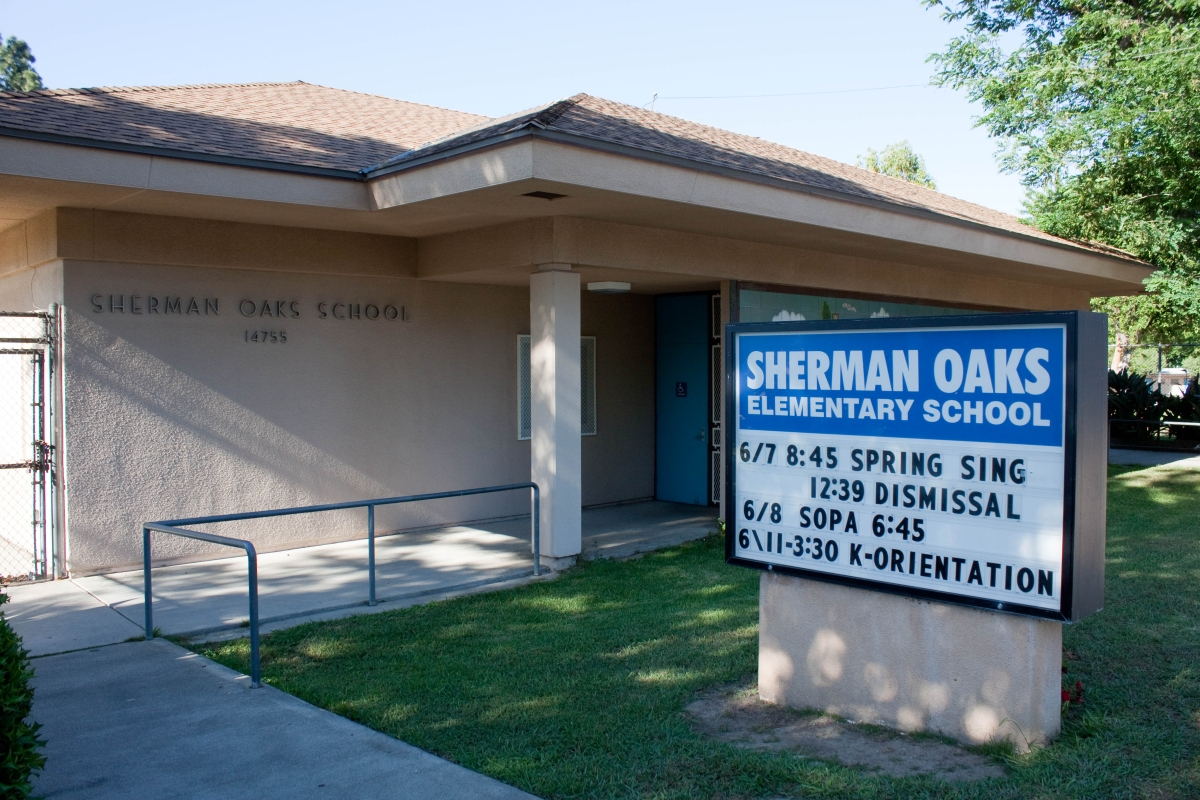
Sherman Oaks Elementary School

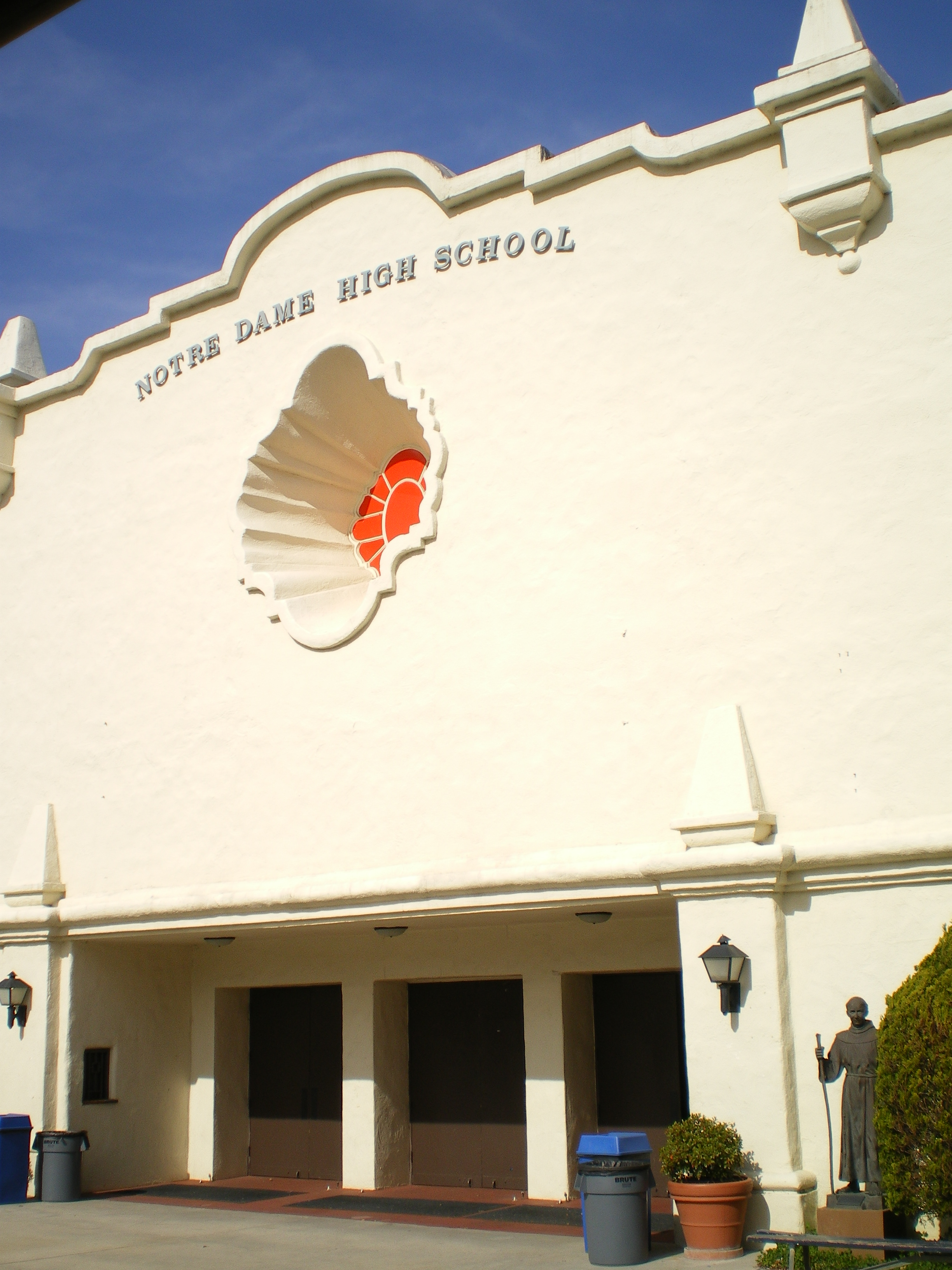
Notre Dame High School

Forty-five percent of Sherman Oaks residents aged 25 and older had earned a four-year degree by 2000, a high percentage for both the city and the county. The percentage of those residents with a master's degree or higher was also high for the County.

LAUSD schools within the Sherman Oaks boundary include:

- Van Nuys Middle School. The school was in the Van Nuys community until 1991, when City Council member Marvin Braude directed that a 45-block area that included the school be renamed as part of Sherman Oaks. The school continued to use the name "Van Nuys Middle".
- Kester Avenue Elementary School
- Chandler Elementary School
- Louis Armstrong Middle School
- Sherman Oaks Elementary
- Dixie Canyon Avenue Elementary
- Riverside Drive Elementary School

Charter schools within the Sherman Oaks boundary include:

- Ivy Bound Academy for Math, Science, and Technology on Morrison Street
- Community Harvest Charter School, closed in 2012

Portions of Sherman Oaks, including Magnolia Woods, are zoned to Van Nuys High School in Van Nuys. Other portions are zoned to Grant High School in Valley Glen.

Private schools include:

- Notre Dame High School
- The Buckley School
- Village Glen School

== Infrastructure ==
Public safety is provided by the Los Angeles Fire Department and Los Angeles Police Department.

== Los Angeles River ==
The Los Angeles River runs along the northern edge, forming part of the boundary with Van Nuys. In this area, the river is primarily a concrete lined flood control channel, though nearby sections of the Sepulveda Basin include more natural features. Portions of the river's edge are accessible via Ernie's Walk and the Los Angeles River bicycle path, providing limited access along the channel.

== Notable people ==
- Paula Abdul, entertainer, singer, television personality
- Baba Ali, comedian
- Jennifer Aniston, actress, born in Sherman Oaks
- Pete Crow-Armstrong, baseball player
- Drew Barrymore, actress
- LeVar Burton, actor
- June Christy, singer
- Andrew Dice Clay, comedian and actor
- Michael Costello, fashion designer
- Kaley Cuoco, actress
- James Dean, actor
- David Dobrik, YouTube personality
- Clint Eastwood, actor, film director
- Samantha Eggar (1939–2025), British actress
- Harlan Ellison (died 2018), writer
- Michael Erush (born 1984), soccer player and coach
- Charles Esten, actor
- Mel Gibson, actor
- Joseph Gordon-Levitt, actor and filmmaker
- Ben Gottschalk (born 1992), NFL football offensive linesman
- Brian Grazer, film and television producer
- Melissa Joan Hart, actress
- Natasha Henstridge, actress
- Ne-Yo, singer
- Marsha Hunt (1917–2022), actress, model, and activist
- Jenn Im, YouTube personality
- Juicy J, rapper
- Duncan Jones, director
- Michael B. Jordan, actor
- Shia LaBeouf, actor
- Sondra Locke (1944–2018), actress, film director
- Demi Lovato, singer, songwriter, and actress
- Jeannie Mai, television personality, stylist, talk show host
- Rami Malek, actor
- Jenna Marbles, YouTube personality
- Natalie Martinez, actress
- Bridget Marquardt, actress
- Christopher Mayer, actor
- Duff McKagan, musician
- Tana Mongeau, YouTube personality
- C. Timothy O'Meara, film editor
- Mary-Kate and Ashley Olsen, Elizabeth Olsen, actresses
- Bill Paparian, mayor of Pasadena, California
- Luke Perry (1966–2019), actor
- Pink, singer
- Annie Potts, actress
- Yasiel Puig, baseball player
- Chuck Riley, voice actor
- Jean Rogers, actor
- Herbert Ryman, Disney artist and imagineer
- Charlie Sheen, actor
- Brad Sherman, U.S. congressman
- Warren Stevens, actor
- Bella Thorne, actress
- Ryan Turell (born 1999), basketball player in the Israeli Basketball Premier League, Yeshiva University
- Marlon Wayans, actor and comedian
- Jaiden Animations (born 1997), YouTuber and animator
- Alpharad (born 1995), YouTuber, esports personality, and musician

== In popular culture ==
The TV series Sherman Oaks appeared on Showtime from 1995 to 1997.

The series Never Have I Ever is set in Sherman Oaks.

The series Black-ish is set in Sherman Oaks.

In The Simpsons Treehouse of Horror VI, Homer lands in the real world, wandering around. The scene was filmed on Ventura Boulevard, in Sherman Oaks.
