= Post-acute infection syndrome =

Symptoms after infections

- Other names: Post-viral syndrome, post-infectious syndrome, infection-associated chronic condition
- Symptoms: Post-exertional malaise, fatigue, flu-like symptoms, pain, neurocognitive problems

Post-acute infection syndromes (PAISs) or infection-associated chronic conditions (IACCs) are medical conditions characterized by symptoms attributed to a prior infection. While it is commonly assumed that people either recover or die from infections, long-term symptoms—or sequelae—are a possible outcome as well. Examples include long COVID (post-acute sequelae of SARS-CoV-2 infection, PASC), myalgic encephalomyelitis/chronic fatigue syndrome (ME/CFS), and post-Ebola virus syndrome. Common symptoms include post-exertional malaise (PEM), severe fatigue, neurocognitive symptoms, unrefreshing sleep, flu-like symptoms, and pain. The pathology of most of these conditions is not fully understood, and management is generally symptomatic.

== Signs and symptoms ==
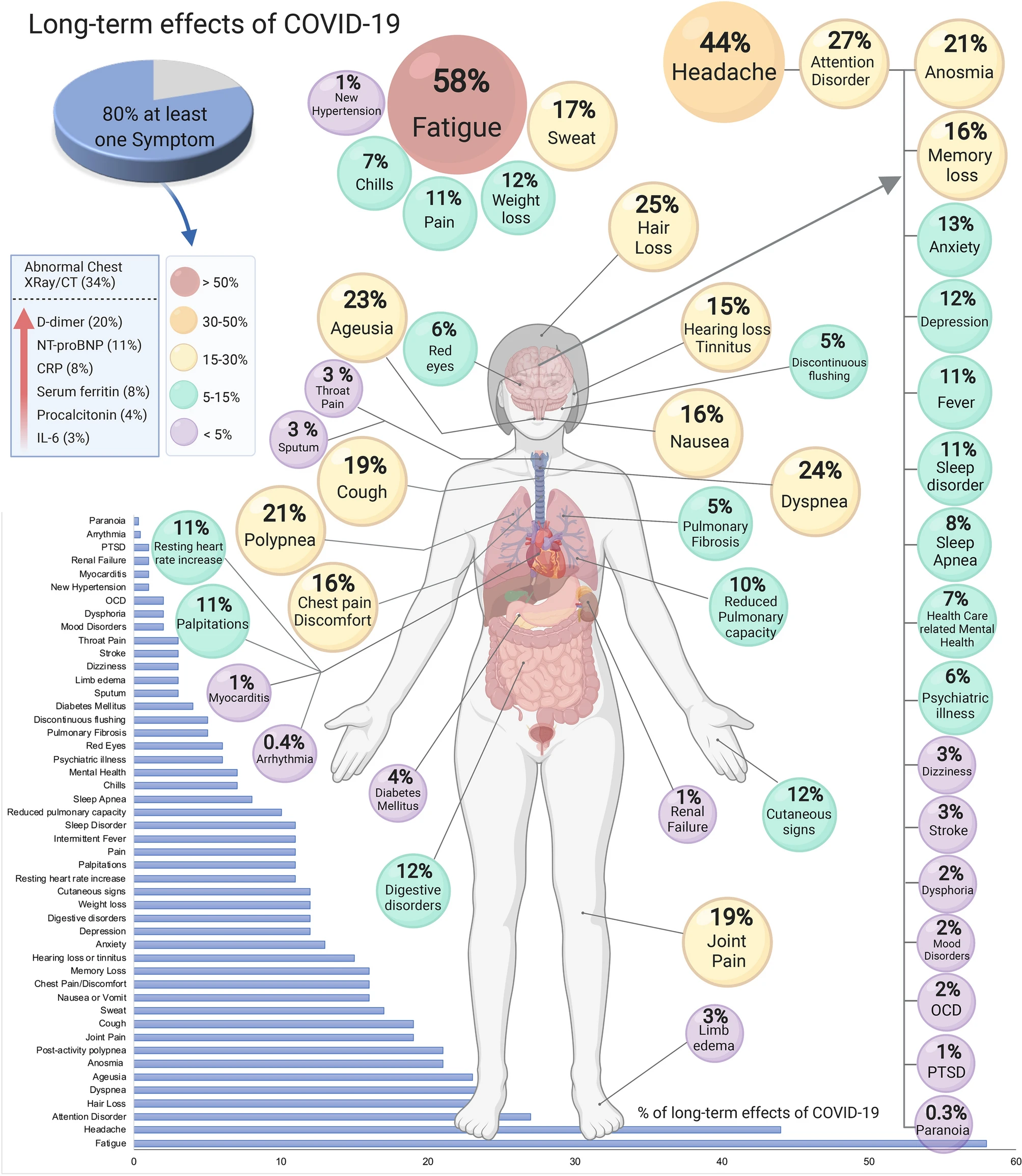
Chart showing symptoms of long COVID

PAIS symptoms are often similar despite diverse prior infections. Symptoms commonly included in definitions of PAIS include post-exertional malaise, severe fatigue, neurocognitive and sensory symptoms, flu-like symptoms, unrefreshing sleep, muscle pain, and joint pain. Symptoms can vary among affected people. Some PAIS symptoms are more specific. For example, eye problems are common in post-Ebola virus syndrome, and profound weakness is seen in post-polio syndrome and post-West Nile fevers.

Symptoms can be severe and debilitating, resulting in lowered quality of life or inability to work. The onset of symptoms may be delayed, often by decades in the case of post-polio syndrome, and their severity may fluctuate over time.

== Causes ==
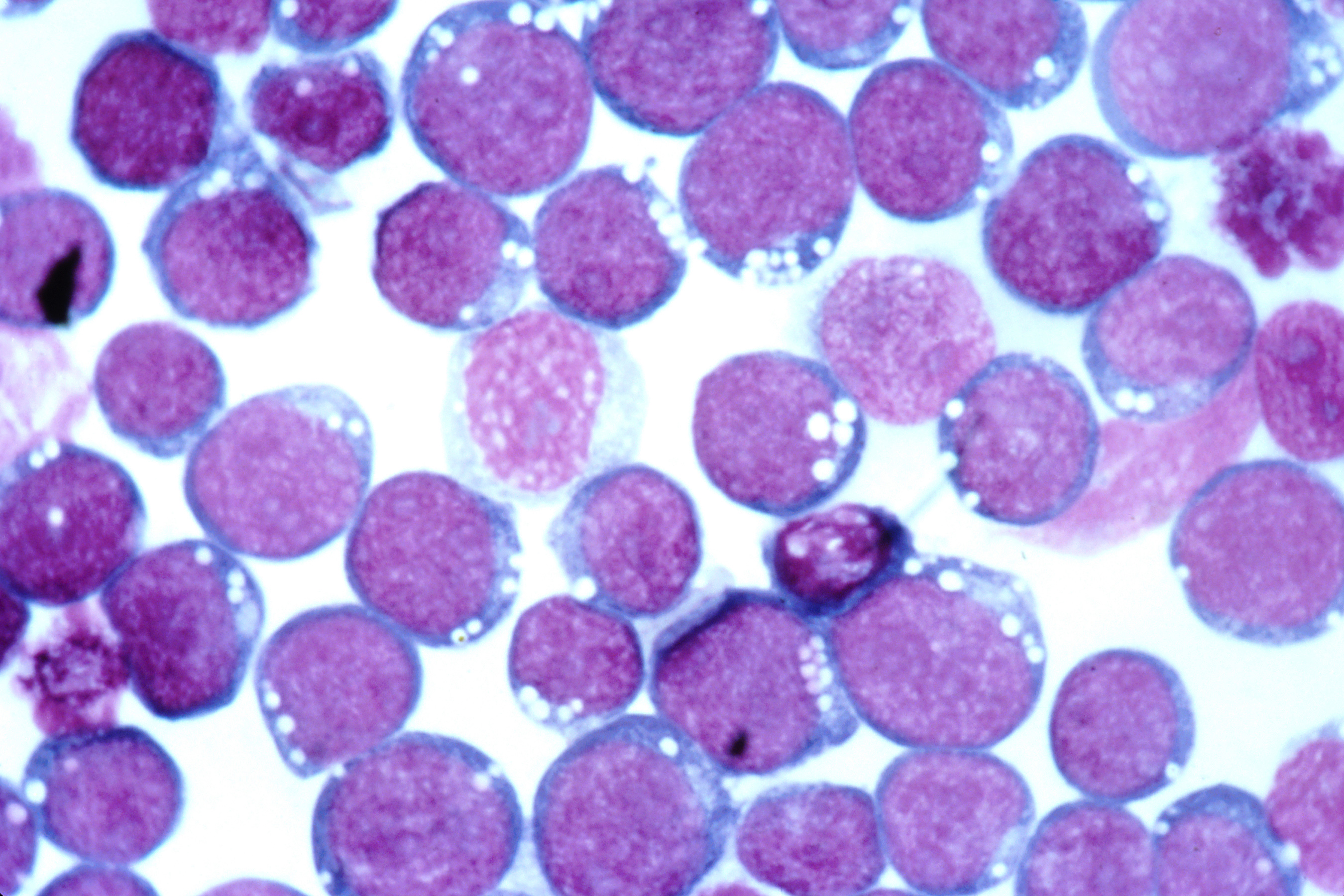
Cells infected with Epstein–Barr virus, one of the viruses implicated in PAISs

Pathogens associated with PAISs include SARS-CoV-2 (causing COVID-19), Ebolavirus, Dengue virus, poliovirus, SARS-CoV-1 (causing SARS), Chikungunya virus, Epstein–Barr virus (EBV), West Nile virus (WNV), Ross River virus (RRV), Coxsackie B, influenza A virus subtype H1N1, varicella zoster virus (VZV), Coxiella burnetii, Borrelia, and Giardia. However, the strength of evidence associating these pathogens with chronic illness varies.

The pathophysiology of most PAISs is poorly understood, but the overlap in symptoms despite disparate infectious triggers implies a possible shared pathology. For most conditions, no chronic infection has been detected.

== Mechanism ==
The pathology of post-acute infections syndromes is not fully understood. The commonality in symptoms between illnesses may point to a common pathology. Major hypotheses include persistence of the original pathogen or its remnants, autoimmunity, chronic inflammation, reactivation of other latent infections, microbiome dysbiosis, or damage to organs, which may include the lungs, brain, kidneys, heart, or blood vessels.

== Diagnosis ==
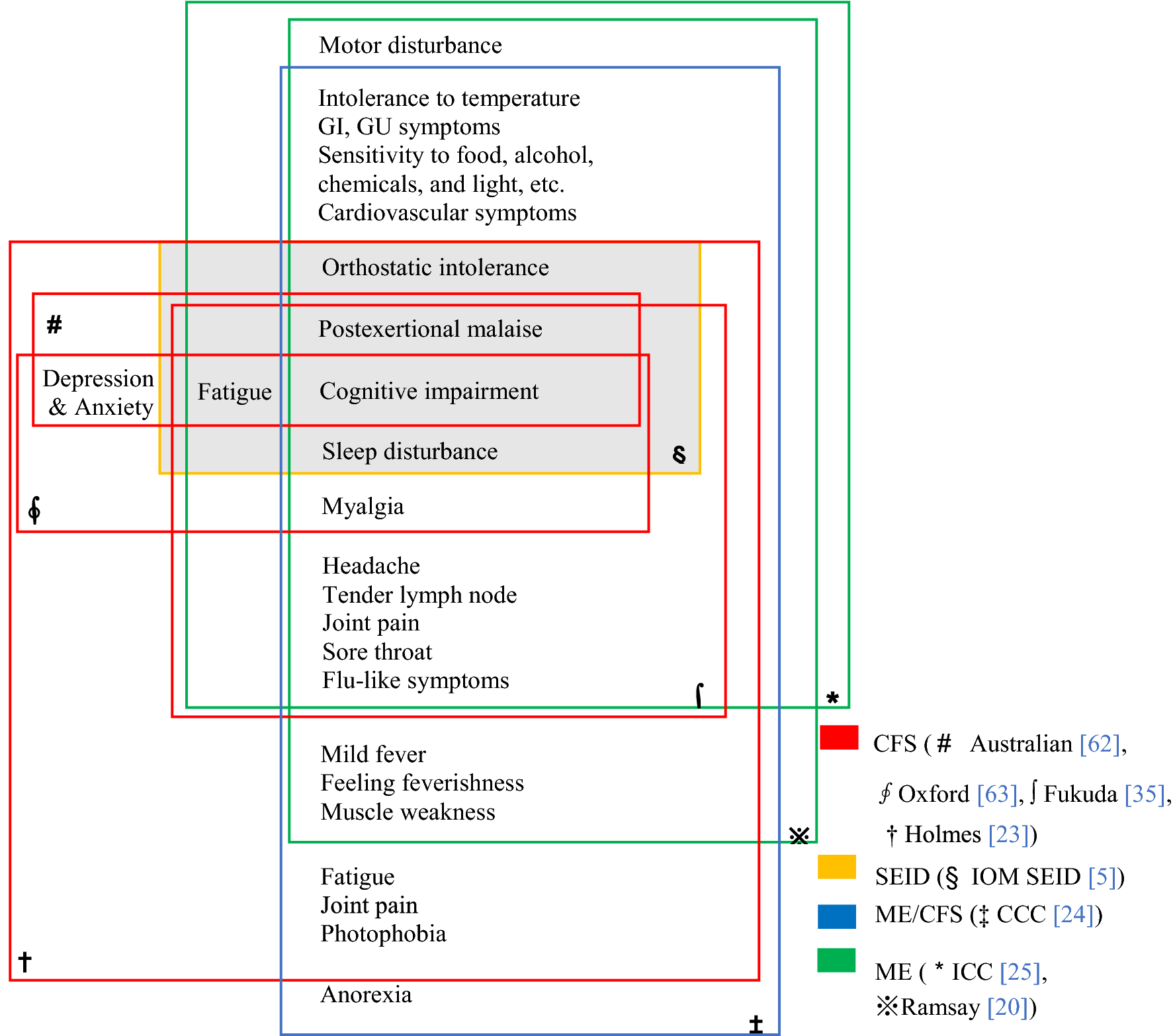
ME/CFS has many competing definitions.

In the absence of tests for most PAISes, diagnosis is usually based on the patient's history, symptoms, and eliminating other potential causes. Available tests often fail to explain patients' symptoms, but this does not suggest they are not real. The complexity of diagnosing PAISes may lead to long delays in diagnosis.

Diagnostic criteria vary among illnesses, and have at times been the subject of intense debate. For example, several definitions of ME/CFS have been in use.

=== Classification ===
PAIS is a broad term describing conditions attributed to various infections, including long COVID, ME/CFS, post-Ebola virus syndrome, post-dengue fatigue syndrome, post-polio syndrome, post-SARS syndrome, post-chikungunya disease, Q fever fatigue syndrome, post-treatment Lyme disease syndrome (PTLDS), and symptoms observed after other infections lacking a specific name. Other known sequelae of infections include multisystem inflammatory syndrome in children (MIS-C), and subacute sclerosing panencephalitis (a deadly consequence of measles that can be delayed by years).

== Management ==
Treatment options for most PAISes are limited. In general, the focus is on managing symptoms, and management strategies for ME/CFS may benefit patients with similar symptoms.

== Prognosis ==
Some people with PAISs recover over a period ranging from weeks to years while others remain ill. Many studies have shown that symptoms can continue for at least several years until the studies' conclusion. Studies of PTLDS ran longer and found increased rates of symptoms for up to 27 years. In the case of ME/CFS prognosis is poor and the illness is lifelong for most.

== Epidemiology ==
Data on epidemiology is limited by the lack of large, rigorous studies; and rates vary by infection. Mononucleosis is among the best studied, and available studies found that 7–9% had persistent symptoms 12 months after infection, and 4% had serious symptoms after 2 years. The British Office of National Statistics data on long COVID say that about 10% of people who had COVID-19 self-reported long COVID 6 months after infection, and about 7% reported long COVID with activity limitations. An Australian study of EBV, C. burnetii, and Ross River Virus found that 11% of participants met the criteria for ME/CFS at 6 months. Around 10–20% of people with SARS also experienced long-term effects.

== History ==
While PAISs were described prior to the COVID-19 pandemic, the emergence of long COVID brought them increased attention.

== Society and culture ==
PAISs cause a significant disease burden, but have received relatively little attention from scientists, potentially delaying the discovery of causes, diagnostic tests, and treatments. Infectious disease surveillance programs track acute illness but rarely track the health effects of PAIS. Many doctors are also unfamiliar with them, and may fail to take symptoms seriously.

== Research ==
PAISs may have a common cause, and different hypotheses are being studied. Long COVID has increased the overall pace of research.

== See also ==
- Postural orthostatic tachycardia syndrome, sometimes attributed to an infection
