= Post-Ebola virus syndrome =

Sequelae following recovery from Ebola virus disease

- Other names: Post-Ebola syndrome
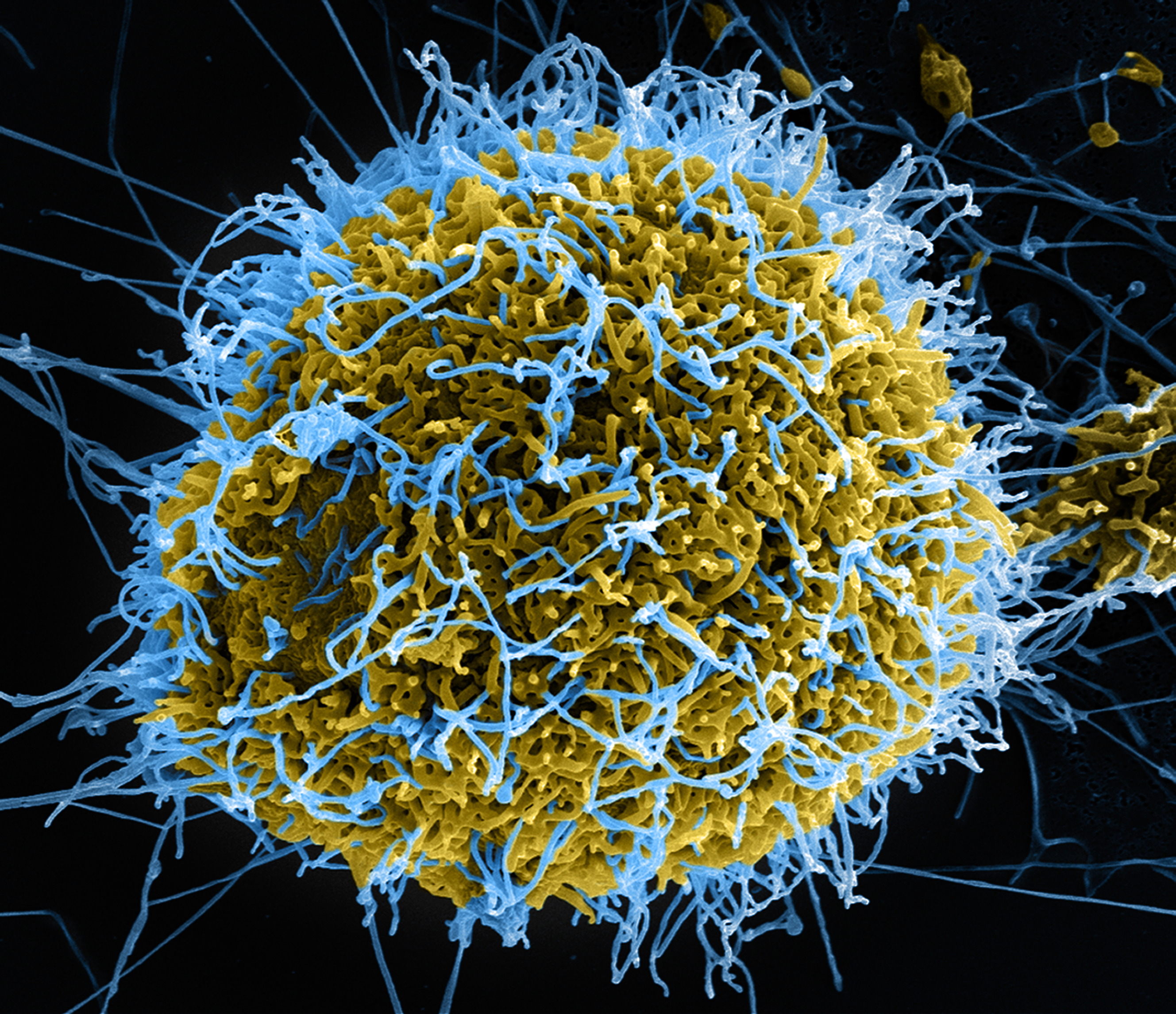
- Ebola virus particles (blue) attacking a cell (yellow)
- Specialty: Infectious disease
- Symptoms: Chest pain, fatigue, hearing loss
- Causes: Ebola infection
- Diagnostic method: Neurological observation

Post-Ebola virus syndrome (or post-Ebola syndrome) is a post-viral syndrome affecting those who have recovered from infection with Ebola. Symptoms include joint and muscle pain, eye problems, including blindness, various neurological problems, and other ailments, sometimes so severe that the person is unable to work. Although similar symptoms had been reported following previous outbreaks in the last 20 years, health professionals began using the term in 2014 when referring to a constellation of symptoms seen in people who had recovered from an acute attack of Ebola virus disease.

== Signs and symptoms ==
Researchers have been aware of a group of symptoms that frequently followed Ebola virus disease for 20 years, but it became more widely reported with the large number of survivors of the deadly epidemic in West Africa in 2014. Post Ebola syndrome may manifest as joint pain, muscle pain, chest pain, fatigue, hearing loss, hair loss, cessation of menstruation, and poor long-term health. Some survivors report neurological issues including memory problems and anxiety attacks. Vision loss is also frequently reported, along with eye pain, inflammation, and blurred vision. Two papers published in the New England Journal of Medicine in 2015 report that symptoms include lethargy, joint pains, hair loss, and vision loss, frequently to the point of near blindness, and uveitis.

== Mechanism ==
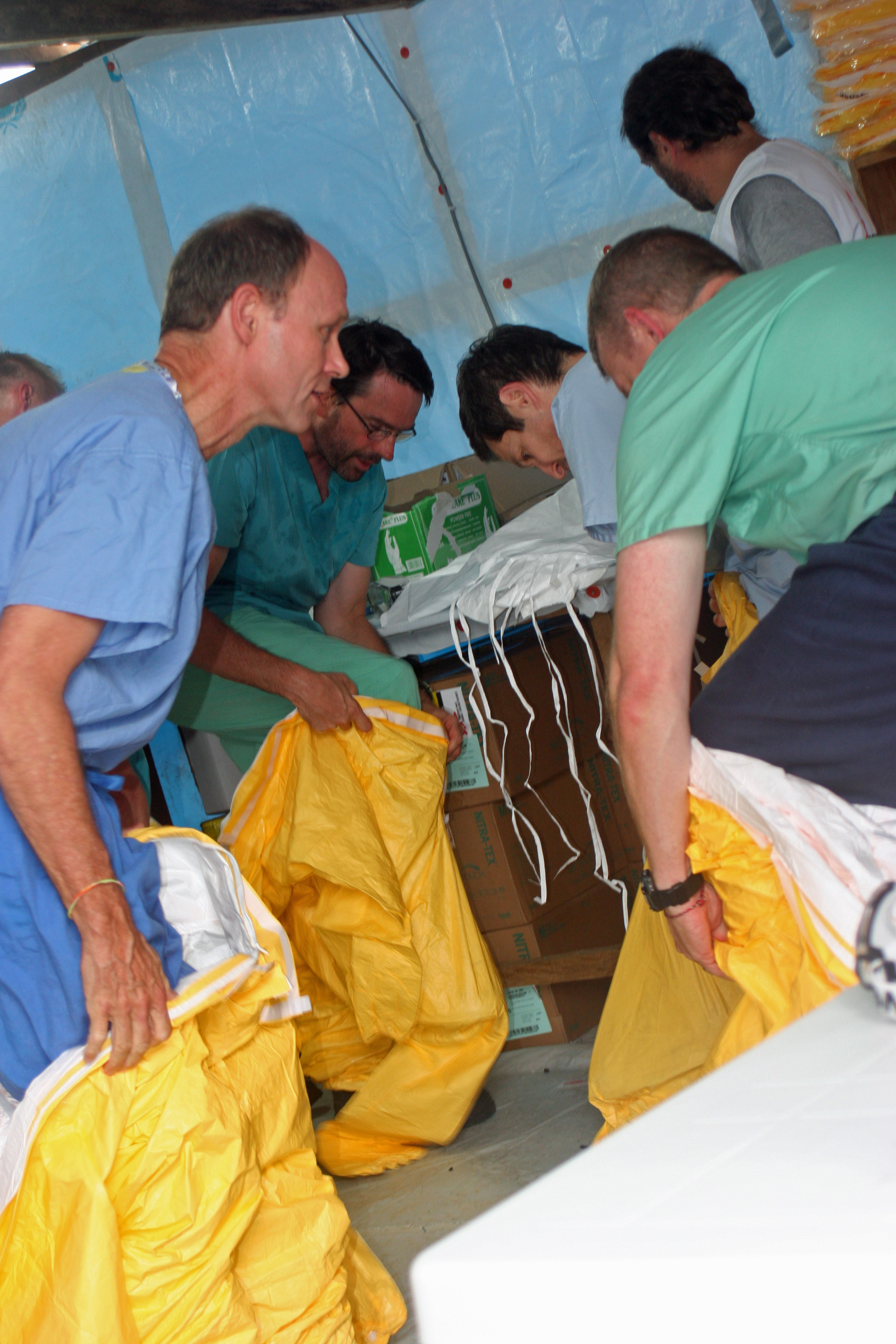
Doctors put on protective gear before entering an Ebola treatment ward in Liberia, August 2014.

Although, there is some progress that may potentially help Ebola survivors, adequate funding and further research is required to help provide more answers about post-Ebola syndrome.

Studies from previous outbreaks reveal that the virus is able to survive for months after recovery in some parts of the body such as the eyes and testes, where the immune system cannot reach. It is not known if the neurologic symptoms seen in survivors are a direct result of the virus or, instead, triggered by the immune system's response to the infection. It is known that Ebola can trigger a massive cytokine storm that can cause bleeding throughout the body, including the brain, which may explain various neurological symptoms that have been reported.

== Diagnosis ==
In terms of diagnosis, the individual may show sensitivity to light or eye redness when ocular problems are suspected. Neurologically the individual's coordination, gait and frontal release signs should be observed.

== Management ==
Management depends on the symptoms displayed, for example, if the individual indicates muscular-skeletal pain then paracetamol may be administered. If the individual presents with ocular problems, then prednisone and cyclopentolate may be used for treatment, according to the WHO.

== Prognosis ==
=== Viral persistence and transmission ===
According to a review by Brainard, et al., Ebola virus was identified in almost 3 out of 4 seminal fluid samples (18 survivors) almost 4 months after initial infection, with the last positive samples being more than 6 months (203 days) after infection had occurred. Another aspect of survivors of the Ebola virus, is that it could become sexually transmitted, as the virus is present in semen nine months after the individuals are declared free of Ebola. A 2017 study found the virus in the semen of some men after more than two years following the recovery from the acute infection and in one case, Ebola viral RNA was identified up to 40 months after illness.

At the start of 2021 an outbreak of EVD that caused 18 cases and 9 deaths in Guinea is thought to be due to a West Africa Ebola outbreak survivor. This individual apparently infected a woman more than 5 years after he himself had incurred the infection

== Research ==
An observational study, done roughly 29 months after the 2007 Bundibugyo outbreak in Uganda, found that long-term sequelae (i.e. consequences) persisted among survivors. Symptoms included eye pain, blurred vision, hearing loss, difficulty swallowing, difficulty sleeping, arthralgias, memory loss or confusion, and "various constitutional symptoms controlling for age and sex".

From August through December 2014, a total of 10 patients with Ebola were treated in US hospitals; of these patients, 8 survived. In March 2015, the CDC interviewed the survivors; they all reported having had at least one adverse symptom during their recovery period. The symptoms ranged from mild (e.g. hair loss) to more severe complications requiring re-hospitalisation or treatment. The most frequently reported symptoms were lethargy or fatigue, joint pain, and hair loss. Sixty-three per cent reported having eye problems including two who were diagnosed with uveitis, 75% reported psychological or cognitive symptoms, and 38% reported neural difficulties. Although most symptoms resolved or improved over time, only one survivor reported complete resolution of all symptoms.

A study published in May 2015 discussed the case of Ian Crozier, a Zimbabwe-born physician and American citizen who became infected with Ebola while he was working at an Ebola treatment centre in Sierra Leone. He was transported to the US and successfully treated at Emory University Hospital. However, after discharge Crozier began to experience symptoms including low back pain, bilateral enthesitis of the Achilles tendon, paresthesias involving his lower legs, and eye pain, which was diagnosed as uveitis. His eye condition worsened and a specimen of aqueous humor obtained from his eye tested positive for Ebola. The authors of the study concluded that "further studies to investigate the mechanisms responsible for the ocular persistence of Ebola and the possible presence of the virus in other immune-privileged sites (e.g., in the central nervous system, gonads, and articular cartilage) are warranted." The authors also noted that 40% of participants in a survey of 85 Ebola survivors in Sierra Leone reported having "eye problems", though the incidence of actual uveitis was unknown.

Another study, which was released in August 2015 looked at the health difficulties reported by survivors. Calling the set of symptoms "post-Ebolavirus disease syndrome", the research found symptoms that included "chronic joint and muscle pain, fatigue, anorexia, hearing loss, blurred vision, headache, sleep disturbances, low mood and short-term memory problems", and suggested the "implementation of specialised health services to treat and follow-up survivors".

Researchers from the National Institute of Neurological Disorders and Stroke (NINDS) and Liberian research partners are doing a 5-year follow-up study of 1500 Ebola survivors in Liberia. Survivors will be evaluated every 6 months; as of October 2017, two follow-ups have been performed. Researchers will track relapses and viral persistence, characterize sequelae in various bodily systems, and do clinical studies on pharmacologic interventions and vaccines.

PREVAIL III (Partnership for Research on Ebola Vaccines in Liberia III), a study of survivors and their contacts, a collaboration between NIAID and Liberia, was planned in late 2014. Early results described abdominal, chest, neurologic, musculoskeletal, and ocular challenges faced by survivors.

PREVAIL IV examined if a medication, GS-5734, could help men with persistent Ebola virus RNA in semen to eliminate it, and thereby reduce the potential risk for sexual transmission.

PREVAIL VII examined if survivors of Ebola virus disease had evidence of Ebola virus RNA in aqueous humor and outcomes of cataract surgery relative to the local population.

In 2018, over two years after the resolution of the Ebola outbreak in Eastern Sierra Leone, a study was conducted of Ebola survivors, with their families used as a control group. The study was published in 2021, Looking at the results, the researchers were able to find an underlying process leading to persistent symptoms in some but not all Ebola survivors. One hypothesis suggests "ongoing inflammation due to persistent infection vs autoimmune phenomena." The authors suggest that more study is needed to come to conclusions about why some survivors continue to experience post syndrome ailments.

An estimated 17 000 people survived the 2014-2016 Ebola virus disease outbreak in West Africa, more than 10 times higher than the numbers of survivors in the previous outbreaks combined. Report from observational cohort study of EVD (Ebola Virus Disease) survivors in Liberia,Guinea,Sierra Leone and earlier outbreaks in Central Africa shows that constellation of musculoskeletal ,neurological,auditory and visual complications along with general fatigue are mostly reported from survivors.

In a research carried out by surveying 105 Ebola virus disease survivors discharged from Ebola treatment facility in Guinea shows that Anorexia was reported by survivors at varying levels. Arthralgia also was reported by some survivors accompanied by chest pain and back pain

== See also ==
- Ebola virus epidemic in West Africa
- List of Ebola outbreaks
- Long COVID – Long-term complication of COVID-19
