= Office of Long COVID Research and Practice =

The Office of Long COVID Research and Practice (OLC) is a government office housed within the U.S. Department of Health and Human Services (HHS) that was formed to coordinate research into Long COVID and support for affected individuals. Created in 2023, the office serves under the leadership of Rachel Levine, the Assistant Secretary for Health, and works alongside 14 government agencies currently conducting research into Long COVID.

== Background and organization ==
In 2023, the National Institutes of Health (NIH) established the RECOVER Initiative to initiate research into Long COVID. The OLC was established in 2023 with funding for only two full-time employees. In July 2023, it was reported that the OLC would hire contractors and be staffed with employees from other HHS offices. Following its creation, Secretary of Health and Human Services Xavier Becerra remarked that its "solidifies this issue [of Long COVID] as an ongoing priority" of the Biden administration.

== See also ==
- RECOVER Initiative
- COVID-19 pandemic in the United States
