= Ziyad Al-Aly =

American clinical epidemiologist

Ziyad Al-Aly is an American physician and clinical epidemiologist who is currently Director of the Clinical Epidemiology Center and Chief of the Research and Development at the Veterans Affairs St. Louis Health Care System. He is also a clinical epidemiologist at Washington University in St. Louis. He has led multiple studies on Long COVID and its sequelae.

== Early life ==
Al-Aly was born in Tripoli, Lebanon to teachers. He grew up during the Lebanese civil war which dominated Lebanon from 1975 to 1990, emigrating to the United States in 2000.

== Education ==
Al-Aly holds a medical degree from the American University of Beirut. He completed his post-graduate medical education at Saint Louis University and Washington University School of Medicine.

== Career ==
Al-Aly's research work has been cited more than a 200,000 times and he has an h-index of more than 110 according to Google Scholar. Al-Aly was featured on Clarivate (Web of Science) list of highly cited researchers in 2024 and 2025; the list recognizes researchers with significant influence, top 1% cited papers, and broad community recognition.

=== Long COVID research ===
Al-Aly led work which provided the first systematic characterization of the post-acute sequelae of SARS-CoV-2 infection. He subsequently led work which characterized the increased risks of cardiovascular disease, neurologic disorders, mental health disorders, gastrointestinal disorders, diabetes, dyslipidemia, and kidney disease following SARS-CoV-2 infection. His lab also produced evidence characterizing the effects of COVID-19 vaccines on long COVID and the health consequences of repeated infections with SARS-CoV-2.

In 2024, Al-Aly testified before the U.S. Senate Health, Education, Labor and Pensions Committee as an expert witness on Long Covid. He called for the establishment of an NIH institute to address Long Covid and Infection-Associated Chronic Conditions and Illnesses (IACCIs) — also called post-acute infection syndromes — with a funding of at least $1 billion per year.

=== Pharmacoepidemiology ===
Including work mapping the effectiveness and risks of GLP-1 drugs against 175 health outcomes and their potential effectiveness in addiction. His work also includes characterizing the adverse health effect of proton pump inhibitors and comparative effectiveness of various antihyperglycemic medications. His work also included examining the effectiveness of COVID-19 antivirals including paxlovid (nirmatrelvir/ritonavir) and molnupiravir on acute COVID-19 outcomes and long COVID.

=== Environmental epidemiology research ===
Including work which evaluated the effect of air pollution on kidney health, diabetes, obesity, and early mortality.

== Honors and awards ==
In 2023, Al-Aly was awarded the U.S. Department of Veterans Affairs Secretary's Award — the highest VA award — for outstanding contributions to research. He was named one of the 100 most influential people in health in 2024 by TIME100 Health. Al-Aly was recognized with the HealthCentral’s 2024 Chronic Health Innovator Award for his research and advocacy that led to the recognition of Long Covid as a chronic disease. He was listed on the 2024 Fierce 50 — an annual list that recognizes people driving major advancements in medicine and shaping the future of healthcare.
