= Office of Disease Prevention and Health Promotion =

Agency overview
- Formed: 1976; 50 years ago
- Parent department: United States Department of Health and Human Services (Office of the Assistant Secretary for Health)
- Website: health.gov

The Office of Disease Prevention and Health Promotion (ODPHP) is a division of the United States Department of Health and Human Services (HHS) responsible for coordinating national efforts to improve public health through disease prevention and health promotion. Established in 1976, the office develops and manages initiatives such as the Dietary Guidelines for Americans, providing evidence-based resources and tools to support health policy, education, and practice. The President's Council on Sports, Fitness, and Nutrition is a federal advisory committee within it.

== See also ==
- USDA FNS Center for Nutrition Policy and Promotion
