= The President's Challenge =

Sports award

The President's Challenge (also called Presidential Champions) was an American program promulgated by the President's Council on Fitness, Sports and Nutrition that aimed to encourage all Americans to "make being active part of their everyday lives" and to be physically fit. The President's Challenge was introduced by Lyndon B. Johnson in 1966. It was designed to help motivate participants (international participants also eligible) to improve regardless of activity and fitness level. The Presidential Champions program was discontinued on June 30, 2018.

== Program content ==
The President's Challenge program included Awards for actively performing members in their preferred games, sports, or athletics. There were various levels of Awards available. They are:

- Presidential Active Lifestyle Award (PALA)
- Health Fitness Award
- Presidential Champions Awards
  - Presidential Champions Bronze Award
  - Presidential Champions Silver Award
  - Presidential Champions Gold Award
  - Presidential Champions Platinum Award

To obtain credit participants had to log in their daily efforts, which could include both sports and physical fitness activities. Each daily activity gave a certain number of points, the number computed by both its intensity and duration. Reporting was entirely on the honor system. Each higher level award required accumulating more points. There was no time limit. Qualifiers were eligible for certificates, medals and patches, with the platinum award being a large medallion.

Participants who achieved the Platinum Award were also offered participation in the Presidential Champions Platinum Award program. The Platinum Awards page was taken down in 2016 following the transition of the program from being under the administration of FDA to the Department on Agriculture on August 31, 2016. SuperTracker and the new management did not track Platinum earners or post any information about them, and the program was suspended in 2018.

== Website hacked ==
On January 11, 2012, the operators of the website for participants of the Challenge and Active Lifestyle programs learned that the website had been hacked resulting in the release of personal information of the participants.

On January 27, 2012, The President's Challenge sent out emails to its participants saying that the website was functional as of January 24, 2012, and asked participants to reset their user passwords.

== Discontinuation ==
The Trump administration terminated the program on June 30, 2018. The reason stated was that the private sector created many other tools that have the same purpose, so it was discontinued to invest in newer ways to help Americans have a healthy lifestyle.

== See also ==
- The Duke of Edinburgh's Award
