= RECOVER Initiative =

American long COVID research program

The RECOVER Initiative is a research program run by the United States National Institutes of Health that aims to understand the causes of, discover treatments for and prevent Long COVID. RECOVER's initial studies were observational, but others focused on pathology of treatments have been performed. Plans for a series of treatment studies were announced in July 2023.

== Funding ==
A December 2020 allocation by Congress funded the creation of the program with $1.15 billion USD. In February 2024, the program received a further infusion of $515 million USD, extending the program until 2028.
