= President's Council on Sports, Fitness, and Nutrition =

American government organization promoting fitness

Agency overview
- Formed: July 16, 1956; 70 years ago
- Employees: 27
- Agency executives: Bryson DeChambeau, Chair; Catherine Granito, Executive Director
- Parent department: Department of Health and Human Services
- Parent agency: Office of Disease Prevention and Health Promotion
- Child agencies: Science Board; National Fitness Foundation
- Website: odphp.health.gov/pcsfn

The President's Council on Sports, Fitness and Nutrition (PCSFN) is a federal advisory committee of the United States that aims to promote "programs and initiatives that motivate people of all ages, backgrounds, and abilities to lead active, healthy lives." It is part of the Office of Disease Prevention and Health Promotion, an agency of the United States Department of Health and Human Services. Prior to June 2010, it was called the President's Council on Physical Fitness and Sports.

The council's work is informed by a Science Board, composed primarily of academic researchers and scholars. The first Science Board was appointed during the George W. Bush administration in 2003 with Charles B. "Chuck" Corbin, Ph.D., Arizona State University, serving as its inaugural chair. In 2016, Corbin received a Lifetime Achievement Award from the PCSFN.

The Science Board was active for several years, but eventually went dormant. It was reinstated on June 21, 2019, with strong urging from organizations such as the National Academy of Kinesiology.

A newly formed Science Board was announced on January 22, 2020, with Bradley J. Cardinal, Ph.D., Oregon State University, appointed as chair. During their 2-year term, the Science Board established the scientific basis of the National Youth Sports Strategy, including a wide variety of evidence-based documents and reports.

== History ==
During the 1940s, the American Medical Association and the National Committee on Physical Fitness had a joint committee encouraging physical fitness.

On July 16, 1956, President Dwight Eisenhower established The President's Council on Youth Fitness to encourage national improvement in children’s physical health.

In 1963, President Kennedy changed the council's name to President's Council on Physical Fitness to reflect its role to serve all Americans.

In 1966, President Lyndon Johnson created the Presidential Physical Fitness Award, the name of which was later changed to President's Challenge Youth Physical Fitness Awards Program. In 1968, the council's name was changed to President's Council on Physical Fitness and Sports to emphasize the importance of sports in life.

In 1972, the Presidential Sports Award Program was created.

In 1983, the United States Congress declared May as National Physical Fitness and Sports Month.

In 1996, the Surgeon General's Report on Physical Activity and Health was released. In 1997, the council released its report on Physical Activity and Sport in the Lives of Boys.

In June 2010, President Barack Obama renamed the agency the President's Council on Fitness, Sports and Nutrition, with a new emphasis on nutrition as an element of fitness. First Lady Michelle Obama announced the new commission's goal "to end the epidemic of childhood obesity in a generation" as part of her Let's Move! initiative, and also announced that the president had named, as the new co-chairs of the council, New Orleans Saints quarterback Drew Brees and former Olympic gymnast Dominique Dawes.

On January 11, 2012, operators of the website for participants of the Challenge and Active Lifestyle programs learned that the site had been hacked, resulting in the release of personal information of the participants. The President's Challenge site displayed a notice that it was down for "Site Maintenance – We're taking a little breather." On January 27, 2012, The President's Challenge sent out emails to its participants saying that the website was functional as of January 24, 2012, and asked participants to reset their user passwords.

On July 31, 2025, President Donald Trump reestablished the Presidential Fitness Test as part of the council's mandate, and revised the council membership to include up to 30 members. In August 2025, Catherine Granito and Bryson DeChambeau were named the executive director and council chair, respectively.

== Chairpersons ==
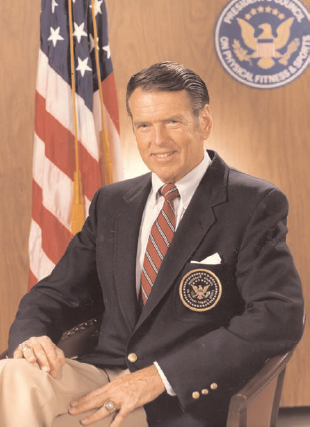
George Allen served as chairman from 1981 to 1988.

- Bud Wilkinson (chairman) 1961–1963
- Stan Musial consultant 1964–1967
- Jim Lovell (chairman) 1969–1977
- Jerry Apodaca (chairman) 1978–1980
- George Allen (chairman) 1981–1988
- Dick Kazmaier (chairman) 1988–1989
- Arnold Schwarzenegger (chairman) 1990–1993
- Florence Griffith Joyner (co-chair) 1993–1998
- Tom McMillen (co-chair) 1993–1997
- Lee Haney (chairman) 1999–2002
- Lynn Swann (chairman) 2002–2005
- Denise Austin 2002–2009
- Drew Brees (co-chair) 2010
- Dominique Dawes (co-chair) 2010
- Lou Ferrigno 2018
- Misty May-Treanor (co-chair) 2019
- Mehmet Oz (co-chair) 2018–2022
- Mariano Rivera (co-chair) 2019
- Herschel Walker (co-chair) 2019–2022
- Jose Andres (co-chair) 2022–2024
- Elena Delle Donne (co-chair) 2022–2024
- Bryson DeChambeau (chairman) 2025–present

== Awards ==
The council publishes guidelines for awards that are given out. They are the Presidential Physical Fitness Award, the National Physical Fitness Award, and the Participant Physical Fitness Award. However, it has been announced that the Physical Fitness Test on which these awards are based will no longer be available after the 2012–2013 school year. Additionally, there is the Active Lifestyle Award for staying active and the Presidential Champions Award for raising one's amount of activity. The Champions awards ended on 30 June 2018. There is also a Community Leadership Award that is given out annually to 50 people or organizations for encouraging physical activity, fitness, and nutrition.

=== Standardized tests ===
The award was given to students who achieved the top fifteenth percentile cumulative scores across these events and were based on age/gender and were taken by all participants. Pull ups/flexed-arm hang was based on gender and was the only event where one was done by boys and the other by girls:

- 50-yard dash
- 600-yard run
- Standing broad jump
- Pull-ups (boys)
- Flexed-arm hang (girls)
- Sit-ups
- Shuttle run
- Sit and reach

== See also ==
- The President's Challenge
