= Long COVID =

Long-term complication of COVID-19

- Other names: Long-haul COVID, post-COVID-19 syndrome, post-COVID-19 condition, post-acute sequelae of COVID-19 (PASC), chronic COVID syndrome
- Symptoms: Highly varied, including post-exertional malaise (symptoms worsen with effort), fatigue, muscle pain, shortness of breath, chest pain, cognitive dysfunction
- Duration: Weeks to years, possibly lifelong
- Causes: COVID-19 infection
- Risk factors: Female sex, age, obesity, asthma, more severe COVID-19 infection
- Frequency: 50–85% of hospitalised COVID-19 cases, 10–35% of non-hospitalised cases, and 8–12% of vaccinated cases

Long COVID or long-haul COVID is a group of health problems persisting or developing after an initial period of COVID‑19 from SARS-CoV-2 infection. Symptoms can last weeks, months, or years and are often debilitating. The World Health Organization defines long COVID as starting three months after the initial disease, but other agencies define it as starting at four weeks after the initial COVID-19.

Long COVID is characterised by a large number of symptoms that sometimes disappear and then reappear. Commonly reported symptoms of long COVID are fatigue, memory problems, shortness of breath, and sleep disorder. Several other symptoms, including headaches, mental health issues, initial loss of smell or taste, muscle weakness, fever, and cognitive dysfunction ("brain fog") may also present. Symptoms often get worse after mental or physical effort, a process called post-exertional malaise (PEM). There is a large overlap in symptoms with myalgic encephalomyelitis/chronic fatigue syndrome (ME/CFS).

The causes of long COVID are not understood. Hypotheses include lasting damage to organs and blood vessels, problems with blood clotting, neurological dysfunction, persistent virus or a reactivation of latent viruses and autoimmunity. Diagnosis of long COVID is based on (suspected or confirmed) COVID‑19 infection or symptoms—and by excluding alternative diagnoses.

Many of the symptoms attributed to long COVID are non-specific and occur in other conditions, which makes it difficult to know the true prevalence of long COVID. As of 2025, the prevalence of long COVID is estimated to be about 6–7% in adults, and about 1% in children. Prevalence might be reduced after vaccination. Risk factors include but are not limited to higher age, female sex, having asthma, and a more severe initial COVID‑19 infection. Anyone can develop long COVID. As of 2025, there are no validated effective treatments. Management of long COVID depends on symptoms. Rest is recommended for fatigue and pacing for post-exertional malaise. People with severe symptoms or those who were in intensive care may require care from a team of specialists. Most people with symptoms at 4 weeks recover by 12 weeks. Recovery is slower (or plateaus) for those still ill at 12 weeks. For a subset of people, for instance, those meeting the criteria for ME/CFS, symptoms may be lifelong, although this cannot yet be determined.

Globally, over 400 million people have experienced long COVID. Long COVID may be responsible for a loss of 1% of the world's gross domestic product.

== Classification and terminology ==
Long COVID is a patient-created term coined early in the pandemic by those suffering from long-term symptoms. While long COVID is the most prevalent name, the terms long-haul COVID, post-COVID‑19 syndrome, post-COVID‑19 condition, post-acute sequelae of COVID‑19 (PASC), and chronic COVID syndrome are also in use.

Long COVID may not be a single disease or syndrome. It could be an umbrella term including permanent organ damage, post-intensive care syndrome, post-viral fatigue syndrome and post-COVID syndrome.

=== Definitions ===
There are multiple definitions of long COVID, depending on country and institution. The most accepted is the World Health Organization (WHO) definition.

The definitions differ in when long COVID starts, and how long persistent symptoms must have lasted. For instance, the WHO puts the onset of long COVID at three months post-infection, if there have been at least two months of persistent symptoms. In contrast, the US Centers for Disease Control and Prevention (CDC) puts the onset of "Post-COVID Conditions" at four weeks "to emphasize the importance of initial clinical evaluation and supportive care during the initial 4 to 12 weeks after acute COVID‑19" According to the US National Institutes of Health (NIH), postacute sequalae of SARS-CoV-2 (PASC) refers to ongoing, relapsing, or new symptoms, or other health effects that occur four or more weeks after the acute phase of SARS-CoV-2 infection.

The British National Institute for Health and Care Excellence (NICE) divides long COVID into two categories:

- ongoing symptomatic COVID‑19 for effects from four to twelve weeks after onset, and
- post-COVID‑19 syndrome for effects that persist 12 or more weeks after onset.

The clinical case definitions specify symptom onset and development. For instance, the WHO definition indicates that "symptoms might be new onset following initial recovery or persist from the initial illness. Symptoms may also fluctuate or relapse over time."

The NICE and WHO definition further require the exclusion of alternative diagnoses.

Specifically for children and young people, a group of experts in the UK have published the only research definition which complements the clinical case definition in adults proposed by the WHO. This consensus research definition for long COVID in children and young people is: "Post COVID‑19 condition occurs in young people with a history of confirmed SARS-CoV-2 infection, with at least one persisting physical symptom for a minimum duration of 12 weeks after initial testing that cannot be explained by an alternative diagnosis. The symptoms have an impact on everyday functioning, may continue or develop after COVID infection, and may fluctuate of relapse over time. The positive COVID‑19 test referred to in this definition can be a lateral flow antigen test, a PCR test or an antibody test."

The definition is expected to change as scientific understanding improves. The US National Academies noted in 2024 that no current definition can correctly classify affected people while ensuring nobody is wrongly included.

=== Related illnesses ===
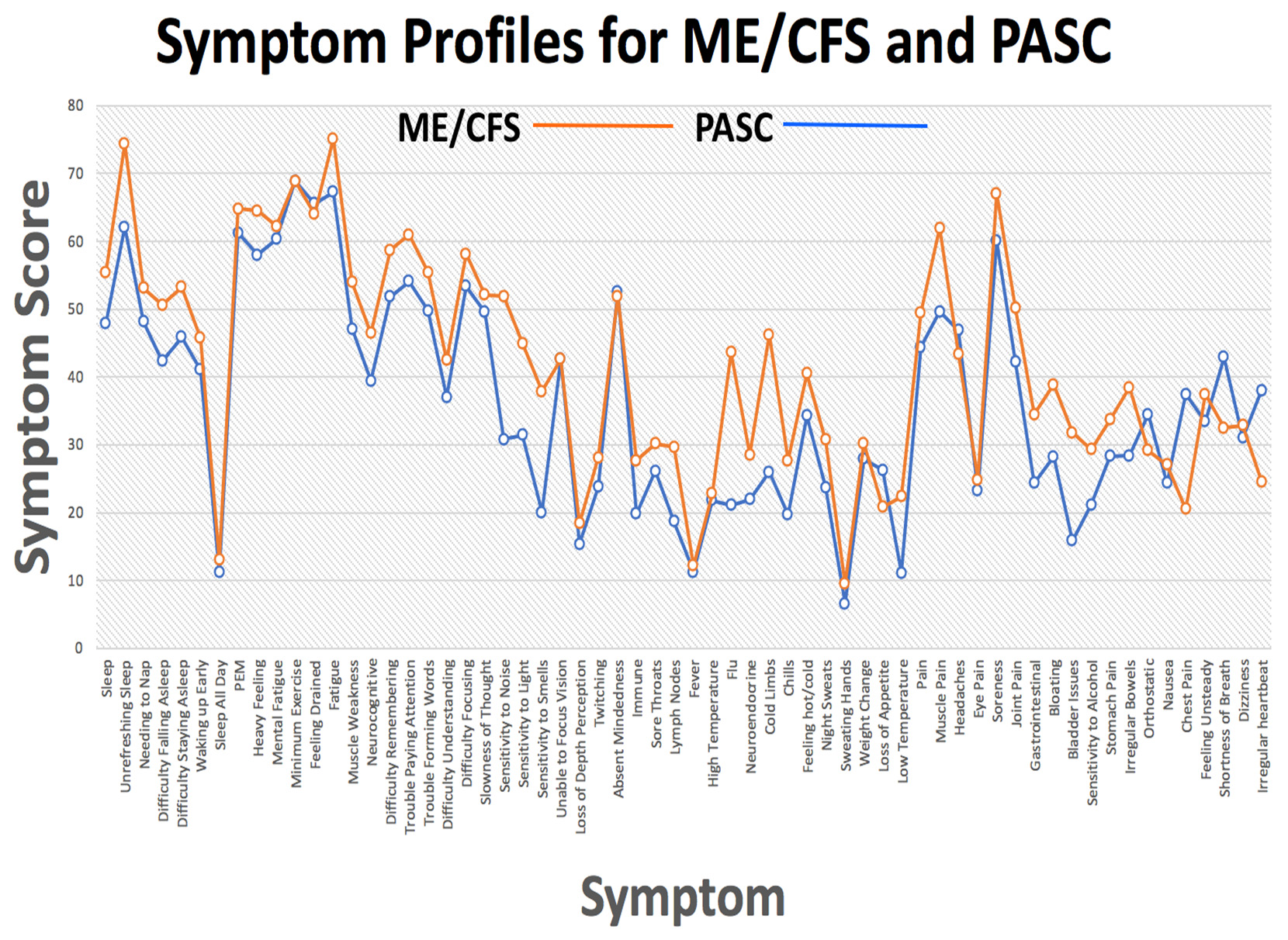
Many symptoms have similar severity in long COVID and ME/CFS.

Long COVID is a post-acute infection syndrome (PAIS) and shares similarities with other such syndromes. For instance, there are similarities with post-Ebola syndrome and aftereffects of the chikungunya virus. These conditions may have similar pathophysiology to long COVID.

Long COVID has many symptoms in common with myalgic encephalomyelitis/chronic fatigue syndrome (ME/CFS) and research estimates half of people with long COVID meet ME/CFS diagnostic criteria. Like long COVID, ME/CFS is often triggered by infections, and some biological changes overlap. Dysautonomia and postural orthostatic tachycardia syndrome (POTS) are also potential shared aspects of long COVID and ME/CFS. However, long COVID symptoms include loss of smell and taste, neither of which feature frequently in ME/CFS.

== Signs and symptoms ==
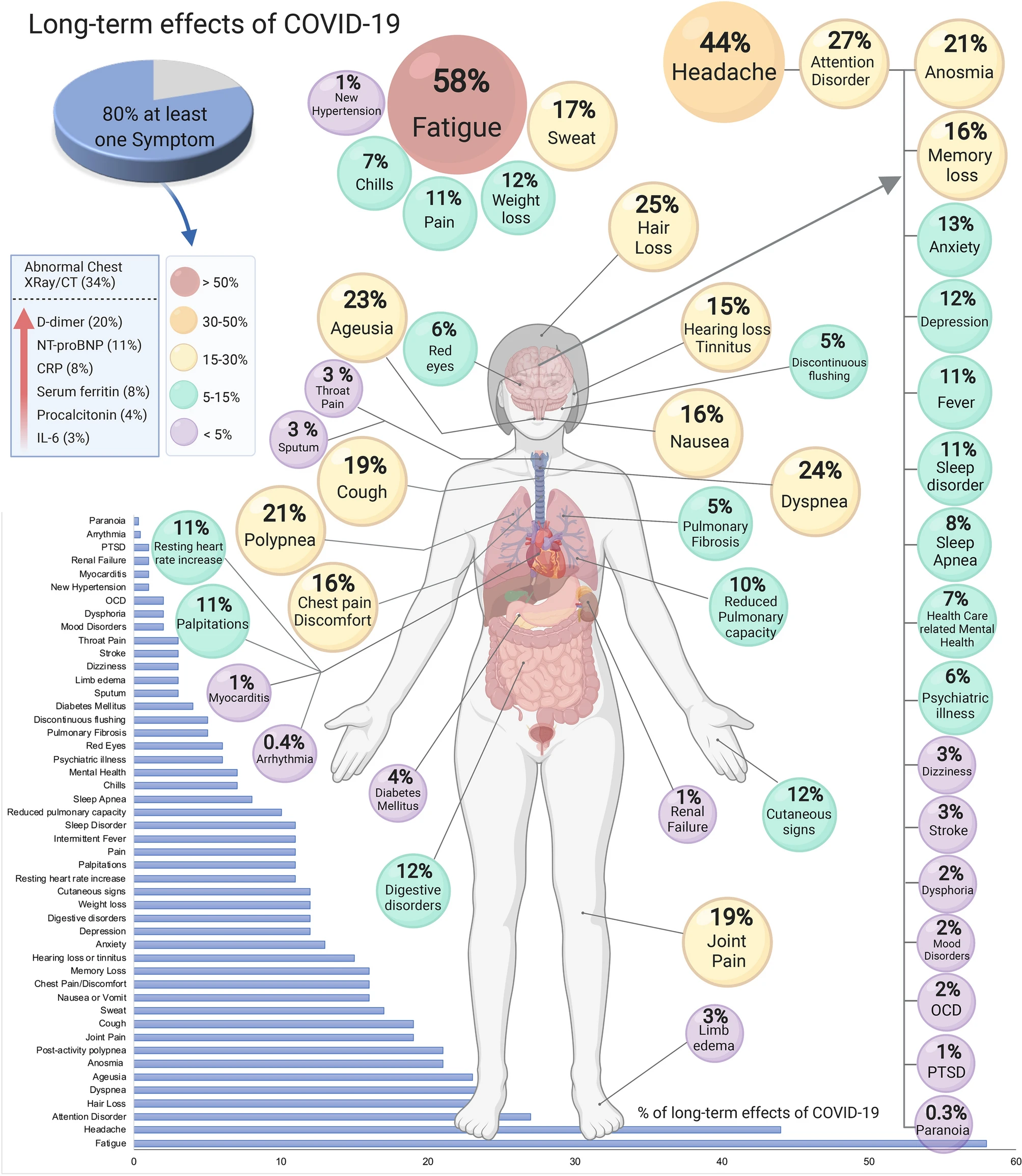
There are over 50 long-term effects of COVID-19, including those that are symptoms of long COVID. The image shows the symptoms along with their estimated prevalence. Around 80% of people have at least one overall effect beyond two weeks following infection.

External videos
- "Long Covid: A parallel pandemic", Akiko Iwasaki and others, Knowable Magazine, 8 August 2022.

There is a large set of symptoms associated with long COVID, impacting many different organs and body systems. Long COVID symptoms can differ significantly from person to person. Symptom severity ranges from mild to incapacitating. Many symptoms reported in long COVID are non-specific, which makes it difficult to definitively attribute them to prior SARS-CoV-2 infection.

Common symptoms reported in studies include fatigue, muscle pain, shortness of breath, chest pain, cognitive dysfunction ("brain fog") and post-exertional malaise (symptoms worsen after activity). This symptom worsening typically occurs 12 to 48 hours after activity and can be triggered by either mental or physical effort. It lasts between days and weeks.

Children and adolescents can also experience serious symptoms and long-term adverse health effects, including serious mental health impacts related to persistent COVID‑19 symptoms. The most common symptoms in children are persistent fever, sore throat, problems with sleep, headaches, shortness of breath, muscle weakness, fatigue, loss of smell or distorted smell, and anxiety. Children and adolescents with long COVID experience three or more symptoms more frequently than control groups, but this has low certainty.

=== Neurological symptoms ===
Common neurological symptoms in long COVID are difficulty concentrating, cognitive impairment and headaches. People also frequently experience loss of taste and loss of smell. Likewise children and young people may also experience cognitive impairment.

Some people with long COVID experience dysautonomia, a malfunction of the autonomic nervous system. People with dysautonomia may experience palpitations and tachycardia (raised heart rate) after minor effort or upon standing up. This can be associated with dizziness and nausea. If the heart rate is raised by 30 beats per minute or more after continuous standing, this is described as postural orthostatic tachycardia syndrome.

In terms of mental health, people with long COVID often experience sleep difficulties. Depression and anxiety levels are raised in the first two months after infection, but return to normal afterwards. This was in contrast to other neurological symptoms, such as brain fog and seizures, which lasted at least two years. However, among people who were hospitalised for COVID, many have depression and anxiety 2 to 3 years after their infection.

=== Lungs, heart and digestive system ===
Difficulty breathing is the second-most common symptom of long COVID, but this subjective symptom does not track with the severity of objective markers of inflammation. Shortness of breath is among the most common symptoms in children and young people as well. People can also experience a persistent cough.

In the cardiovascular system, effort intolerance (i.e., reduced ability to perform physical activities) and chest pain occur often in people with long COVID. Sufferers of Long COVID are also at increased risks of developing strokes (i.e., damage to the brain caused by poor blood flow), myocarditis (i.e., Inflammation of the heart muscle), the postural orthostatic tachycardia syndrome (i.e., abnormally large increases in heart rate upon sitting up or standing), pulmonary embolisms (i.e., blockage of an artery in the lungs), deep vein thrombosis (i.e., blood clots in a deep vein, such as one in the legs or pelvis), and myocardial infarction (i.e., heart attack).

Less frequently, people with long COVID experience diarrhoea and nausea.

=== Reproductive system ===
In the female reproductive system, long COVID may disrupt fertility, the menstrual cycle, menopause, gonadal function, and ovarian sufficiency. Exacerbation of other long COVID symptoms around menstruation has also been documented.

=== Other symptoms ===
Joint pain and muscle pain are frequently reported as symptoms of long COVID. Some people experience hair loss and skin rashes. People are at increased risk of type 1 or type 2 diabetes after recovering from acute COVID.

=== Subgroups ===
Because the symptom combinations of long COVID vary significantly from person to person, one approach to researching the condition is to define subgroups or clusters of long-haulers. This would allow for more targeted clinical care.

== Causes and mechanisms ==
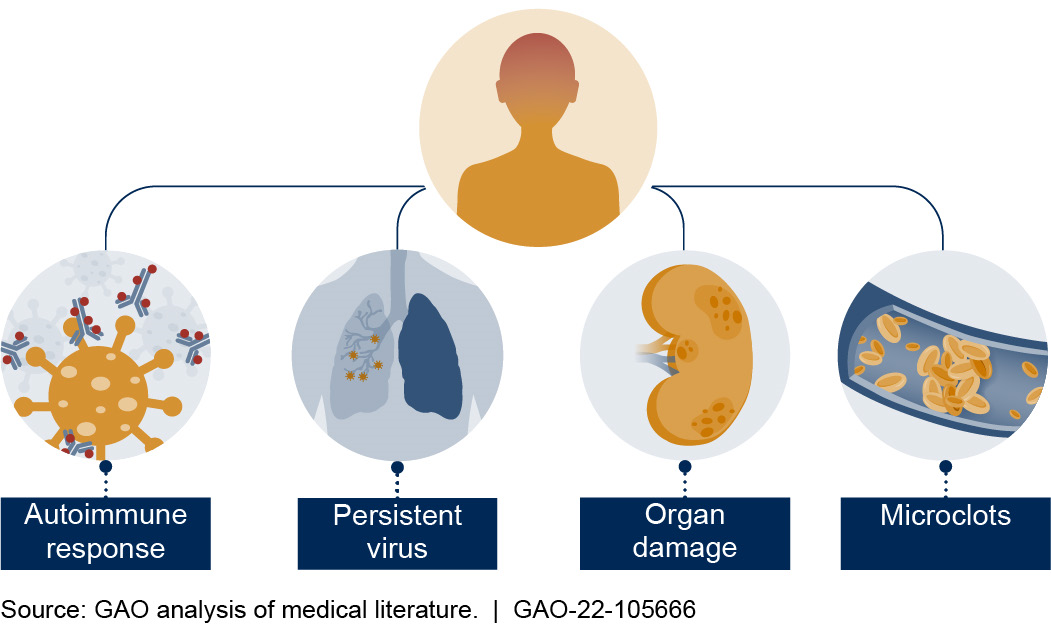
Possible causes of long COVID

The causes of long COVID are not understood. Hundreds of potential blood biomarkers have been investigated, but no single blood biomarker has been shown to reliably identify long COVID. There are potentially many overlapping mechanisms that all contribute to the development of long COVID. Organ damage from the acute infection can explain a part of the symptoms, but long COVID is also observed in people where organ damage seems to be absent. Several hypotheses have been put forward explaining long COVID, including:

- blood clotting and endothelial dysfunction in the blood vessels
- neurological issues: problems with signalling from the brainstem and the vagus nerve
- immune system dysregulation, including the reactivation of viruses like the Epstein–Barr virus
- impacts of the virus on the microbiota, including viral persistence
- autoimmunity

Further hypotheses include a dysfunction of the mitochondria and the cellular energy system, persistent systemic inflammation, and the persistence of SARS-COV-19 antigens.

=== Pathophysiology ===
Organ damage from the acute infection may explain symptoms in some people with long COVID. Radiological tests such as lung magnetic resonance imaging (MRI) often show up as normal even for people who show clear desaturation (lowered blood oxygen level) after mild exercise. Other tests, such as a dual-energy CT scan, do show perfusion defects in a subset of people with respiratory symptoms. Imaging of the heart show contradictory results. Imaging of brains show changes after COVID infection, even if this has not been studied in relation to long COVID. For instance, some show a smaller olfactory bulb, a brain region associated with smell.

In a subset of people with long COVID, there is evidence that SARS-COV-2 remains in the body after the acute infection. This evidence comes from biopsies, studies of blood plasma, and by the indirect immune effects of persistent virus. Viral DNA or proteins have been found months to a year after acute infection in various studies. A small study demonstrated viral RNA up to nearly two years after an acute infection in people with long COVID. Persistent virus has also been found in people without long COVID, but at a lower rate. Persistent virus could lead to symptoms via possible effects on coagulation and via microbiome and neuroimmune abnormalities.

During or after acute COVID infection, various dormant viruses can become reactivated. For instance, SARS-COV-2 can reactivate the Epstein-Barr virus, the virus that is responsible for infectious mononucleosis. This virus lies dormant in most people. There is some evidence of a relationship between its reactivation and long COVID. A correlation was also found between reactivation of endogenous retroviruses and severity of active COVID‑19.

Autoimmunity is another potential cause of long COVID. Some studies report auto-antibodies (antibodies directed against an individual's own proteins) in people with long COVID, but they are not found in all studies. Autoantibodies are often induced during acute COVID, with a moderate relationship to disease severity. Evidence from electronic health care records show that people develop auto-immune diseases, such as lupus and rheumatoid arthritis, more frequently after a COVID‑19 infection, compared to controls.

Issues with increased blood clotting are another potential driver of long COVID development. During acute infection, there is direct damage to the linings of blood vessels (endothelial damage), and the risk of thrombosis-related diseases stays elevated longer-term after infection. Issues with blood clotting can include hyperactive platelets and microclots. These microclots may induce oxygen shortage (hypoxia) in tissues. The clotting may potentially be driven by autoantibodies.

Several studies suggest that brain penetration of serum components and cytokines as derived from breakdowns to the integrity of the blood–brain barrier could contribute to the neurological manifestations of long COVID.

=== Risk factors ===
Women are more at risk than men. Age has been identified as another risk factor, with older people seemingly more at risk. This is also true for children, with older children at a higher risk than younger children. Most diagnoses of long COVID are in the 36–50 age bracket. Risks of developing long COVID are also higher for people with lower incomes, people with fewer years of education and those from disadvantaged ethnic groups. People who smoke also have a higher risk of developing long COVID.

Various health issues raise the risk of long COVID. For instance, people with obesity more often report long COVID. Asthma and chronic obstructive pulmonary disease are also risk factors. In terms of mental health, depression and anxiety raise risks.

Characteristics of the acute infection play a role in developing long COVID. People who experience a larger number of symptoms during the acute infection are more likely to develop long COVID, as well as people who require hospitalisation.

In children and young people, the risk factors for long COVID include female sex, older age, and pre-existing diseases or mental health problems.

Long COVID risks may have been higher with the SARS-CoV2 Delta variant compared to the Omicron variant. The higher infection rate from the Omicron variant means that it is still responsible for a large group of long-haulers.

== Diagnosis ==
There is currently no diagnostic test for long COVID, and there is no consensus on diagnostic criteria. There are no standardised tests to determine if symptoms persisting after COVID‑19 infection are due to long COVID. Diagnosis is based on a history of suspected or confirmed COVID‑19 symptoms, and by considering and ruling out alternative diagnoses. Diagnosis of long COVID can be challenging because of the wide range of symptoms people with long COVID may display. Many of the symptoms are not specific to long COVID and can occur in other medical conditions.

Early diagnostic criteria of long COVID required a laboratory-confirmed COVID‑19 infection, but criteria do not require this anymore, given that people may not get tested during the acute infection. For instance, people who develop long COVID after asymptomatic infection would have little reason to get tested. Furthermore, tests for COVID are not foolproof, and can come back negative. False negatives are more common for children, women and people with a low viral load.

There are diagnostic tools available for some elements of long COVID, such as the tilt table test or a NASA lean test for POTS and MRI scans to test for cardiovascular impairment. Routine tests offered in standard care often come back normal.

== Prevention ==
Preventing a COVID-19 infection is the most effective way to prevent long COVID, for instance by wearing a properly fitted N95 mask, improving ventilation, avoiding contact with people who test positive for COVID, and washing hands. Treatment during the acute phase may also reduce the risk of long COVID. For example, in two large, randomised, placebo-controlled clinical trials, treatment with metformin during acute infection lowered risk of diagnosis with Long COVID by 41-50%.

COVID-19 vaccination seems to reduce risk of long COVID. Three doses of a COVID-19 vaccine may reduce the risk by 70%, while two doses give 43% protection and one dose gives 19% protection. The evidence is based on observational studies, rather than on randomised clinical trials. The large randomised control trials on COVID-19 vaccines did not include long COVID as an outcome measure. An analysis involving more than 20 million adults found that vaccinated people had a lower risk of long COVID compared with those who had not received a COVID‑19 vaccine; they were also protected against blood clots and heart failure development after the infection.

== Treatment ==
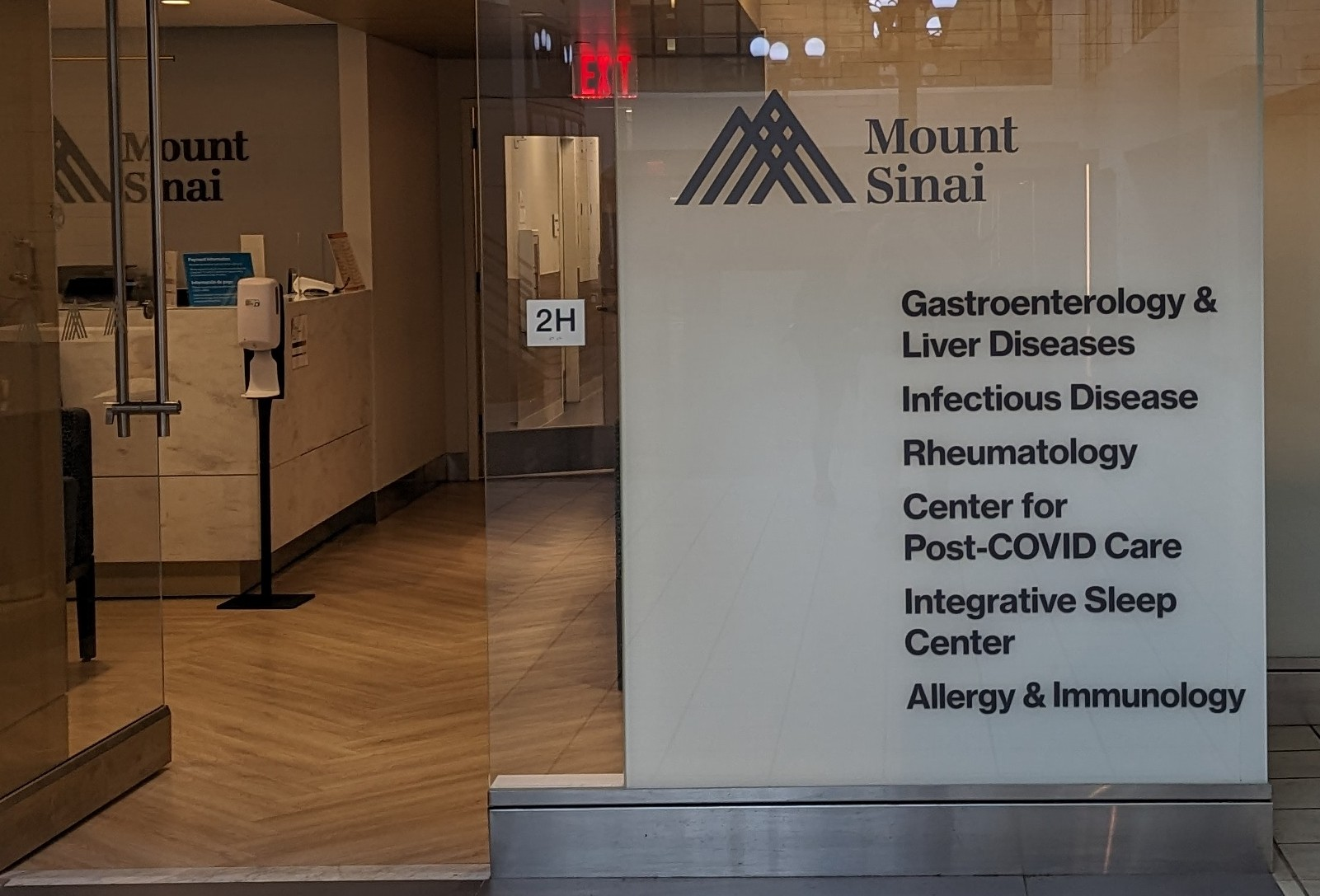
Center for Post-COVID Care at Mount Sinai's Union Square offices in New York City

As of 2026, no treatments have been established as effective for long COVID as a whole, although treatments are available for some individual symptoms and associated conditions. A 2025 review of interventions for managing long COVID symptoms concluded that the evidence for selecting certain interventions was highly imprecise with substantial clinical uncertainty, leading affected people to use costly and ineffective self-treatment options. Dismissive attitudes by clinicians for applying interventions, inadequate coverage of treatment by insurance companies, and restricted access to clinical specialists are also discouraging long COVID treatment plans.

People with long COVID may need care within several clinical disciplines for long-term monitoring or intervention of ongoing symptoms, and to implement social services, physical therapy, or mental health care. In some countries, such as the UK and Germany, specialised long COVID outpatient clinics have been established to assess individual cases for the extent of surveillance and treatment needed. Primary care physicians should provide the first assessment of people with long COVID symptoms, leading to specialist referrals for more complex long COVID symptoms.

Management of long COVID depends on symptoms. Rest, planning and prioritising are advised for people with fatigue. People who get post-exertional malaise may benefit from activity management with pacing. People with allergic-type symptoms, such as skin rashes, may benefit from antihistamines. Those with autonomic dysfunction may benefit from increased intake of fluids, electrolytes and compression garments.

Long-term follow-up of people with long COVID involves outcome reports from the people themselves to assess the impact on their quality of life, especially for those who were not hospitalised and receiving regular clinical follow-up. Digital technologies, such as videoconferencing, are being implemented between primary care physicians and people with long COVID as part of long-term monitoring.

== Prognosis ==
Around two in three with symptoms at four weeks are expected to recover fully by week twelve. However, the prognosis varies by person, and some may find symptoms worsen within the first three months. Recovery after twelve weeks is variable: some people plateau, whilst others see a slow recovery.

The prognosis also varies by symptom: neurological symptoms may have a delayed onset, and some get worse over time. Symptoms of the gut and lungs are more likely to reduce over time. Pain in muscles and joints seems worse at 2 years than at 1 year after infection. If people meet the diagnostic criteria for ME/CFS or for dysautonomia, their symptoms may be lifelong, although this cannot yet be determined.

== Epidemiology ==
Long COVID's prevalence varies by age and gender in the United States.

Estimates of the incidence and prevalence of long COVID vary widely. The estimates depend on the definition of long COVID, the population studied, as well as a number of other methodological differences, such as whether a comparable cohort of individuals without COVID‑19 were included, what kinds of symptoms are considered representative of long COVID, and whether long COVID is assessed through a review of symptoms, through self-report of long COVID status, or some other method. A 2024 systematic umbrella review found that selection and ascertainment biases were common in the prevalence literature.

In general, estimates of long COVID incidence based on statistically random sampling of the population are much lower than those based on certified infection, which has a tendency to skew towards more serious cases (including over-representation of hospitalised patients). Further, since incidence appears to be correlated with severity of infection, it is lower in vaccinated groups, on reinfection and during the omicron era, meaning that the time when data was recorded is important. For example, the UK's Office for National Statistics reported in February 2023 (based on random sampling) that "2.4% of adults and 0.6% of children and young people reported long COVID following a second COVID‑19 infection". However, a prospective study by Statistics Canada identified a cumulative incidence of 15% after a first infection, 27% after two infections, and 38% after 3 infections.

An August 2024 review found that the prevalence of long COVID is estimated to be about 6–7% in adults, and about 1% in children. By the end of 2023, roughly 400 million people had or have had long COVID. This may be a conservative estimate, as it is based on studies counting those with specific long COVID symptoms only, and not counting those who developed long COVID after an asymptomatic infection. While hospitalised people have higher risks of getting long COVID, most long-haulers had a mild infection and were able to recover from the acute infection at home.

Two meta-analyses estimated the incidence of long COVID after infection at 43% and 58%. These estimates are controversial, as the primary studies they assessed had sampling and other biases. Furthermore, none of the definitions of long COVID have a minimum severity, so these numbers also include people with a single symptom that does not really affect them much.

In the United States in June 2023, 6% of the population indicated having long COVID, as defined as symptoms that last for 3 months or more. This percentage had stayed stable since January that year, but was a decrease compared to June 2022. Of people who had had a prior COVID infection, 11% indicated having long COVID. A quarter of those reported significant limitation in activity. A study by the Medical Expenditure Panel Survey estimated that nearly 18 million people — had suffered from long COVID as of 2023, building on a study sponsored by the Agency for Healthcare Research and Quality.

In a large population cohort study in Scotland, 42% of respondents said they had not fully recovered after 6 to 18 months after catching COVID, and 6% indicated they had not recovered at all. The risk of long COVID was associated with disease severity; people with asymptomatic infection did not have increased risk of long COVID symptoms compared to people who had never been infected. Those that had been hospitalised had 4.6 times higher odds of no recovery compared to nonhospitalised people.

Long COVID is less common in children and adolescents than in adults. Around 16% of children and adolescents develop long COVID following infection.

== Society and culture ==
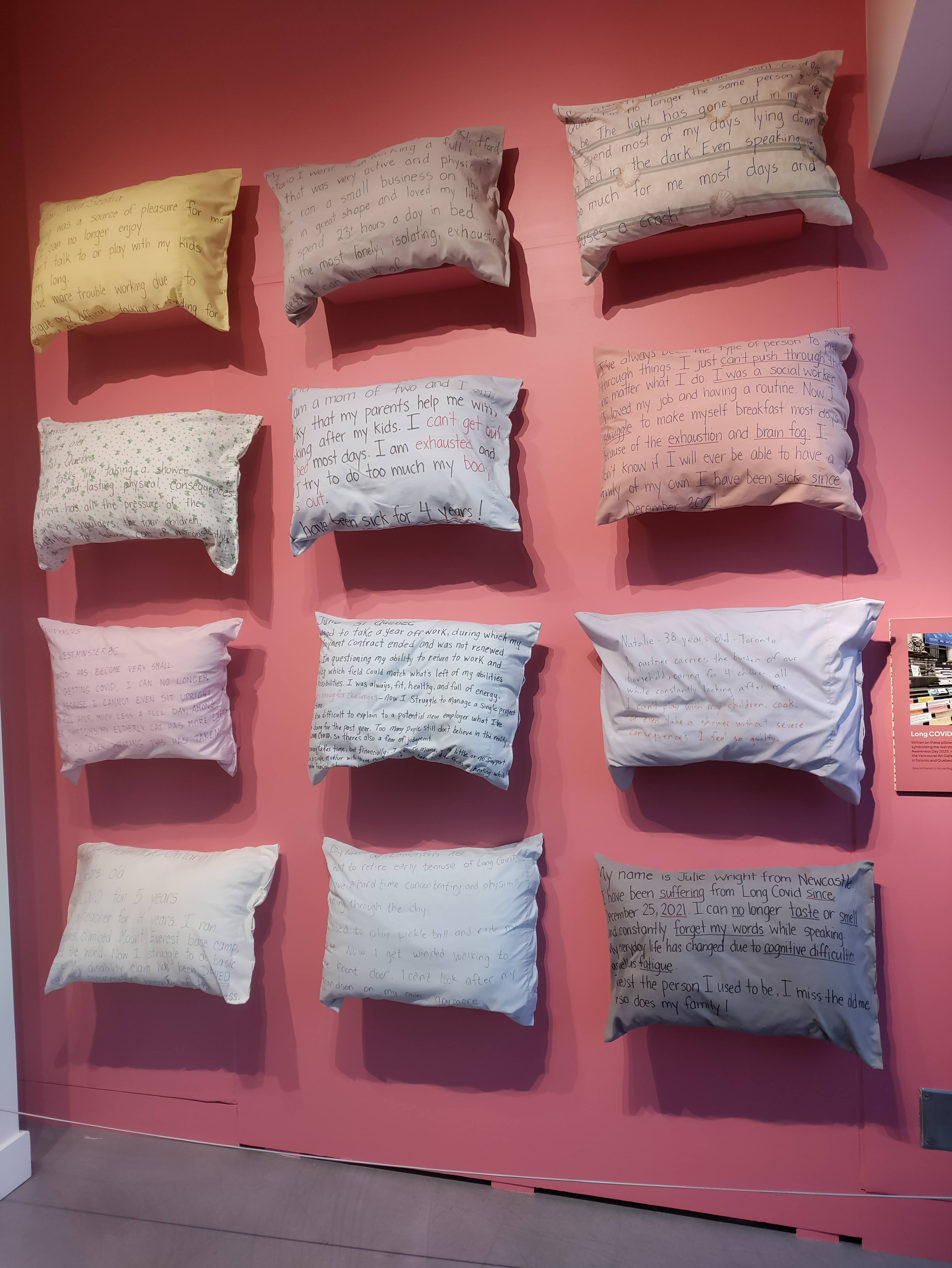
A wall of pillows at the Museum of Vancouver, each bearing stories from people with Long COVID

=== Patient community and activism ===
Early in the pandemic, official guidance made a distinction between those with mild illness who did not require hospitalisation, and those with severe illness which did require hospitalisation. The typical recovery time for those with mild illness was said to be around two weeks and media attention was mostly focused on those with a severe infection. Patients with long-lasting systems after a mild infection started to describe their symptoms on Twitter and blogs, challenging official assumptions.

The term long COVID was reportedly first used in May 2020 as a hashtag on Twitter by Elisa Perego, an archaeologist at University College London. A month later, #LongCovid became a popular hashtag, alongside hashtags from non-English budding communities (for instance, #AprèsJ20 in French, and #koronaoire in Finnish).

Experiences shared online filled a gap in knowledge in how the media talked about the pandemic. Via the media, the knowledge reached governments and health officials, making long COVID "the first illness created through patients finding one another on Twitter".

Some people experiencing long COVID have formed community care networks and support groups on social media websites. Social media data has also been used as a primary research source for studying long COVID experiences. A 2025 study by researchers at University College London, published in Frontiers in Big Data, used Pulsar social listening platform to collect and analyse public posts examining narratives around dietary supplement use and mental health among people with long COVID. The study identified patterns in self-directed coping strategies shared online in the absence of formal medical guidelines. Internationally, there are several long COVID advocacy groups. Clinical advice on self-management and online healthcare programmes are used to support people with long COVID.

In 2023, the organisation International Long Covid Awareness (ILCA) created International Long Covid Awareness Day on 15 March.

The Museum of Vancouver began hosting the exhibition "Living with Long COVID" in October 2025, which includes stories and photographs from 46 people with the condition in Canada. The exhibition was co-produced with Simon Fraser University, and is scheduled to remain in place until March 2026.

=== Stigma in healthcare ===
Many people with long COVID have difficulty accessing appropriate healthcare. The severity of their symptoms may be disbelieved, they may be subject to unsympathetic care, and their symptoms may not be investigated properly or may be falsely attributed to anxiety. People with long COVID may be misdiagnosed with mental disorders. Anxiety and depression questionnaires not designed for people with medical conditions can contribute to this; for example, a questionnaire may assume fatigue is due to depression or that palpitations are due to anxiety, even if explained by another condition like myalgic encephalomyelitis/chronic fatigue syndrome (ME/CFS) or postural orthostatic tachycardia syndrome (POTS). These issues of dismissal of symptoms by healthcare providers and possible neglect in research efforts parallel other post-viral illnesses, such as ME/CFS.

=== Work-related impacts ===
The impact of long COVID on people's ability to work is large. Estimates vary on how many people are out of work, or work reduced hours because of long COVID. For those with mild or moderate disease, between 12% and 23% had had long periods of absence or remained absent from work at 3 to 7 months. The share of people working adjusted hours or tasks after mild or moderate COVID, was around 8% to 45% after three to eight months. The percentage of people returning to work after hospitalisation was lower. Return to work after hospitalisation differed by country. In China and the US a higher percentage went back to work. In the US this could be partially explained by a lack of paid sick leave for some workers.

The Institute for Fiscal Studies studied labour impacts of long COVID in the UK in 2021. They concluded that of people who worked before contracting long COVID, one in ten had stopped working. Most of them were on sick leave rather than unemployed. It is estimated that reduced working hours and absence from work due to long COVID costs the UK economy £5.7 billion. The equivalent figure for informal carers of people with long COVID is £4.8 billion.

=== Economic impacts ===
The OECD estimates that 3 million people have left the work force due to long COVID in OECD countries. Only counting lost wages, this would amount to an economic loss of US$141 billion. When taking into account reduced quality of life as well, yearly economics costs due to long COVID were estimated to be between US$864 billion and US$1.04 trillion. This does not include health care costs. As a share of global GDP, impacts are estimated to be between 0.5% and 2.3%.

A study estimated that long COVID contributes to global economic cost of about $1 trillion a year for the 400 million afflicted.

== Research ==
Research is ongoing in many areas, including developing more accurate diagnostic criteria, refining estimates of its likelihood, identifying risk factors, gathering data for its impact on daily life, discovering which populations face barriers to adequate care, and learning how much protection vaccination provides.

Many experimental and repurposed drugs are being investigated as possible treatments for different aspects of long COVID. These include the anti-inflammatory colchicine, the anticoagulant rivaroxaban, the antihistamines famotidine and loratadine, various immune-modulating drugs, and the experimental aptamer compound BC-007 (Rovunaptabin).

In 2021, the US National Institutes of Health started funding the RECOVER Initiative, backed by $1.15 billion over four years, to identify the causes, prevention and treatment of long COVID. In 2023, the Office of Long COVID Research and Practice was created to coordinate research across US government agencies. At the same time, RECOVER announced which clinical trials it will fund: these include a trial of Paxlovid against potential persistent infection, one for sleep disorder, one for cognitive impairment and one for problems with the autonomic nervous system.

In 2023, a survey of over 3,700 people in the UK with long COVID, fatigue was the strongest predictor of poor everyday functioning, with depression and brain fog also being linked. Some 20% of those surveyed reported being unable to work.

In 2024, researchers working at UK universities published a commentary on what can be learned from long COVID in order to be better prepared for and recover faster from future pandemics. Some of these considerations include continuing the collection of large-scale data and making it easily accessible, involving those affected by long COVID in research, and focusing on health inequalities affecting recovery and wellbeing.

A 2025 systematic review reported improvements in memory, executive function, attention, and fatigue with minimal adverse effects by use of hyperbaric oxygen therapy.

== See also ==
- Impact of the COVID-19 pandemic on neurological, psychological and other mental health outcomes – both acute and chronic neurological, psychiatric, olfactory, and mental health conditions
- List of people with long COVID
- Multisystem inflammatory syndrome in children – paediatric comorbidity from COVID-19
- Post viral cerebellar ataxia – clumsy movement appearing a few weeks after a viral infection
