= Orthostatic hypertension =

- Other names: Postural hypertension
- Specialty: Neurology, cardiology

Orthostatic hypertension is a medical condition consisting of an abrupt increase in blood pressure (BP) when a person stands up. Orthostatic hypertension is diagnosed by a rise in systolic BP of 20 mmHg or more when standing, in combination with a standing systolic BP of at least 140 mmHg. When systolic BP remains under 140 mmHg, this is called exaggerated blood pressure response to standing (ERTS).

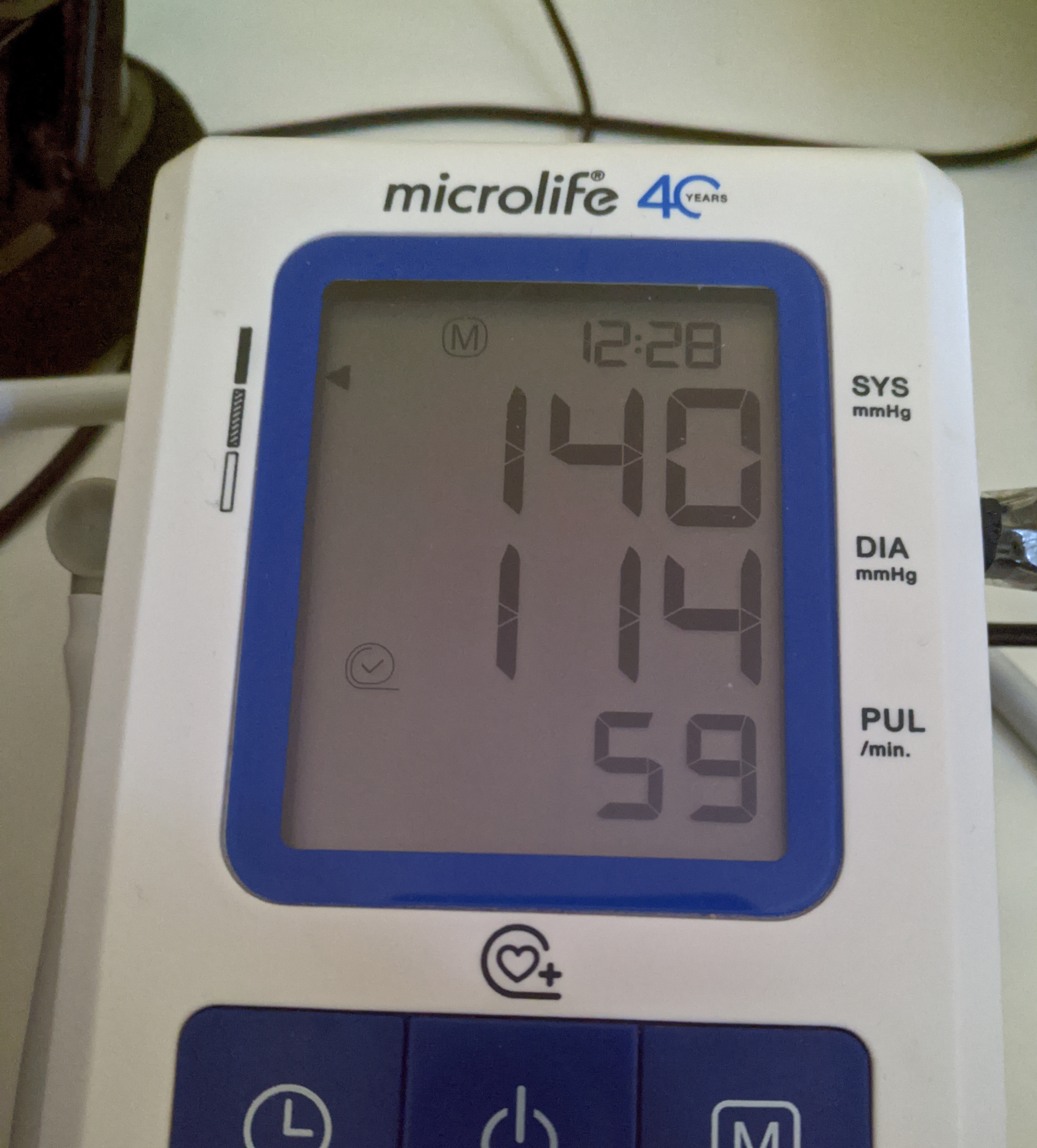
High diastolic blood pressure measured while standing in a person who stood up shortly after waking up.

When it affects an individual's ability to remain upright, orthostatic hypertension is considered as a form of orthostatic intolerance. The body's inability to regulate blood pressure can be a type of dysautonomia.

Baroreflex and autonomic pathways normally ensure that blood pressure is maintained despite various stimuli, including postural change. The precise mechanism of orthostatic hypertension remains unclear, but alpha-adrenergic activity may be the predominant mechanism of orthostatic hypertension in elderly hypertensive patients. Other mechanisms are proposed for other groups with this disorder.

A prevalence of 1.1% was found in a large population study. The risk of orthostatic hypertension has been found to increase with age, with it being found in 16.3% of older hypertensive patients.

== Causes ==
The causes of this condition are not well understood, but research suggests that it may be caused by a combination of hemodynamic and neurohumoral factors.

Some studies have found that orthostatic hypertension may be caused by increased vascular resistance, possibly due to excess plasma shifts or increased blood viscosity. Other studies have suggested that it may be caused by a reduction in cardiac preload, or an increase in venous pooling.

Research suggests that it may be caused by an overshoot in neurohumoral adjustments to standing. Some studies have found that patients with orthostatic hypertension have normal levels of venous plasma norepinephrine, but that these levels increase excessively upon standing. However, other studies have not found elevated levels of norepinephrine in patients with orthostatic hypertension compared to hypertensive controls. These findings suggest that the causes of orthostatic hypertension may be multifactorial and more research is needed to fully understand the underlying mechanisms.

== Signs and symptoms ==
- Mild or moderate orthostatic hypertension may present without any symptoms other than the orthostatic hypertension BP findings. More severe orthostatic hypertension may present with the typical symptoms of hypertension.
- Orthostatic venous pooling is common with orthostatic diastolic hypertension. This occurs in the legs while standing.

=== Connections to other disorders ===
- Essential hypertension
- Other kinds of dysautonomia may coexist, e.g., postural orthostatic tachycardia syndrome (POTS) is common with this condition, orthostatic hypotension with the BP going both high and low at times due to autonomic dysfunction
- Type 2 diabetes
- Vascular adrenergic hypersensitivity: Orthostatic hypertension can be secondary to this
- Anorexia nervosa: Many people suffering from anorexia experience orthostatic hypertension
- Hypovolemia can cause orthostatic hypertension
- Renal arterial stenosis (narrowing of the kidney arteries) with nephroptosis (kidney drops on standing) have been known to cause orthostatic hypertension.
- Aortitis (inflammation of the aorta) with nephroptosis: "This orthostatic hypertension largely may be due to an activation of the renin system caused by nephroptosis and partly due to a reduced baroreflex sensitivity caused by aortitis"
- Pheochromocytoma

== Risks ==
- Blood pressure variability is associated with progression of target organ damage and cardiovascular risk.
- Orthostatic hypertension was positively associated with peripheral arterial disease.
- Increased occurrence of silent cerebrovascular ischemia
- Systolic orthostatic hypertension increases stroke risk.
- Orthostatic hypertension was associated with increased all-cause mortality.

== Diagnosis ==
The blood pressure is first measured after a five-minute wait lying down. Upon standing, blood pressure is measured at one, three and five minutes. The blood pressure at 3 and 5 minutes is averaged. For those unable to stand up for this long, the condition can instead be assessed by a tilt table test.

== Treatments ==
There is no evidence that those with an exaggerated response to standing and normal blood pressure require therapy. However, these individuals may be more likely to develop hypertension later in life.

In patients with hypertensive blood pressure only when standing, blood pressure monitoring over 24 hours may help to assess average blood pressure and test for altered blood pressure patterns over the day. Extreme nighttime blood pressure dipping and masked morning hypertension may be observed in people with orthostatic hypertension. Finally, in individuals with orthostatic hypertension who are also hypertensive while sitting and lying down, antihypertensive medications should be prescribed. However, some antihypertensive medications, particularly diuretics, may exacerbate sympathetic activation with standing and thereby worsen orthostatic hypertension.

Treatment of coexisting conditions, e.g., hypovolemia, also is used. Some specialists in severe cases give saline intravenously for hypovolemia, which, if it is the cause, brings the orthostatic hypertension down to a safe level. Pressure garments over the pelvis and the lower extremities may be used as part of treatment, due to the blood pooling issue occurring in many with the disorder.

== Epidemiology ==
The prevalence of this condition has been studied in various populations. In a study conducted in 1922, it was found that 4.2% of 2000 apparently healthy aviators aged 18 to 42 years had an increase in diastolic blood pressure from below 90 mmHg while in the supine position to above 90 mmHg in the upright posture.

Study which defined orthostatic hypertension as a sustained increase in systolic blood pressure of at least 20 mmHg and/or diastolic blood pressure of at least 10 mmHg within 3 minutes of standing, have reported a prevalence rate of orthostatic hypertension ranging from 5% to 30%. This range is generally consistent with the prevalence of orthostatic hypotension.

== See also ==
- Orthostatic hypotension
- Orthostatic intolerance
