= CST-3056 =

Clinical data
- Other names: CST3056; CuraAX
- Routes of administration: Oral
- Drug class: α_{1}-Adrenergic receptor agonist

CST-3056, also known as CuraAX, is an α_{1A}-adrenergic receptor agonist which is under development for the treatment of neurogenic orthostatic hypotension (nOH) (e.g. due to pure autonomic failure (PAF)), Parkinson's disease, and Alzheimer's disease. It is taken orally.

The drug is a centrally penetrant selective partial agonist of the α_{1A}-adrenergic receptor. nOH frequently occurs in neurodegenerative diseases like Parkinson's disease and Alzheimer's disease and CST-3056 is in part aimed to treat these cases, including to both stabilize blood pressure and improve cerebral perfusion (brain blood flow).

CST-3056 is under development by CuraSen Therapeutics. As of November 2025, it is in phase 2 clinical trials for treatment of orthostatic hypotension and the preclinical research stage of development for Alzheimer's disease. The chemical structure of CST-3056 does not yet appear to have been disclosed.

== See also ==
- List of investigational orthostatic intolerance drugs
