= Dopamine beta hydroxylase deficiency =

- Other names: DβH deficiency
- Dopamine beta hydroxylase is the enzyme responsible for converting dopamine (pictured) to norepinephrine.

Dopamine beta (β)-hydroxylase deficiency is a human medical condition involving inadequate dopamine beta-hydroxylase. It is characterized by increased amounts of serum dopamine and the absence of norepinephrine (NE) and epinephrine.

Dopamine is released, as a false neurotransmitter, in place of norepinephrine (a.k.a. noradrenaline and noradrenalin). This condition is sometimes referred to as "norepinephrine deficiency". Researchers of disorders such as schizophrenia are interested in studying this disorder, as patients with these specific diseases can have an increase in the amount of dopamine in their system and yet do not show other symptoms of DβH deficiency.

Dopamine beta-hydroxylase deficiency is a rare form of dysautonomia. It belongs to the class of rare diseases, with "a prevalence of fewer than 20 affected individuals, all of Western European descent". It is an autosomal recessive disorder caused by a mutation in the DβH gene, which results in the production of a nonfunctional dopamine β-hydroxylase enzyme. Without this enzyme, patients with DβH deficiency develop many clinical manifestations that affect their daily lives.

== Signs and symptoms ==
Dopamine beta (β)-hydroxylase deficiency affects the autonomic nervous system (ANS). The ANS works via two opposing branches, the sympathetic and parasympathetic, both of which antagonistically control involuntary processes that regulate body homeostasis. Problems related to DβH deficiency often appear as complications shortly after birth. Postnatal symptoms may include vomiting, dehydration, hypotension, muscle hypotonia, hypothermia, and hypoglycemia.

Due to the deficiency of norepinephrine and epinephrine, those affected may present with droopy eyelids (ptosis), nasal congestion, and hypotension. The most common complaint is orthostatic hypotension. The symptoms associated with orthostatic hypotension are dizziness, blurred vision, and fainting upon standing. Patients may have difficulty with prolonged standing. This phenomenon is especially pronounced when going from horizontal to upright, such as getting out of bed. It is worsened by hot climates due to loss of fluid through sweating. Difficulty maintaining normal blood pressure makes it difficult to exercise (exercise intolerance). Males may experience retrograde ejaculation, a discharge of semen backward into the bladder due to dysmotility of their smooth muscle, which is innervated by the ANS. A subset of patients present with hypermobility. Postural orthostatic tachycardia syndrome, another form of dysautonomia, also displays this comorbidity with hypermobility in the form of a rare connective tissue disorder called Ehlers Danlos syndrome.

Another commonly experienced symptom is hypoglycemia, which is thought to be caused by adrenomedullary failure. Loss of noradrenergic control is seen as T-wave abnormalities on electrocardiogram. Prolactin is frequently suppressed by excessive dopamine found in the central nervous system. Excess dopamine can also affect digestion, producing vomiting and inhibiting motor signaling to the GI tract.

== Treatment ==
=== Lifestyle ===
Untreated individuals should avoid hot environments, strenuous exercise, prolonged standing and dehydration. Care should be taken when moving from horizontal to upright.

=== Medications ===
L-threo-DOPS is a synthetic precursor of noradrenaline. The conversion of dihydroxyphenylserine (Droxidopa; trade name: Northera; also known as L-DOPS, L-threo-dihydroxyphenylserine, L-threo-DOPS and SM-5688), to norepinephrine bypasses the dopamine beta-hydroxylation step of catecholamine synthesis, L-Threo-DOPS is the preferred therapeutic agent. In humans, L-Threo-DOPS administration has proven effective in managing blood pressure and postural symptoms.

L-DOPS continues to be studied pharmacologically and pharmacokinetically and shows an ability to significantly increase the levels of central nervous system norepinephrine, even though L-DOPS has a relative difficulty crossing the blood-brain barrier when compared to medications such as L-DOPA. Concurrent use increases efficacy, as they are both involved and connected to the norepinephrine synthesis pathway.

L-DOPS may eventually to help other conditions or symptoms such as pain, chronic stroke symptoms, and progressive supranuclear palsy. Clinically, L-DOPS has been reported to be helpful in treating other conditions related to hypotension such as:

- Diabetes induced orthostatic hypotension
- Dialysis-induced hypotension
- Orthostatic intolerance
- Familial amyloidotic polyneuropathy
- Spinal Cord Injury related hypotension

Empirical evidence of mild effectiveness has been reported using mineralocorticoids or adrenergic receptor agonists as therapies.

Other medications that can bring relief to symptoms include:

- phenylpropanolamine- due to pressor response to vascular α-adrenoceptors
- indomethacin

Vitamin C (ascorbic acid) is a required cofactor for the Dopamine beta hydroxylase enzyme. Vitamin C rapidly catalyzes the conversion of dopamine to norepinephrine through stimulation of dopamine beta hydroxylase.

== Prognosis ==
This is a form of dysautonomia distinct from familial dysautonomia because of its lack of familial dysautonomic symptoms such as loss of sense of pain and smell. L-threo-DOPS has been described as being "very effective for restoring noradrenergic tone and correcting postural hypotension, response to treatment is variable and the long-term and functional outcome is unknown."

== Research ==
Researchers have gathered retrospective data collections in order to better under the progression of this orphan disease. Most studies show a perinatal period marked by inadequacy of the ANS to control blood pressure, blood sugar, and body temperature. The experiences of orthostatic hypotension, exercise intolerance, and "traumatic morbidity related to falls and syncope" have been documented later in lives of people with this condition. To provide a basis for improving the epidemiology, genotype/phenotype correlation, outcome of these diseases, their impact on the quality of life of patients, and for evaluating diagnostic and therapeutic strategies, a patient registry was established by the non-commercial International Working Group on Neurotransmitter Related Disorders (iNTD).

Studies have explored the connection between DβH deficiency, Droxidopa treatment, and the effect on orthostatic tolerance and glucose homeostasis. It was reported that Droxidopa increased acute and late glucose-stimulated insulin secretion and improved patients' insulin sensitivity. However, the use of Droxidopa was found to produce only "modest changes in glucose homeostasis". This shows that treatment modalities other than Droxidopa should be pursued as possible adjuncts for the hyperinsulinemia seen in DβH deficiency.
