= Primary autonomic failure =

Primary autonomic failure (also called primary dysautonomia) refers to a category of dysautonomias — conditions in which the autonomic nervous system does not function properly.

In primary dysautonomias, the autonomic dysfunction occurs as a primary condition (as opposed to resulting from another disease). Autonomic failure is categorized as "primary" when believed to result from a chronic condition characterized by degeneration of the autonomic nervous system, or where autonomic failure is the predominant symptom and its cause is unknown.

Such "primary" dysautonomias are distinguished from secondary dysautonomias, where the dysfunction of the autonomic nervous system is believed to be caused by another disease (e.g. diabetes).

Diseases categorized as primary autonomic failure usually include pure autonomic failure and multiple system atrophy. Many scientists also categorize Parkinson disease and familial dysautonomia as "primary".
