= Autoimmune autonomic ganglionopathy =

- Other names: Autoimmune autonomic neuropathy, Acute pandysautonomia
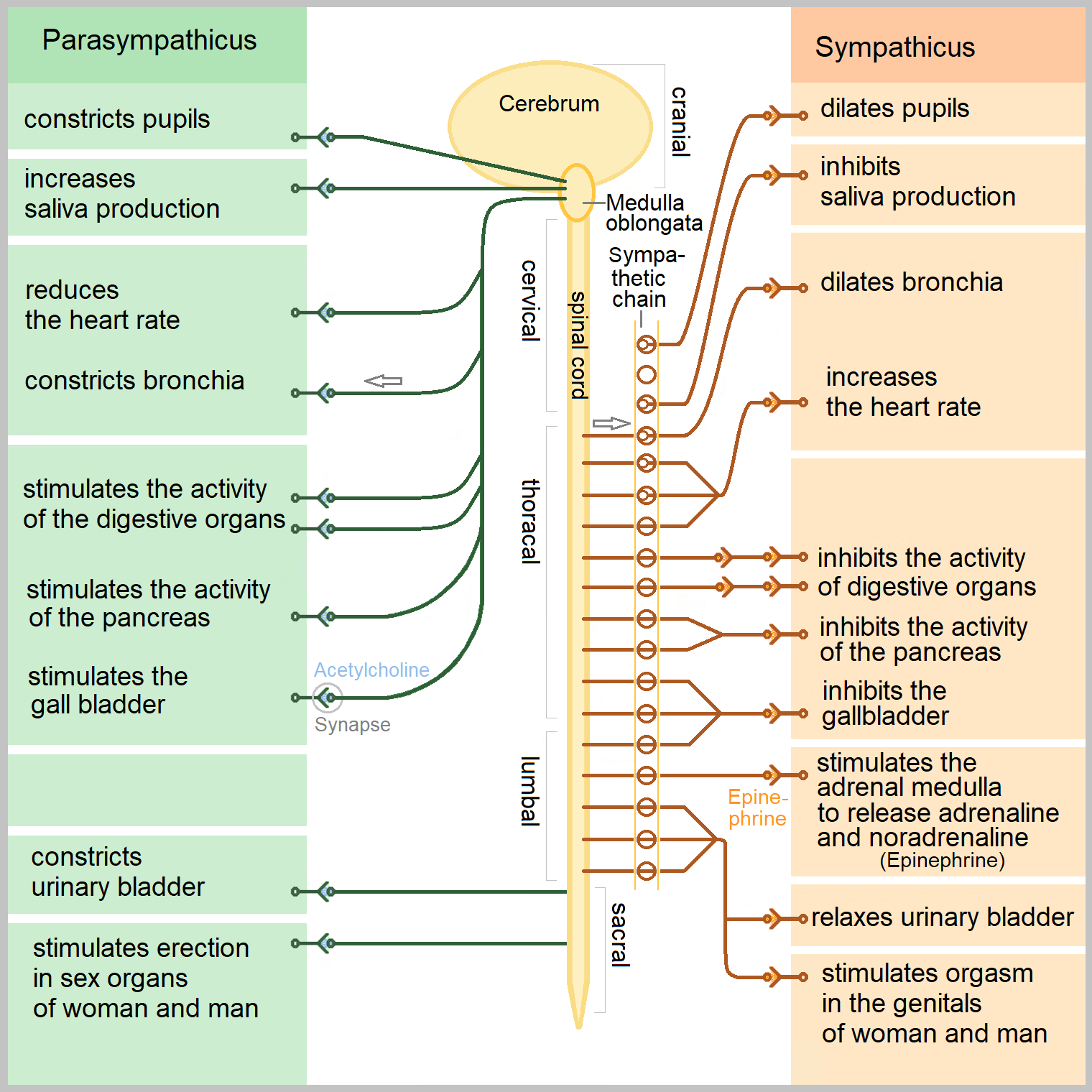
- Functions of the autonomic nervous system.
- Specialty: Neurology
- Symptoms: Gastrointestinal dysmotility, orthostatic hypotension, and tonic pupils.
- Complications: Weight loss.
- Diagnostic method: Clinical criteria and serum ganglionic neuronal nicotinic AChR antibodies.
- Differential diagnosis: Paraneoplastic syndrome, Guillain-Barré syndrome, diabetes, amyloidosis, Sjogren's syndrome, and Morvan syndrome.

Autoimmune autonomic ganglionopathy is a type of immune-mediated autonomic failure that is associated with antibodies against the ganglionic nicotinic acetylcholine receptor present in sympathetic, parasympathetic, and enteric ganglia. Typical symptoms include gastrointestinal dysmotility, orthostatic hypotension, and tonic pupils. Many cases have a sudden onset, but others worsen over time, resembling degenerative forms of autonomic dysfunction. For milder cases, supportive treatment is used to manage symptoms. Plasma exchange, intravenous immunoglobulin, corticosteroids, or immunosuppression have been used successfully to treat more severe cases.

== Signs and symptoms ==
Individuals symptoms vary in severity and type. Severe, subacute gastrointestinal dysmotility and orthostatic hypotension are the most common symptoms in two-thirds of patients. Symptoms can be severe in some cases and gradually worsen in others.

Sympathetic failure manifests itself as orthostatic hypotension and anhidrosis. Orthostatic symptoms, which include lightheadedness, dizziness, or syncope upon standing and loss of postural reflex tachycardia, occur in 78% of patients.

Dry eyes and mouth are symptoms of parasympathetic failure caused by secretomotor dysfunction. Additional symptoms of the parasympathetic nervous system include constipation, light sensitivity, impotence, and retention of urine. A minimal change in heart rate during deep breathing, or the Valsalva maneuver, and resting tachycardia may occur when the heart's cardiovagal control fails.

Constipation or diarrhea, emesis, anorexia, early satiety, and abdominal pain are common symptoms of gastrointestinal dysmotility, which affects 70% of patients.

Although about a quarter of patients report neuropathic symptoms such as tingling in the distal extremities, sensory examination and nerve conduction studies are normal.

=== Complications ===
In severe cases, intestinal pseudo-obstruction can result in death. Patients frequently lose weight as a result of their decreased ability to maintain nutrition.

== Causes ==
The cause is generally a paraneoplastic syndrome, autoimmune, or idiopathic. It is thought that the body's own immune system targets receptors in the autonomic ganglia, such as the alpha-3 (α3) or beta-4 (β4) of the ganglionic nicotinic acetylcholine receptor (gAChR), which is part of a peripheral nerve fiber. If the AAG is paraneoplastic, there is an underlying presence of cancer, and their immune system has produced paraneoplastic antibodies in response to the cancer.

== Pathophysiology ==
Antibodies against the neuronal nicotinic acetylcholine receptor found in autonomic ganglia are present in approximately 50% of AAG patients. The ganglionic AChR, which is homologous but genetically and immunologically distinct from the AChR at the neuromuscular junction, mediates fast synaptic transmission in all autonomic ganglia.

Several lines of evidence have shown that 3 gAChR antibodies are pathogenic in AAG. In vitro, IgG from AAG patients reduces gAChR current in cultured neuroblastoma cells. Mice with genetically engineered null mutations in the 3 subunit have reduced autonomic ganglionic transmission, resulting in urinary retention, dilated and nonreactive pupils, and higher mortality rates. Active immunization of rabbits against the 3 subunit results in gastrointestinal hypomotility, urinary retention, and a reduced number of gACh receptors on postsynaptic ganglionic neurons, as well as impaired synaptic transmission.

== Diagnosis ==
After ruling out other etiologies, the diagnosis of AAG is made based on clinical indicators. In as many as 50% of individuals with classic AAG symptoms, serum ganglionic neuronal nicotinic AChR antibodies are detected. A negative test does not rule out the diagnosis; however, a positive blood AChR antibody is specific for AAG. When a patient has subacute, severe symptoms or has cancer risk factors, screening computed tomography of the chest is indicated. Some individuals with paraneoplastic autonomic neuropathy have ganglionic AChR antibodies, therefore occult small cell carcinoma or thymoma should be explored.

=== Differential diagnosis ===
The most common differential diagnosis is paraneoplastic autonomic neuropathy, which can mimic AAG symptoms. Orthostatic hypotension and significant gastrointestinal symptoms are also hallmarks of paraneoplastic dysautonomia. Paraneoplastic dysautonomia has been linked to thymoma, small-cell lung carcinoma, and, less frequently, breast cancer or lymphoma. At the time of the development of autonomic symptoms, the underlying malignancy is usually unknown. Antibody testing, such as anti-Hu or collapsing response mediator protein, can aid in the identification of paraneoplastic patients.

One should rule out Guillain-Barré syndrome if the patient exhibits acute or subacute autonomic instability accompanied by weakness, as this condition frequently results in ileus, constipation, and blood pressure swings. If, on the other hand, the patient has autonomic overactivity with muscle stiffness and spontaneous muscle twitching, an autoimmune neuromyotonia or Morvan syndrome diagnosis may be considered.

Chronic and progressive onset of autonomic symptoms may indicate diabetes, amyloidosis, or Sjogren's syndrome. AAG can be difficult to distinguish from degenerative autonomic disorders such as pure autonomic failure or multiple system atrophy when autonomic symptoms appear gradually. When the time course is unknown, the presence of prominent gastrointestinal dysmotility and impaired pupillary light reflexes should point to AAG.

== Treatment ==
Where an underlying neoplasm is the cause, treatment of this condition is indicated to reduce progression of symptoms. For cases without a known cause, treatment involves suppression of the immune system with corticosteroid treatment, intravenous immunoglobulin, immunosuppressive agents like rituximab, mycophenolate mofetil (Cellcept), or azathioprine (Imuran) or plasmapheresis.

== Outlook ==
The ganglionic AChR antibody level in AAG patients corresponds with the degree of severity of autonomic signs and symptoms. Patients with high levels of ganglionic AChR antibodies frequently appear with subacute onset and significant cholinergic dysautonomia.

== See also ==
- Myasthenia gravis
- Dysautonomia
- Postural orthostatic tachycardia syndrome
- Multiple system atrophy
