= Orthostatic intolerance =

Development of symptoms when standing

Orthostatic intolerance (OI) is the development of symptoms when standing upright that are relieved when reclining. There are many types of orthostatic intolerance. OI can be a subcategory of dysautonomia, a disorder of the autonomic nervous system occurring when an individual stands up. Some animal species with orthostatic hypotension have evolved to cope with orthostatic disturbances.

A substantial overlap is seen between syndromes of orthostatic intolerance on the one hand, and either chronic fatigue syndrome or fibromyalgia on the other. It affects more women than men (female-to-male ratio is at least 4:1), usually under the age of 35. OI can also be a symptom of mitochondrial cytopathy.

Orthostatic intolerance occurs in humans because standing upright is a fundamental stressor, so requires rapid and effective circulatory and neurologic compensations to maintain blood pressure, cerebral blood flow, and consciousness. When a human stands, about 750 ml of thoracic blood are abruptly translocated downward. People who have OI lack the basic mechanisms to compensate for this deficit. Changes in heart rate, blood pressure, and cerebral blood flow that produce OI may be caused by abnormalities in the interactions between blood volume control, the cardiovascular system, the nervous system, and circulation control system.

== Signs and symptoms ==
Orthostatic intolerance can be classified as acute OI and chronic OI.

=== Acute orthostatic intolerance ===
Patients who have acute OI usually manifest the disorder by a temporary loss of consciousness and posture, with rapid recovery (simple faints, or syncope), as well as remaining conscious during their loss of posture. This is different from a syncope caused by cardiac problems because the triggers for the fainting spell (standing, heat, emotion) and identifiable prodromal symptoms (nausea, blurred vision, headache) are known. As Dr. Julian M. Stewart, an expert in OI from New York Medical College states, "Many syncopal patients have no intercurrent illness; between faints, they are well."

Symptoms:

- Altered vision (blurred vision, "white outs"/gray outs, black outs, double vision)
- Anxiety
- Exercise intolerance
- Fatigue
- Headache
- Heart palpitations, as the heart races to compensate for the falling blood pressure
- Hyperpnea or sensation of difficulty breathing or swallowing (see also hyperventilation syndrome)
- Lightheadedness
- Sweating
- Tremulousness
- Weakness

A classic manifestation of acute OI is a soldier who faints after standing rigidly at attention for an extended period of time.

=== Chronic orthostatic intolerance ===
Patients with chronic orthostatic intolerance have symptoms on most or all days. Their symptoms may include most of the symptoms of acute OI, plus:

- Nausea
- Neurocognitive deficits, such as attention problems
- Pallor
- Sensitivity to heat
- Sleep problems
- Other vasomotor symptoms

== Triggers ==
Symptoms of OI are triggered by:

- An upright posture for long periods (e.g. standing in line, standing in a shower, or even sitting at a desk)
- A warm environment (e.g. hot summer weather, a hot crowded room, a hot shower or bath, after exercise)
- Emotionally stressful events (seeing blood or gory scenes, being scared or anxious)
- Return from an extended stay in space, when the body is not yet readapted to gravity
- Extended bedrest
- Inadequate fluid and salt intake
- Concussion

== Diagnosis ==
Many patients go undiagnosed or misdiagnosed and either untreated or treated for other disorders. Current tests for OI (tilt table test, NASA Lean Test, adapted Autonomic Profile (aAP), autonomic assessment, and vascular integrity) can also specify and simplify treatment. Patients with dysautonomia symptoms can be referred to a cardiologist, neurologist, or even a gastroenterologist for treatment and management.

== Management ==
Most patients experience an improvement of their symptoms, but for some, OI can be gravely disabling and can be progressive in nature, particularly if it is caused by an underlying condition that is deteriorating. The ways in which symptoms present themselves vary greatly from patient to patient; as a result, individualized treatment plans are necessary.

OI is treated pharmacologically and non-pharmacologically. Treatment does not cure OI; rather, it controls symptoms.

Physicians who specialize in treating OI agree that the single most important treatment is drinking more than 2 liters (8 cups) of fluids each day. A steady, large supply of water or other fluids reduces most, and for some patients all, of the major symptoms of this condition. Typically, patients fare best when they drink a glass of water no less frequently than every two hours during the day, instead of drinking a large quantity of water at a single point in the day.

For most severe cases and some milder cases, a combination of medications is used. Individual responses to different medications vary widely, and a drug that dramatically improves one patient's symptoms may make another patient's symptoms much worse. Medications focus on three main issues:

Medications that increase blood volume:

- Fludrocortisone (Florinef)
- Erythropoietin
- Hormonal contraception

Medications that inhibit acetylcholinesterase:

- Pyridostigmine

Medications that improve vasoconstriction:

- Stimulants: (e.g., Ritalin or Dexedrine)
- Midodrine (ProAmatine)
- Ephedrine and pseudoephedrine (Sudafed)
- Theophylline (low-dose)
- Selective serotonin reuptake inhibitors (SSRIs - Prozac, Zoloft, and Paxil)

Behavioral changes that patients with OI can make are:

- Avoiding triggers such as prolonged sitting, quiet standing, warm environments, or vasodilating medications
- Using postural maneuvers and pressure garments
- Treating co-existing medical conditions
- Increasing fluid and salt intake
- Physical therapy and exercise

== Notable case ==
A notable person with OI is Greg Page, founding member and original lead singer of the Australian children's music group The Wiggles. Due to being diagnosed with this illness, Page left the group in late 2006, and was replaced by his understudy, Sam Moran. Two years later in late 2008, he went on to create his own fund for OI to help fund research into this then-little known disorder. Page recovered enough to temporarily return to The Wiggles in early 2012 to help with the transition to the next generation of Wiggles, after which he again left the group at the end of 2012 and was replaced by Emma Watkins.

== See also ==
- List of investigational orthostatic intolerance drugs
- Orthostatic hypertension
- Orthostatic hypotension
- Postural orthostatic tachycardia syndrome (POTS)
- Vasovagal response
