= Autonomic neuropathy =

- Specialty: Neurology

Autonomic neuropathy (AN or AAN) is a form of polyneuropathy that affects the non-voluntary, non-sensory nervous system (i.e., the autonomic nervous system), affecting mostly the internal organs such as the bladder muscles, the cardiovascular system, the digestive tract, and the genital organs. These nerves are not under a person's conscious control and function automatically. Autonomic nerve fibers form large collections in the thorax, abdomen, and pelvis outside the spinal cord. They have connections with the spinal cord and ultimately the brain, however. Most commonly autonomic neuropathy is seen in persons with long-standing diabetes mellitus types 1 and 2. In most—but not all—cases, autonomic neuropathy occurs alongside other forms of neuropathy, such as sensory neuropathy.

Autonomic neuropathy is one cause of malfunction of the autonomic nervous system (referred to as dysautonomia), but not the only one; some conditions affecting the brain or spinal cord also may cause autonomic dysfunction, such as multiple system atrophy, and therefore, may cause similar symptoms to autonomic neuropathy.

== Signs and symptoms ==
The signs and symptoms of autonomic neuropathy include the following:

- Urinary bladder conditions: urinary incontinence or urinary retention which happens due to the uncoordinated contraction of the bladder. Neurogenic bladder is a broad term describing this dysfunction.
- Gastrointestinal tract: dysphagia, abdominal pain, nausea, vomiting, malabsorption, fecal incontinence, gastroparesis, diarrhea, constipation
- Cardiovascular system: disturbances of heart rate (tachycardia, bradycardia), orthostatic hypotension, inadequate increase of heart rate on exertion
- Respiratory system: impairments in the signals associated with regulation of breathing and gas exchange (central sleep apnea, hypopnea, bradypnea).
- Nervous system: pupillary defect, exaggerated hippus, dizziness or lightheadedness.
- Other areas: hypoglycemia unawareness, genital impotence, sweat disturbances, sicca (dryness).
- Absence of signs of cerebellar dysfunction, cognitive decline, or parkinsonian symptoms, as the presence of these would indicate the more serious diseases multiple system atrophy or lewy body dementia.

== Causes ==
Many health conditions can cause autonomic neuropathy. Some common causes of autonomic neuropathy include:

- Diabetes, which is the most common cause of autonomic neuropathy, can gradually cause nerve damage throughout the body.
- Vitamin B_{12} deficiency (pernicious anemia)
- Injury to nerves caused by surgery or radiation to the neck.
- Treatment with certain medications, including some drugs used in cancer chemotherapy.
- Abnormal protein buildup in organs (amyloidosis), which affects the organs and the nervous system.
- An abnormal attack by the immune system (autoimmune autonomic ganglionopathy), sometimes as part of a paraneoplastic syndrome which can occur even when cancer has not yet been diagnosed.
- Certain infectious diseases. Some viruses and bacteria, such as botulism, Lyme disease and HIV, can cause autonomic neuropathy.
- Inherited disorders. Certain hereditary disorders can cause autonomic neuropathy.
- Autoimmune diseases, in which the immune system attacks and damages parts of the body, including the nerves. Examples include Sjögren's disease, systemic lupus erythematosus, rheumatoid arthritis and celiac disease. Guillain–Barré syndrome is an autoimmune disease that happens rapidly and can affect autonomic nerves.

== Treatment ==
=== Neurogenic bladder ===
Depending on the symptoms and severity of the neurogenic bladder dysfunction, the doctor might suggest one of the following treatments

- Behavioral changes: such as reducing water intake, kegel exercises, biofeedback training
- Clean intermittent catheterization: insertion of a foley catheter to remove the urine every few hours and prevent retention, done in a sterile manner.
- Pharmacological therapy, which includes anticholinergic drugs which reduce the contraction of the bladder
- Botox injections into the bladder
- Surgical treatment: Urinary diversion, Artificial Urinary Sphincter, Urethral sling, or insertion of electrical devices adjacent to the bladder to stimulate its contraction.
