= Nepicastat =

Chemical compound

Clinical data
- Other names: SYN-117; SYN117; RS-25560-197
- Drug class: Dopamine β-hydroxylase inhibitor

Identifiers
- IUPAC name: 5-(Aminomethyl)-1-[(2S)-5,7-difluoro-1,2,3,4-tetrahydronaphthalen-2-yl]-1,3-dihydro-2H-imidazole-2-thione
- CAS Number: 173997-05-2
- PubChem CID: 9796181
- IUPHAR/BPS: 6630
- ChemSpider: 7971947
- UNII: VPG12K4540
- ChEBI: CHEBI:139334
- CompTox Dashboard (EPA): DTXSID80169740

Chemical and physical data
- Formula: C_{14}H_{15}F_{2}N_{3}S
- Molar mass: 295.35 g·mol^{−1}
- 3D model (JSmol): Interactive image
- SMILES: Fc1cc3c(c(F)c1)CC[C@H](N2/C(=C\NC2=S)CN)C3
- InChI: InChI=1S/C14H15F2N3S/c15-9-3-8-4-10(1-2-12(8)13(16)5-9)19-11(6-17)7-18-14(19)20/h3,5,7,10H,1-2,4,6,17H2,(H,18,20)/t10-/m0/s1; Key:YZZVIKDAOTXDEB-JTQLQIEISA-N

Nepicastat (INN; developmental code names SYN117, RS-25560-197) is an inhibitor of dopamine β-hydroxylase (DBH), an enzyme that catalyzes the conversion of dopamine to norepinephrine.

It has been studied as a possible treatment for congestive heart failure, and appears to be well tolerated as such. As of 2012, clinical trials to assess nepicastat as a treatment for post-traumatic stress disorder (PTSD) and cocaine dependence have been completed. In Phase 2 study treatment with nepicastat was not effective in relieving PTSD-associated symptoms when compared to placebo. The study was funded by the U.S. Department of Defense. As of October 2024, development has been discontinued for most indications.

Mice lacking epinephrine exhibit reduced contextual memory after fear conditioning . In addition, in PTSD epinephrine enhances traumatic contextual memory. Studies indicate that nepicastat effectively reduces norepinephrine in both peripheral and central tissues in rats and dogs. Nepicastat also upregulates the transcription Npas4 and Bdnf genes in the mice hippocampus potentially contributing to neuronal regulation and the attenuation of traumatic contextual memories No DBH inhibitor has received marketing approval due to poor DBH selectivity, low potency and side effects, however DBH gene silencing may be an alternative for patients with heightened sympathetic activity. Some studies, however have shown that nepicastat is well-tolerated in healthy adults and no significant differences in adverse events were observed. Given that nepicastat treatment has been proven to be effective in reducing signs in an PTSD mouse model with increased catecholamine levels, it could be a promising treatment option for humans with PTSD characterized by increased catecholamine plasma levels.

== See also ==
- Disulfiram
- Etamicastat
- Zamicastat
