= Etamicastat =

Abandoned cardiovascular drug

Clinical data
- Other names: BIA 5-453; BIA-5-453
- Drug class: Dopamine β-hydroxylase inhibitor

Identifiers
- IUPAC name: 4-(2-aminoethyl)-3-[(3R)-6,8-difluoro-3,4-dihydro-2H-chromen-3-yl]-1H-imidazole-2-thione
- CAS Number: 760173-05-5
- PubChem CID: 10450387
- DrugBank: DB15288
- ChemSpider: 8625804
- UNII: 9X96V6DBU4
- ChEMBL: ChEMBL1196088
- CompTox Dashboard (EPA): DTXSID00226940

Chemical and physical data
- Formula: C_{14}H_{15}F_{2}N_{3}OS
- Molar mass: 311.35 g·mol^{−1}
- 3D model (JSmol): Interactive image
- SMILES: C1[C@H](COC2=C1C=C(C=C2F)F)N3C(=CNC3=S)CCN
- InChI: InChI=1S/C14H15F2N3OS/c15-9-3-8-4-11(7-20-13(8)12(16)5-9)19-10(1-2-17)6-18-14(19)21/h3,5-6,11H,1-2,4,7,17H2,(H,18,21)/t11-/m1/s1; Key:CWWWTTYMUOYSQA-LLVKDONJSA-N

Etamicastat (INN; developmental code name BIA 5-453) is a peripherally selective dopamine β-hydroxylase (DBH) inhibitor which was under development for the treatment of hypertension (high blood pressure) and heart failure but was never marketed. The peripheral selectivity of etamicastat is in contrast to the earlier DBH inhibitor nepicastat, which is centrally active and produced associated side effects. Etamicastat was found to reduce blood pressure but not affect heart rate in clinical trials. The development of etamicastat was discontinued by August 2016.

== See also ==
- Nepicastat
- Zamicastat
