= List of investigational orthostatic intolerance drugs =

Investigational PMS/PMDD drugs

This is a list of investigational orthostatic intolerance drugs, or drugs that are currently under development for clinical use for the treatment of orthostatic intolerance (OI) but are not yet approved. Some examples of such conditions include orthostatic hypotension (OH), postural orthostatic tachycardia syndrome (POTS), and dysautonomia. These conditions have multiple different subtypes and corresponding treatments.

Chemical/generic names are listed first, with developmental code names, synonyms, and brand names in parentheses. The format of list items is "Name (Synonyms) – Mechanism of Action – Indication [Reference]".

This list was last comprehensively updated in March 2026. It is likely to become outdated with time.

== Under development ==
=== Phase 3 ===
- Ampreloxetine (TD-9855; TD9855) – norepinephrine reuptake inhibitor (NRI) – orthostatic hypotension
- Immune globulin (Beriglobin P; Berirab P; Carimune NF; Gamma Venin P; Hizentra; human immunoglobulin G; IgNextGen 10%; IgPro10; IgPro20; IVIG 10%; Privigen; Redimune; Redimune NF; Rhesogamma P; Rhophylac; Sandoglobulin; Sandoglobulin NF; ScIG; Subcutaneous immunoglobulin; Tetagam P; Varicellon; Venimmun N; Vivaglobin) – immunoglobulin and immunostimulant – postural orthostatic tachycardia syndrome (POTS)

=== Phase 2 ===
- CST-3056 (CuraAX) – α_{1}-adrenergic receptor agonist – orthostatic hypotension
- REGN-7544 (REGN7544) – monoclonal antibody against [atrial] natriuretic peptide receptor 1 (NPR1) – postural orthostatic tachycardia syndrome (POTS)

=== Phase 1 ===
- CST-2140 – α_{1}-adrenergic receptor agonist – orthostatic hypotension

=== Preclinical ===
- POTS(Antag) – undefined mechanism of action (synthetic peptide) – postural orthostatic tachycardia syndrome (POTS)

== Not under development ==
=== No development reported ===
- Rislenemdaz (AVTX-301; CERC-301; CERC301; MK-0657) – NR2B subunit-selective NMDA receptor antagonist – orthostatic hypotension

=== Discontinued ===
- Efgartigimod alfa (ARGX-113; EFG-PH20-SC; PH20-SC; Vydura; Vygart) – antibody fragment against Neonatal Fc receptor – postural orthostatic tachycardia syndrome (POTS)

== Clinically used drugs ==
=== Approved drugs ===
- Amezinium metilsulfate (Regulton) – non-selective adrenergic receptor agonist and norepinephrine reuptake inhibitor (NRI) – orthostatic hypotension
- Droxidopa (L-DOPS; Northera) – non-selective adrenergic receptor agonist (norepinephrine prodrug) – orthostatic hypotension
- Midodrine (Amatine; Gudon; Gutron; Metligine; Midon; ProAmatine; ST-1085; TS-701) – α_{1}-adrenergic receptor agonist (desglymidodrine prodrug) – orthostatic hypotension

=== Off-label drugs ===
- α_{1}-Adrenergic receptor agonists (e.g., midodrine, phenylephrine, norfenefrine)
- α_{2}-Adrenergic receptor agonists (e.g., clonidine, methyldopa)
- α_{2}-Adrenergic receptor antagonists (e.g., yohimbine)
- Beta blockers (β-adrenergic receptor antagonists) (e.g., propranolol, metoprolol, labetalol, bisoprolol)
- Desmopressin (Ddavp) – vasopressin receptor agonist
- Droxidopa (L-DOPS; Northera) – non-selective adrenergic receptor agonist (norepinephrine prodrug)
- Erythropoietin – erythropoietin receptor agonist
- Fludrocortisone – mineralocorticoid (mineralocorticoid receptor agonist)
- Ivabradine – hyperpolarization-activated cyclic nucleotide-gated channel HCN4 blocker
- Non-selective adrenergic receptor agonists (e.g., intravenous norepinephrine) (severe and refractory cases)
- Norepinephrine and/or dopamine releasing agents and reuptake inhibitors (indirectly acting sympathomimetics and/or stimulants) (e.g., amphetamines, ephedrine, pseudoephedrine, phenylpropanolamine, oxilofrine, methylphenidate, bupropion, atomoxetine, modafinil)
- Octreotide – somatostatin receptor agonist
- Pyridostigmine (Mestinon) – acetylcholinesterase inhibitor and parasympathomimetic

== See also ==
- List of investigational drugs
