= Zamicastat =

Experimental cardiovascular drug

Clinical data
- Other names: BIA-5-1058; BIA 5-1058
- Drug class: Dopamine β-hydroxylase inhibitor

Identifiers
- IUPAC name: 4-[2-(benzylamino)ethyl]-3-[(3R)-6,8-difluoro-3,4-dihydro-2H-chromen-3-yl]-1H-imidazole-2-thione
- CAS Number: 1080028-80-3
- PubChem CID: 25052630
- DrugBank: DB12389
- ChemSpider: 32701723
- UNII: YLU32D0DNV
- ChEMBL: ChEMBL4594440
- CompTox Dashboard (EPA): DTXSID80148358

Chemical and physical data
- Formula: C_{21}H_{21}F_{2}N_{3}OS
- Molar mass: 401.48 g·mol^{−1}
- 3D model (JSmol): Interactive image
- SMILES: C1[C@H](COC2=C1C=C(C=C2F)F)N3C(=CNC3=S)CCNCC4=CC=CC=C4
- InChI: InChI=1S/C21H21F2N3OS/c22-16-8-15-9-18(13-27-20(15)19(23)10-16)26-17(12-25-21(26)28)6-7-24-11-14-4-2-1-3-5-14/h1-5,8,10,12,18,24H,6-7,9,11,13H2,(H,25,28)/t18-/m1/s1; Key:ZSSLCFLHEFXANG-GOSISDBHSA-N

Zamicastat (INN; developmental code name BIA-5-1058) is a peripherally selective dopamine β-hydroxylase (DBH) inhibitor which is under development for the treatment of pulmonary arterial hypertension (PAH) and heart failure. It is structurally related to etamicastat and is said to be an improved version of this drug. As of July 2022, zamicastat is in phase 2 clinical trials for PAH and phase 1 clinical trials for heart failure. However, no recent development has been reported for heart failure.

== See also ==
- Nepicastat
