= Dopamine beta-hydroxylase =

Mammalian protein found in Homo sapiens

DBH
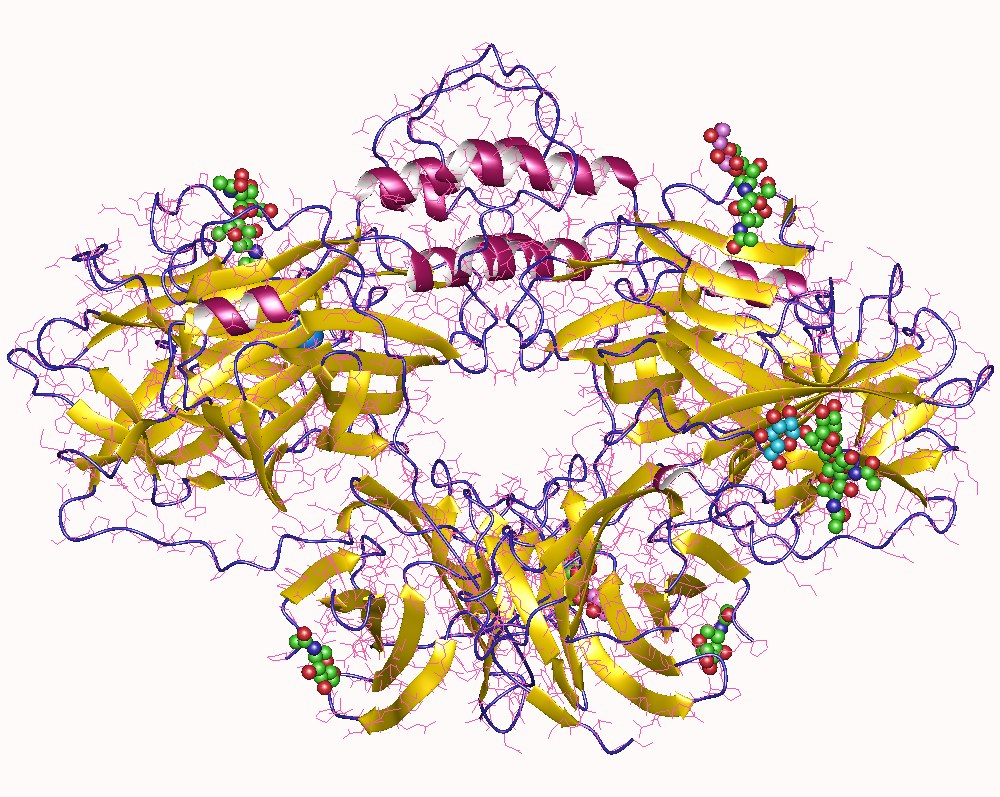

Identifiers
- Aliases: DBH, DBM, Dopamine beta-monooxygenase, dopamine beta-hydroxylase, Dopamine β-hydroxylase, ORTHYP1
- External IDs: OMIM: 609312; MGI: 94864; GeneCards: DBH
Available structures
PDB	Ortholog search: PDBe RCSB
PDB	List of PDB id codes 4ZEL
Enzyme activity
EC #	BRENDA	ExPASy	KEGG	MetaCyc
1.14.17.1	↗	↗	↗	↗

Gene location (Human)
Chr.	Chromosome 9 (human)
Band	9q34.2	Start	133,636,363 bp
Band	9q34.2	End	133,659,329 bp

Gene location (Mouse)
Chr.	Chromosome 2 (mouse)
Band	2 A3|2 19.29 cM	Start	27,055,245 bp
Band	2 A3|2 19.29 cM	End	27,073,212 bp
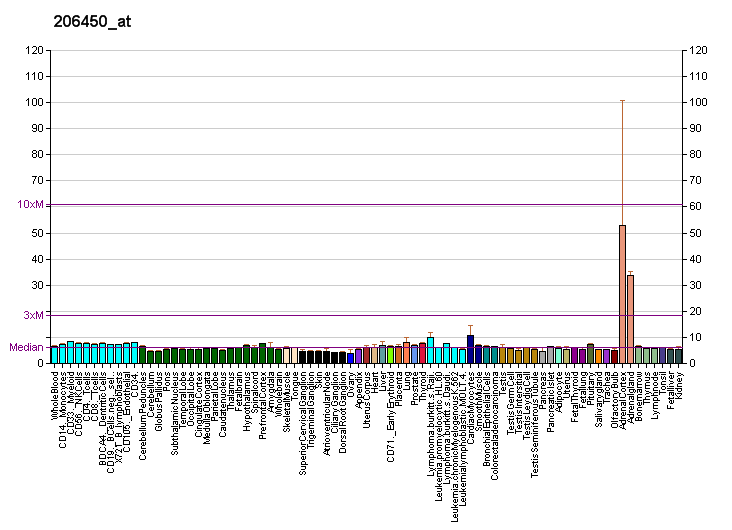
RNA expression pattern
Bgee	Human / Mouse (ortholog); Top expressed in: right lobe of liver; right adrenal gland; left adrenal gland; left adrenal cortex; sympathetic trunk; superior vestibular nucleus; right adrenal cortex; lymph node; body of pancreas; granulocyte / Top expressed in: superior cervical ganglion; adrenal gland; external carotid artery; tunica adventitia of aorta; parasympathetic nervous system; carotid body; submandibular gland; parasympathetic ganglion; myocardium of ventricle; secondary oocyte; More reference expression data
BioGPS	More reference expression data
Gene ontology
Molecular function	metal ion binding; monooxygenase activity; oxidoreductase activity; oxidoreductase activity, acting on paired donors, with incorporation or reduction of molecular oxygen, reduced ascorbate as one donor, and incorporation of one atom of oxygen; L-ascorbic acid binding; catalytic activity; dopamine beta-monooxygenase activity; copper ion binding
Cellular component	cytoplasm; transport vesicle membrane; integral component of membrane; chromaffin granule lumen; chromaffin granule membrane; cytoplasmic vesicle; membrane; extracellular region; extracellular space; secretory granule membrane; secretory granule lumen; intracellular membrane-bounded organelle; endoplasmic reticulum; microtubule organizing center
Biological process	response to amphetamine; chemical synaptic transmission; homoiothermy; leukocyte mediated immunity; visual learning; fear response; behavioral response to ethanol; locomotory behavior; regulation of extrinsic apoptotic signaling pathway; regulation of cell population proliferation; positive regulation of vasoconstriction; glucose homeostasis; maternal behavior; memory; leukocyte migration; response to pain; blood vessel remodeling; cytokine production; associative learning; catecholamine biosynthetic process; dopamine catabolic process; norepinephrine biosynthetic process; octopamine biosynthetic process; positive regulation of cold-induced thermogenesis
Sources:Amigo / QuickGO
Orthologs
Databases	NCBI: entry; OMA: entry
Species	Human	Mouse
Entrez	1621	13166
Ensembl	ENSG00000123454	ENSMUSG00000000889
UniProt	P09172	Q64237
RefSeq (mRNA)	NM_000787	NM_138942
RefSeq (protein)	NP_000778	NP_620392
Location (UCSC)	Chr 9: 133.64 – 133.66 Mb	Chr 2: 27.06 – 27.07 Mb
PubMed search
- Wikidata
View/Edit Human	View/Edit Mouse

dopamine β-monooxygenase

Identifiers
- EC no.: 1.14.17.1
- CAS no.: 9013-38-1

Databases
- BRENDA: enzyme data
- ExPASy: NiceZyme view
- KEGG: enzyme entry
- MetaCyc: metabolic pathway
- Rhea: reactions
- PDB structures: RCSB PDB PDBe PDBsum
- Gene Ontology: AmiGO / QuickGO
Search
- PMC: articles
- PubMed: articles
- NCBI: proteins

Dopamine β-hydroxylase (DBH), also known as dopamine β-monooxygenase, is an enzyme (EC 1.14.17.1) that in humans is encoded by the DBH gene. Dopamine β-hydroxylase catalyzes the conversion of dopamine to norepinephrine.

Dopamine is converted to norepinephrine by the enzyme dopamine β-hydroxylase; ascorbic acid serves as a cofactor.

The three substrates of the enzyme are dopamine, vitamin C (ascorbate), and O_{2}. The products are norepinephrine, dehydroascorbate, and H_{2}O.

DBH is a 290-kDa copper-containing oxygenase consisting of four identical subunits, and its activity requires ascorbate as a cofactor.

It is the only enzyme involved in the synthesis of small-molecule neurotransmitters that is membrane-bound, making norepinephrine the only known transmitter synthesized inside vesicles. It is expressed in noradrenergic neurons of the central nervous system (i.e., locus coeruleus) and peripheral nervous systems (i.e., sympathetic ganglia), as well as in chromaffin cells of the adrenal medulla.

== Mechanism of catalysis ==
Based on the observations of what happens when there is no substrate, or oxygen, the following steps seem to constitute the hydroxylation reaction.

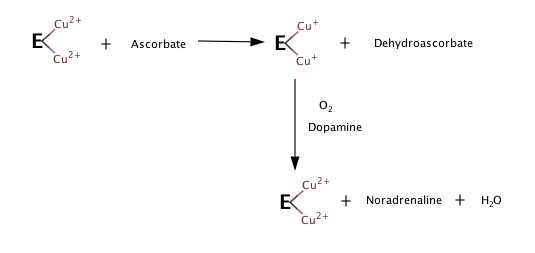
In the absence of oxygen, dopamine or other substrates, the enzyme and ascorbate mixture produces reduced enzyme and dehydroascorbate. Exposing the reduced enzyme to oxygen and dopamine results in oxidation of the enzyme and formation of noradrenaline and water, and this step doesn't require ascorbate.

Although details of DBH mechanism are yet to be confirmed, DBH is homologous to another enzyme, peptidylglycine α-hydroxylating monooxygenase (PHM). Because DBH and PHM share similar structures, it is possible to model DBH mechanism based on what is known about PHM mechanism.

=== Substrate specificity ===
Biosynthetic pathways for catecholamines and trace amines in the human brain
In humans, catecholamines and phenethylaminergic trace amines are derived from the amino acid L-phenylalanine.

Dopamine β-hydroxylase catalyzes the hydroxylation of not only dopamine but also other phenylethylamine derivatives when available. The minimum requirement seems to be the phenylethylamine skeleton: a benzene ring with a two-carbon side chain that terminates in an amino group.

== Assays for DBH activity in human serum and cerebrospinal fluid ==
DBH activity in human serum could be estimated by a spectrophotometric method or with the aid of ultra-high-performance liquid chromatography with photo diode array detector (UHPLC-PDA). A sensitive assay for the detection of DBH activity in cerebrospinal fluid using high-performance liquid chromatography with electrochemical detector (HPLC-ECD) was also described earlier.

=== Expression quantitative trait loci (eQTLs) at DBH loci ===
Genetic variants such as single-nucleotide polymorphisms (SNPs) at DBH loci were found to be associated with DBH activity and are well known expression quantitative trait loci. Allele variants at two regulatory SNPs namely rs1611115 and rs1989787 were shown to affect transcription of this gene. Mutations identified in dopamine β-hydroxylase deficiency and non-synonymous SNPs such as rs6271 in this gene were found to cause defective secretion of the protein from the endoplasmic reticulum.

== Clinical significance ==
DBH primarily contributes to catecholamine and trace amine biosynthesis. It also participates in the metabolism of xenobiotics related to these substances; for example, the human DBH enzyme catalyzes the beta-hydroxylation of amphetamine and para-hydroxyamphetamine, producing norephedrine and para-hydroxynorephedrine respectively.

DBH has been implicated as correlating factor in conditions associated with decision making and addictive drugs, e.g., alcoholism and smoking, attention deficit hyperactivity disorder, schizophrenia, and Alzheimer's disease. Inadequate DBH is called dopamine β-hydroxylase deficiency.

== Structure ==
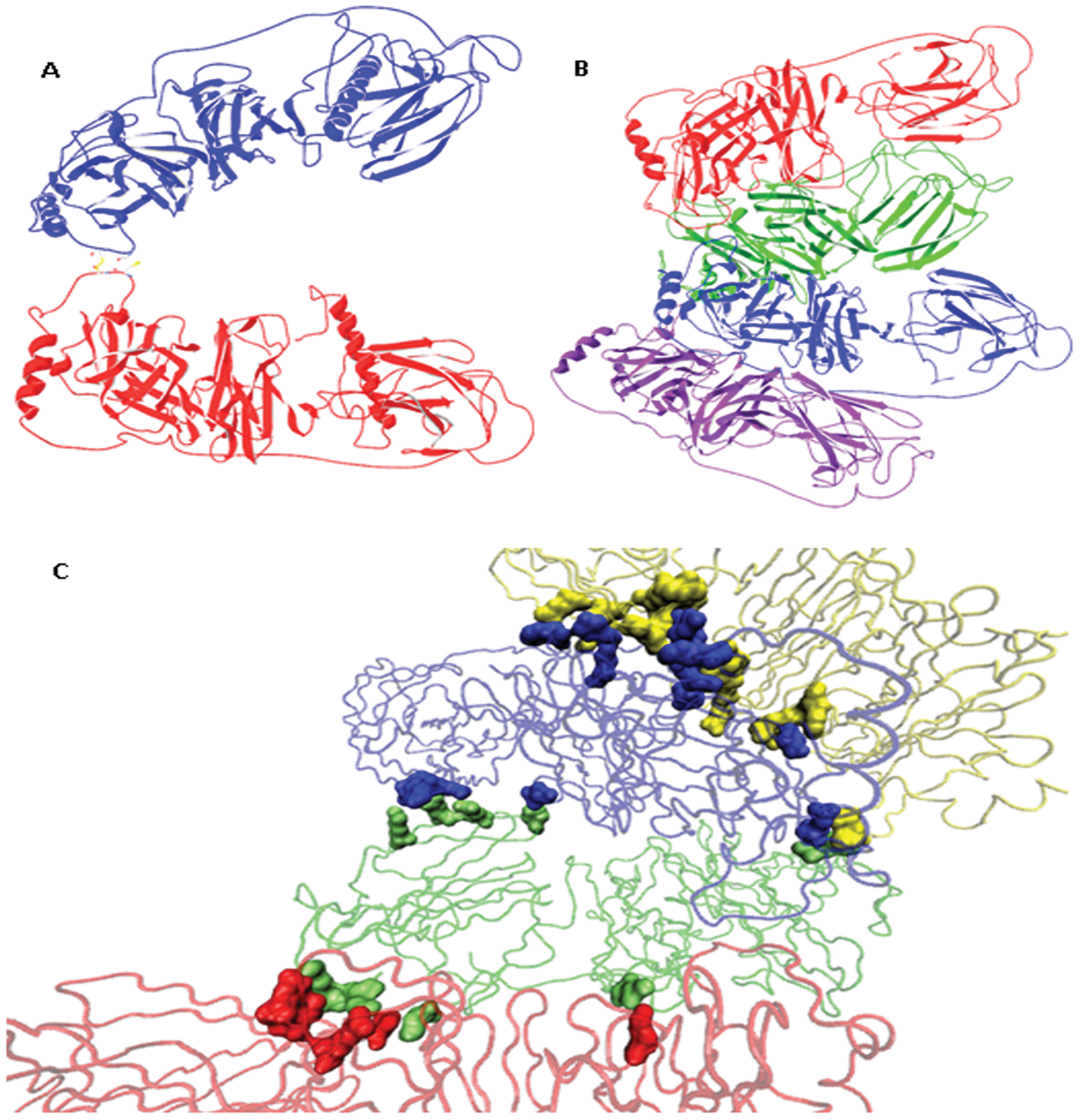
Experimental DBH structural model based upon in silico prediction and physiochemical validation

It was difficult to obtain a stable crystal of dopamine β-hydroxylase. Hence an homology model based on the primary sequence and comparison to PHM is available.

However, a crystal structure was also put forward in 2016.

== Regulation and inhibition ==
This protein may use the morpheein model of allosteric regulation.

=== Inhibitors ===
Types of dopamine β-hydroxylase inhibition
	HYD (Note: hydralazine)	HP (Note: 2-hydrazinopyridine)	QCA (Note: 2-quinoline-carboxylic acid)	IQCA (Note: l-isoquinolinecarboxylic acid)	BI (Note: 2,2'-biimidazole)	IAA (Note: imidazole-4-acetic acid)
Competitive	Ascorbate	Ascorbate	Ascorbate	Ascorbate	Ascorbate	Ascorbate
Uncompetitive			Tyramine	Tyramine		
Mixed	Tyramine	Tyramine			Tyramine	Tyramine
Ascorbate is cofactor; tyramine is substitute for dopamine, DBH's namesake substrate

DBH is inhibited by disulfiram, tropolone, and, most selectively, by nepicastat. It is also inhibited by etamicastat and zamicastat.

DBH is reversibly inhibited by l-2H-Phthalazine hydrazone (hydralazine; HYD), 2-1H-pyridinone hydrazone (2-hydrazinopyridine; HP), 2-quinoline-carboxylic acid (QCA), l-isoquinolinecarboxylic acid (IQCA), 2,2'-bi-lH-imidazole (2,2'-biimidazole; BI), and IH-imidazole-4-acetic acid (imidazole-4-acetic acid; IAA). HYD, QCA, and IAA are allosteric competitive.

== Nomenclature ==
The systematic name of this enzyme class is 3,4-dihydroxyphenethylamine, ascorbate:oxygen oxidoreductase (β-hydroxylating).

Other names in common use include:

- dopamine β-monooxygenase
- dopamine β-hydroxylase
- membrane-associated dopamine β-monooxygenase (MDBH)
- soluble dopamine β-monooxygenase (SDBH)
- dopamine-B-hydroxylase
- 3,4-dihydroxyphenethylamine β-oxidase
- 4-(2-aminoethyl) pyrocatechol β-oxidase
- dopa β-hydroxylase
- dopamine β-oxidase
- dopamine hydroxylase
- phenylamine β-hydroxylase
- (3,4-dihydroxyphenethylamine) β-mono-oxygenase
