= Postural orthostatic tachycardia syndrome =

Abnormally high heart rate after a postural change

- Other names: Postural tachycardia syndrome (PoTS)
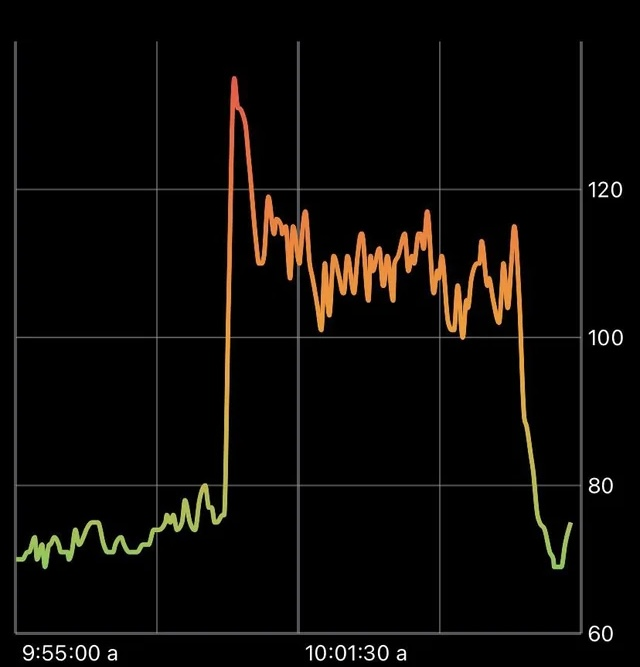
- Tachycardia after a postural change in a patient with POTS
- Specialty: Cardiology, neurology
- Symptoms: More often with standing: lightheadedness, fainting, trouble thinking, tachycardia, weakness, palpitations, heat intolerance, acrocyanosis
- Usual onset: Most common (modal) age of onset is 14 years
- Types: Neuropathic, hyperadrenergic, hypovolemic
- Causes: Viral infection, trauma, pregnancy, autoimmunity
- Risk factors: Family history, female sex, Ehlers–Danlos syndrome, mast cell activation syndrome, autoimmune conditions, certain medications
- Diagnostic method: Active stand test (heart rate and blood pressure measurement), tilt table test
- Differential diagnosis: Dehydration, heart problems, adrenal insufficiency, epilepsy, Parkinson's disease, anemia
- Treatment: Increasing dietary salt and water, compression garments, exercise, medications
- Medication: Beta blockers, ivabradine, midodrine, fludrocortisone, pyridostigmine
- Prognosis: c. 90% improve with treatment, 25% of patients unable to work
- Frequency: ~ 1,000,000 ~ 3,000,000 (US)

Postural orthostatic tachycardia syndrome (POTS) is a condition characterized by an abnormal increase in heart rate upon sitting up or standing. POTS in adults is characterized by a heart rate increase of 30 beats per minute within ten minutes of standing up, accompanied by other symptoms. This increased heart rate should occur in the absence of a significant drop in blood pressure. POTS is a disorder of the autonomic nervous system that can lead to a variety of symptoms. Upon standing, individuals can experience lightheadedness, blurred vision, heart palpitations, weakness, and tremor (shaking). In addition, individuals can experience fatigue, headaches, brain fog, exercise intolerance, nausea, difficulty concentrating, chest pain, and shortness of breath.

POTS is thought to be caused by problems in the autonomic nervous system, which controls heart rate and blood flow. These problems may include blood pooling in the legs, reducing blood return to the heart, or the heart beating faster to make up for low blood pressure. It can develop after a viral infection, surgery, trauma, autoimmune disease, or pregnancy. For instance, it can emerge after contracting COVID-19, as part of long COVID, or possibly in rare cases after COVID-19 vaccination, though causative evidence is limited and further study is needed. POTS is more common among people who got infected with SARS-CoV-2 than among those who got vaccinated against COVID-19. Risk factors include a family history of the condition.

More than 50% of patients whose condition was triggered by a viral infection get better within five years. About 80% of patients have symptomatic improvement with treatment, while 25% are so disabled they are unable to work. A retrospective study on patients with adolescent-onset has shown that five years after diagnosis, 19% of patients had full resolution of symptoms.

An estimated 1–3 million people in the United States have POTS. The average age for POTS onset is 20, and it occurs about five times more frequently in females than in males.

== Signs and symptoms ==
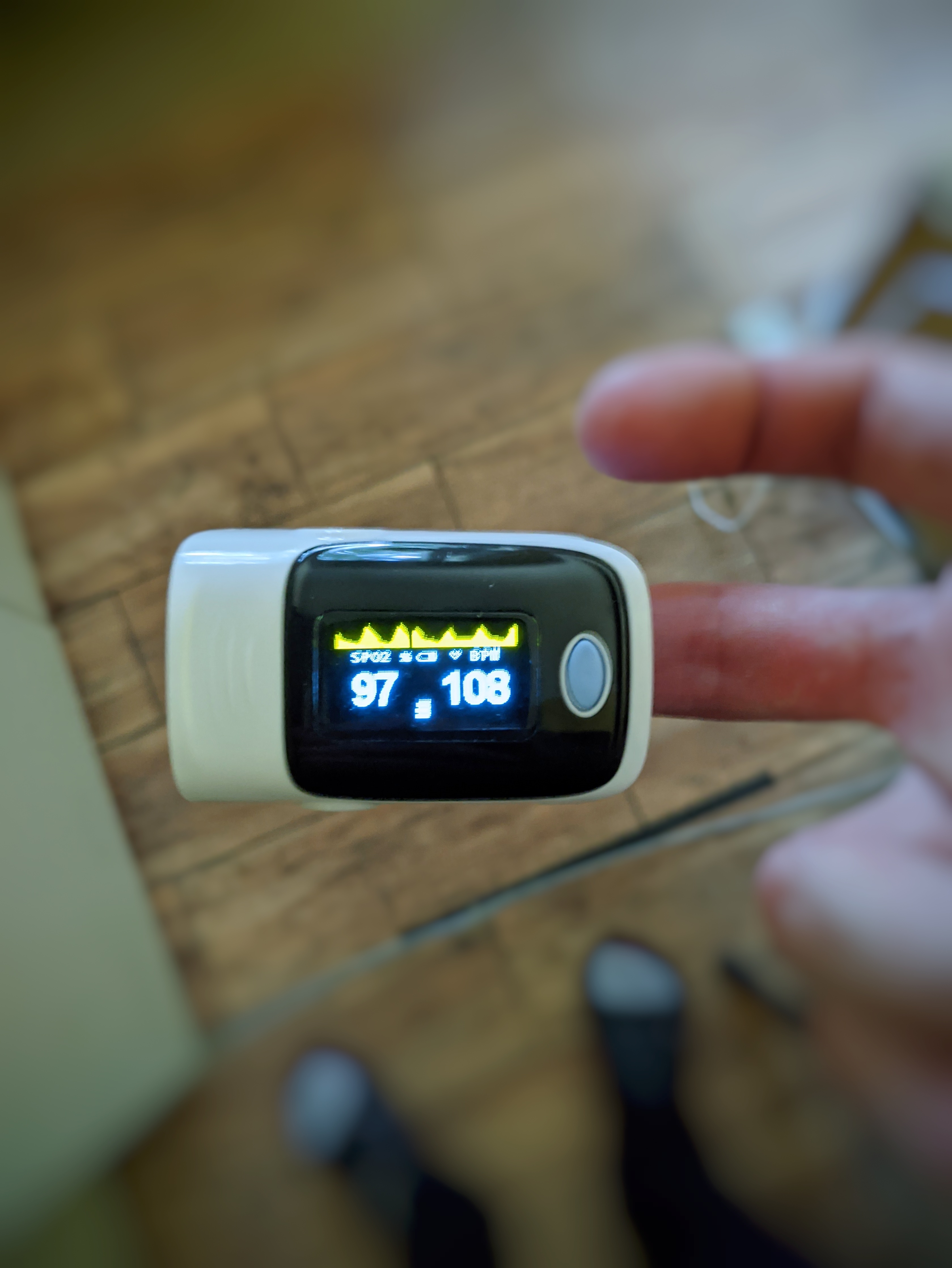
Person standing and measuring heart rate with a pulse oximeter which shows tachycardia of 108 bpm

Individuals with POTS can have a large array of symptoms, which may differ significantly between people. Individuals living with POTS experience a diminished quality of life compared to healthy individuals, due to disruptions in various domains such as standing, playing sports, symptom anxiety, and impacts on school, work, or spiritual (religious) domains—these disruptions affect their daily life and overall well-being.

In adults, the primary manifestation is an increase in heart rate of more than 30 beats per minute within ten minutes of standing up. The resulting heart rate is typically more than 120 beats per minute. For people between the ages of 12 and 19, the minimum increase for a POTS diagnosis is 40 beats per minute.

POTS is often accompanied by common features of orthostatic intolerance—in which symptoms that develop while upright are relieved by reclining. These orthostatic symptoms include palpitations, lightheadedness, chest discomfort, shortness of breath, nausea, weakness or "heaviness" in the lower legs, blurred vision, and cognitive difficulties. Symptoms may be exacerbated with prolonged sitting, prolonged standing, alcohol, heat, exercise, or eating a large meal.

Up to one-third of POTS patients experience fainting for many reasons, including but not limited to standing, physical exertion, or heat exposure. POTS patients may also experience orthostatic headaches. Some POTS patients may develop blood pooling in the extremities, characterized by a reddish-purple color of the legs or hands upon standing. 48% of people with POTS report chronic fatigue and 32% report sleep disturbances.

POTS and dysautonomia sometimes present with narrowed pulse pressures. In such cases, patients experience a drop in pulse pressure to 0 mm Hg upon standing, rendering them practically pulseless while upright. This condition leads to significant morbidity, as many affected individuals struggle to stand at all.

Additional signs and symptoms are varied, and may include excessive sweating, lack of sweating, heat intolerance, digestive issues such as nausea, indigestion, bloating, constipation or diarrhea, post-exertional malaise, coat-hanger pain, brain fog, and syncope or presyncope.

Whereas POTS is primarily characterized by its impact on the autonomic and cardiovascular systems, it can lead to substantial functional impairment. This impairment, often manifesting as symptoms such as fatigue, cognitive dysfunction, and sleep disturbances, can significantly diminish the patient's quality of life.

=== Brain fog ===
One of the most disabling and prevalent symptoms in POTS is "brain fog", a term used by patients to describe the cognitive difficulties they experience. In one survey of 138 POTS patients, brain fog was defined as "forgetful" (91%), "difficulty thinking" (89%), and "difficulty focusing" (88%). Other common descriptions were "difficulty processing what others say" (80%), "confusion" (71%), "getting lost" (64%), and "thoughts moving too quickly" (40%). The same survey described the most common triggers of brain fog to be fatigue (91%), lack of sleep (90%), prolonged standing (87%), and dehydration (86%).

Neuropsychological testing has shown that a POTS patient has reduced attention (Ruff 2&7 speed and WAIS-III digits forward), short-term memory (WAIS-III digits back), cognitive processing speed (symbol digits modalities test), and executive function (Stroop word color and trails B).

A potential cause for brain fog is a decrease in cerebral blood flow (CBF), especially in the upright position.

There may be a loss of neurovascular coupling and reduced functional hyperemia in response to cognitive challenge under orthostatic stress, perhaps related to a loss of autoregulatory buffering of beat-by-beat fluctuations in arterial blood flow.

=== Comorbidities ===
Conditions that are commonly reported with POTS include:

- Migraine (40%)
- Irritable bowel syndrome (30%)
- Ehlers–Danlos syndrome (18–25%)
- Asthma (20%)
- Fibromyalgia (20%)
- Reynaud's syndrome (16%)
- Iron deficiency anemia (16%)
- Autoimmune disease (16%)
- Gastroparesis (14%)
- Vasovagal syncope (13–25%)
- Inappropriate sinus tachycardia (11%)
- Mast cell activation disorder (9%)

There are some overlaps between POTS and myalgic encephalomyelitis/chronic fatigue syndrome (ME/CFS), with evidence of POTS in 10–20% of ME/CFS cases. Fatigue and reduced exercise tolerance are prominent symptoms of both conditions, and dysautonomia may underlie both conditions.

== Causes ==
In up to 50% of cases, symptom onset followed a viral illness. It may also be linked to physical trauma, concussion, pregnancy, surgery, menarche, or psychosocial stress. These events could act as a trigger for an autoimmune response that result in POTS. It has been shown to emerge in previously healthy patients after COVID-19, or after COVID-19 vaccination.

A 2023 review found that the chances of being diagnosed with POTS within 90 days after mRNA vaccination were 1.33 times higher compared to 90 days before vaccination. Still, the results are inconclusive due to a small sample size; only 12 cases of newly diagnosed POTS after mRNA vaccination were reported, all these 12 patients having autoimmune antibodies. However, the risk of POTS-related diagnoses was 5.35 times higher after getting infected with SARS-CoV-2 compared to after mRNA vaccination. Possible mechanisms for COVID-induced POTS are hypovolemia, autoimmunity/inflammation from antibody production against autonomic nerve fibers, and direct toxic effects of COVID-19, or secondary sympathetic nervous system stimulation.

POTS is more common in females than males with up to 94% of patients being female. POTS also has been linked to patients with a history of autoimmune diseases, long COVID, irritable bowel syndrome, anemia, hyperthyroidism, fibromyalgia, diabetes, amyloidosis, sarcoidosis, systemic lupus erythematosus, and cancer. Genetics likely plays a role, with one study finding that one in eight POTS patients reported a history of orthostatic intolerance in their family.

Physical deconditioning may be a factor involved in POTS. It has been proposed that there are parallels between POTS and physical deconditioning or people who have undergone prolonged periods of bed rest. Both POTS and deconditioning are marked by cardiac atrophy, reduced blood volume, and other physical changes. There are however distinct differences between classic cardiovascular deconditioning and POTS in most cases.

== Mechanisms ==
The three main subtypes of POTS can overlap.

The pathophysiology of POTS is not attributable to a single cause or unified hypothesis—it is the result of multiple interacting mechanisms, each contributing to the overall clinical presentation; the mechanisms may include autonomic dysfunction, hypovolemia, deconditioning, hyperadrenergic states, etc. These mechanisms are poorly understood, and can overlap, with many patients showing features of multiple POTS types.

=== Hypovolemic POTS ===
Many people with POTS exhibit low blood volume (hypovolemia), which can decrease the rate of blood flow to the heart. To compensate for low blood volume, the heart increases its cardiac output by beating faster (reflex tachycardia), leading to the symptoms of presyncope.

=== Hyperadrenergic POTS ===
In the 30–60% of cases classified as hyperadrenergic POTS, norepinephrine levels are elevated on standing, often due to hypovolemia or partial autonomic neuropathy. A smaller minority of people with POTS have (typically very high) standing norepinephrine levels that are elevated even in the absence of hypovolemia and autonomic neuropathy; this is classified as central hyperadrenergic POTS. The high norepinephrine levels contribute to symptoms of tachycardia.

=== Neuropathic POTS ===
Another subtype, neuropathic POTS, is associated with denervation of sympathetic nerves in the lower limbs. In this subtype, impaired constriction of the blood vessels causes blood to pool in the veins of the lower limbs. Heart rate increases to compensate for this blood pooling.

A subset of POTS patients have markedly reduced myocardial MIBG reuptake via MIBG myocardial scintigraphy, interpreted to be a potential manifestation of autonomic cardiac neuropathy, although reduced expression of the norepinephrine transporter may also result in impaired MIBG reuptake and has been implicated in POTS.

=== Autoimmunity ===
There is an increasing number of studies indicating that POTS is an autoimmune disease. A high number of patients have elevated levels of autoantibodies against the α_{1}-adrenergic receptor and against the muscarinic acetylcholine M_{4} receptor.

Elevations of autoantibodies targeting the α_{1}-adrenergic receptor have been associated with symptom severity in patients with POTS.

More recently, autoantibodies against other targets have been identified in small cohorts of POTS patients. Signs of innate immune system activation with elaboration of pro-inflammatory cytokines has also been reported in a cohort of POTS patients. Studies suggest the involvement of adrenergic, cholinergic, and angiotensin II type I autoantibodies in the pathogenesis of orthostatic intolerance. These autoantibodies are thought to interfere with the normal functioning of the autonomic nervous system, leading to the symptoms observed in POTS. There is thus a growing interest in the use of immunomodulation therapy, which aims to regulate or normalize the immune response to reduce the production of harmful autoantibodies, as a potential treatment strategy for POTS.

=== Secondary POTS ===
If POTS is caused by another condition, it may be classified as secondary POTS. Common causes of secondary POTS are chronic diabetes mellitus, autoimmune disorders like multiple sclerosis, lupus, and Sjögren's disease, connective tissue disorders like Ehlers–Danlos syndrome (EDS) and Marfan syndrome and post-viral syndromes caused by diseases like Epstein–Barr or COVID-19.

A trifecta of POTS, EDS, and mast cell activation syndrome (MCAS) is becoming more common, with a genetic marker common among all three conditions. With MCAS, it is not yet clear whether MCAS is a secondary cause of POTS or simply comorbid; however, treating MCAS for these patients can significantly improve POTS symptoms.

POTS can sometimes be a paraneoplastic syndrome associated with cancer.

There have also been reports of patients experiencing co-occurring POTS, May–Thurner syndrome, and EDS.

== Diagnosis ==
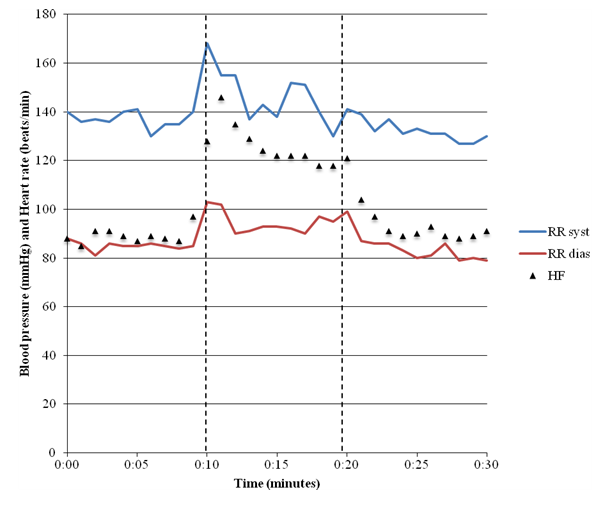
Results of a tilt table test positive for POTS

Diagnosis of POTS can usually take place in primary care (e.g. family doctors or GPs), but may require specialists in more complicated cases. Patients must show a heart rate increase of at least 30 beats per minute (or over 120 bpm) within 10 minutes of standing, and diagnosis requires symptoms without a major drop in blood pressure. Doctors must also rule out other conditions, such as dehydration or heart disease.

POTS is most commonly diagnosed by a cardiologist (41%), cardiac electrophysiologist (15%), or neurologist (19%). The average number of physicians seen before receiving diagnosis is seven, and the average delay before diagnosis is 4.7 years.

=== Diagnostic criteria ===
A POTS diagnosis requires the following characteristics:

- For patients age 20 or older, a sustained increase in heart rate ≥30 bpm within ten minutes of upright posture (tilt table test or standing) from a supine position.
  - For patients age 12–19, the heart rate increase must be >40 bpm.
- Associated with frequent symptoms of lightheadedness, palpitations, tremulousness, generalized weakness, blurred vision, or fatigue that are worse with upright posture and that improve with recumbence.
- An absence of orthostatic hypotension (i.e., no sustained systolic blood pressure drop of 20 mmHg or more).
- Chronic symptoms that have lasted for longer than three months.
- Other disorders, medications, or functional states that are known to predispose to orthostatic tachycardia such as a spinal fluid leak (called spontaneous intracranial hypotension), dehydration, orthostatic hypotension, heart problems, adrenal insufficiency, epilepsy, and Parkinson's disease must not be present.

=== Diagnostic tests ===
POTS can be measured with an active stand test or a head-up tilt test. Often, the active stand test is sufficient. First, individuals are asked to lie down for a period of 5 to 10 minutes. Upon standing, heart rate and blood pressure are measured every minute for ten minutes. Symptoms (e.g. dizziness) are recorded too. For the test, medication that can change heart rates are stopped before as appropriate. Compared to a tilt table test, there is typically a smaller increase in heart rate, and sometimes a repeat is necessary if POTS is highly suspected but the initial test did not clearly show POTS was present.

If a active standing test is not suitable (for instance, if there is a risk of falling), POTS can be measured with a tilt table test, in which the patient lies flat on a special table while their heart rate and blood pressure are monitored. The table is then slowly tilted upward to a standing position. This tilting allows doctors to see how the body reacts to standing without the patient actually moving. If a patient's heart rate increases by 30 beats per minute or more within 10 minutes of being tilted upward, and blood pressure does not drop significantly, this supports a diagnosis of POTS.

Alternative tests to the tilt table test are also used, such as the and the adapted Autonomic Profile (aAP) which require less equipment to complete. Nonpostural testing, such as the Valsalva maneuver, which may minimize the triggering of POTS symptoms, can be used prior to or in conjunction with the aforementioned techniques as a potential indicator of orthostatic intolerance, including POTS.

=== Orthostatic intolerance ===
An increase in heart rate upon moving to an upright posture is known as orthostatic (upright) tachycardia (fast heart rate). It occurs without any coinciding drop in blood pressure, as that would indicate orthostatic hypotension. (Low blood pressure when transitioning from sitting to standing). Certain medications to treat POTS may cause orthostatic hypotension. The tachycardia is accompanied by other features of orthostatic intolerance—symptoms that develop in an upright position and are relieved by reclining. These orthostatic symptoms include palpitations, light-headedness, chest discomfort, shortness of breath, nausea, weakness or "heaviness" in the lower legs, blurred vision, and cognitive difficulties.

=== Differential diagnoses ===
A variety of autonomic tests are employed to exclude autonomic disorders that could underlie symptoms, while endocrine testing is used to exclude hyperthyroidism and rarer endocrine conditions. Electrocardiography is normally performed on all patients to exclude other possible causes of tachycardia. In cases where a particular associated condition or complicating factor are suspected, other non-autonomic tests may be used: echocardiography to exclude mitral valve prolapse, and thermal threshold tests for small-fiber neuropathy.

Testing the cardiovascular response to prolonged head-up tilting, exercise, eating, and heat stress may help determine the best strategy for managing symptoms. POTS has also been divided into several types (see § Causes), which may benefit from distinct treatments. People with neuropathic POTS show a loss of sweating in the feet during sweat tests, as well as impaired norepinephrine release in the leg, but not arm. This is believed to reflect peripheral sympathetic denervation in the lower limbs. People with hyperadrenergic POTS show a marked increase of blood pressure and norepinephrine levels when standing, and are more likely to have from prominent palpitations, anxiety, and tachycardia.

People with POTS can be misdiagnosed with inappropriate sinus tachycardia (IST) as they present similarly. One distinguishing feature is that those with POTS rarely exhibit >100 bpm while in a supine position, while patients with IST often have a resting heart rate >100 bpm. Additionally, patients with POTS display a more pronounced change in heart rate in response to postural change.

== Treatment ==
Despite numerous therapeutic interventions proposed for the management of POTS, none have received approval from the U.S. Food and Drug Administration (FDA) specifically for this indication, and no effective treatment strategies have been identified that would have been confirmed by large clinical trials.

POTS treatment involves using multiple methods in combination to counteract cardiovascular dysfunction, address symptoms, and simultaneously address any associated disorders. For most patients, water intake should be increased, especially after waking, to expand blood volume (reducing hypovolemia). Eight to ten cups of water daily are recommended. Increasing salt intake, by adding salt to food, taking salt tablets, or drinking sports drinks and other electrolyte solutions, is an effective way to raise blood pressure by helping the body retain water. Combining these techniques with gradual physical training enhances their effect. In some cases, when increasing oral fluids and salt intake is not enough, intravenous saline or the drug desmopressin is used to help increase fluid retention.

Large meals worsen symptoms for some people. These people may benefit from eating small meals frequently throughout the day instead. Alcohol and food high in carbohydrates can also exacerbate symptoms of orthostatic hypotension. Excessive consumption of caffeine beverages should be avoided, because they can promote urine production (leading to fluid loss) and consequently hypovolemia. Exposure to extreme heat may also aggravate symptoms.

Prolonged physical inactivity can worsen the symptoms of POTS. POTS may be caused or exacerbated by deconditioning. Techniques that increase a person's capacity for exercise, such as endurance training or graded exercise therapy, can relieve symptoms for some patients. Exercise programs may be very effective and can lead to symptom improvement in some people with POTS, but should not be used for patients who also have ME/CFS. Aerobic exercise performed for 20 minutes a day, three times a week, is sometimes recommended for patients who can tolerate it. Exercise may have the immediate effect of worsening tachycardia, especially after a meal or on a hot day. In these cases, it may be easier to exercise in a semi-reclined position, such as riding a recumbent bicycle, rowing, or swimming. Although exercise may be difficult initially, it may become progressively easier as physical conditioning improves.

When changing to an upright posture, finishing a meal, or concluding exercise, a sustained hand grip can briefly raise the blood pressure, possibly reducing symptoms. Compression garments can also be of benefit by constricting the blood vessels with external body pressure.

=== Medication ===
If non-pharmacological methods are ineffective, medication may be necessary. Medications used may include beta blockers, pyridostigmine, midodrine, or fludrocortisone, among others. Clonidine is useful in the hyperadrenergic-hyperarousal subtype, but may result in dangerous hypotension in other subtypes. As of 2013, no medication has been approved by the U.S. Food and Drug Administration to treat POTS, but a variety are used off-label. Their efficacy has not yet been examined in long-term randomized controlled trials.

Fludrocortisone, a mineralocorticoid, may be used to enhance sodium retention and blood volume, which may be beneficial both by augmenting sympathetically mediated vasoconstriction and because a large subset of POTS patients appear to have low absolute blood volume. However, fludrocortisone may cause hypokalemia (low potassium levels).

While people with POTS typically have normal or even elevated arterial blood pressure, the neuropathic form of POTS is presumed to be a selective sympathetic venous denervation. In these patients the selective α_{1}-adrenergic receptor agonist midodrine may increase venous return, enhance stroke volume, and improve symptoms. Midodrine should only be taken during the daylight hours as it may promote supine hypertension.

Sinus node blocker ivabradine can successfully restrain heart rate in POTS without affecting blood pressure, as demonstrated in approximately 60% of people with POTS treated in an open-label trial of ivabradine experienced symptom improvement.

Pyridostigmine, an acetylcholinesterase inhibitor and parasympathomimetic, has been reported to restrain heart rate and improve chronic symptoms in approximately half of POTS patients reviewed. However, it may cause GI side effects that limit its use in around 20% of its patient population.

The selective α_{1}-adrenergic receptor agonist phenylephrine has been used successfully to enhance venous return and stroke volume in some people with POTS. However, this medication may be hampered by poor oral bioavailability. Indirectly acting sympathomimetics, like the norepinephrine releasing agents ephedrine and pseudoephedrine and the norepinephrine–dopamine reuptake inhibitors methylphenidate and bupropion, have also been used in the treatment of POTS. The norepinephrine prodrug droxidopa has been used as well.

Pharmacologic treatments for postural tachycardia syndrome
| POTS subtypes | Therapeutic action | Goal | Drug(s) |
|---|---|---|---|
| Neuropathic POTS | α_{1}-Adrenergic receptor agonist | Constrict the peripheral blood vessels, aiding venous return. | Midodrine |
| Neuropathic POTS | Splanchnic–mesenteric vasoconstriction | Splanchnic vasoconstriction | Octreotide |
| Hypovolemic POTS | Synthetic mineralocorticoid | Forces the body to retain salt. Increase blood volume | Fludrocortisone (Florinef) |
| Hypovolemic POTS | Vasopressin receptor agonist | Helps retain water, increases blood volume | Desmopressin (DDAVP) |
| Hyperadrenergic POTS | Beta-blockers (non-selective) | Decrease sympathetic tone and heart rate. | Propranolol (Inderal) |
| Hyperadrenergic POTS | Beta-blockers (selective) | Decrease sympathetic tone and heart rate. | Metoprolol (Toprol), Bisoprolol |
| Hyperadrenergic POTS | Selective sinus node blockade | Directly reducing tachycardia. | Ivabradine |
| Hyperadrenergic POTS | α_{2}-Adrenergic receptor agonist | Decreases blood pressure and sympathetic nerve traffic. | Clonidine, Methyldopa |
| Hyperadrenergic POTS | Anticholinesterase inhibitors | Splanchnic vasoconstriction. Increase blood pressure. | Pyridostigmine |
| Other (refractory POTS) | Psychostimulant | Improve cognitive symptoms (brain fog) | Modafinil |
| Other (refractory POTS) | Central nervous system stimulant | Tighten blood vessels. Increases alertness and improves brain fog. | Methylphenidate (Ritalin, Concerta) |
| Other (refractory POTS) | Direct and indirect α_{1}-adrenoreceptor agonist. | Increased blood flow | Ephedrine and Pseudoephedrine |
| Other (refractory POTS) | Norepinephrine precursor | Improve blood vessel contraction | Droxidopa (Northera) |
| Other (refractory POTS) | α_{2}-Adrenergic receptor antagonist | Increase blood pressure | Yohimbine |

== Prognosis ==
POTS has a favorable prognosis when managed appropriately. Symptoms improve within five years of diagnosis for many patients, and 60% return to their original level of functioning. Post-viral forms of POTS, including those associated with COVID-19, may follow a faster course of improvement. One case series found that 94% of patients with long COVID-associated POTS showed symptomatic improvement within 159 days of their initial clinic visit; a systematic review found that 86% of patients with post-COVID POTS showed symptomatic improvement over time, but many remained symptomatic for several months. Approximately 90% of people with POTS respond to a combination of pharmacological and physical treatments. Those who develop POTS in their early to mid teens will likely respond well to a combination of physical methods as well as pharmacotherapy. Outcomes are more guarded for adults newly diagnosed with POTS. Some people do not recover, and a few even worsen with time. The hyperadrenergic type of POTS typically requires continuous therapy. If POTS is caused by another condition, outcomes depend on the prognosis of the underlying disorder.

== Epidemiology ==
The prevalence of POTS is unknown. Before the COVID-19 pandemic, data from the US showed a prevalence rate between 0.1% and 1%. A separate study showed that prevalence before a COVID-19 infection was 1.73%, rising to 3.42% after an infection. POTS is more common in women than men, with a female-to-male ratio of 4:1 to 9:1. POTS is most prevalent at ages 15 to 50. The most common age of onset, based on a survey of individual with self-reported POTS diagnosis, is 14.

== History ==
In 1871, physician Jacob Mendes Da Costa described a condition that resembled the modern concept of POTS. He named it irritable heart syndrome. Cardiologist Thomas Lewis expanded on the description, coining the term soldier's heart because it was often found among military personnel. The condition came to be known as Da Costa's syndrome, which is now recognized as several distinct disorders, including POTS.

Postural tachycardia syndrome was coined in 1982 in a description of a patient who had postural tachycardia, but not orthostatic hypotension. Ronald Schondorf and Phillip A. Low of the Mayo Clinic first used the name postural orthostatic tachycardia syndrome, POTS, in 1993.

== Notable cases ==
British politician Nicola Blackwood revealed in March 2015 that she had been diagnosed with Ehlers–Danlos syndrome in 2013 and that she had later been diagnosed with POTS. She was appointed Parliamentary Under-Secretary of State for Life Science by Prime Minister Theresa May in 2019 and given a life peerage that enabled her to take a seat in Parliament. As a junior minister, it is her responsibility to answer questions in parliament on the subjects of Health and departmental business. When answering these questions, it is customary for ministers to sit when listening to the question and then to rise to give an answer from the despatch box, thus standing up and sitting down numerous times in quick succession throughout a series of questions. On 17 June 2019, she fainted during one of these questioning sessions after standing up from a sitting position four times in the space of twelve minutes, and it was suggested that her POTS was a factor in her fainting. Asked about the incident, she stated: "I was frustrated and embarrassed my body gave up on me at work ... But I am grateful it gives me a chance to shine a light on a condition many others are also living with."

In 2024, Taiwanese tennis player Latisha Chan revealed that she was diagnosed with POTS back in 2014 and has been receiving treatments before Summer Olympics as well. Her condition was considered career-threatening, but has had her career extended by over a decade due to external counterpulsation.

In her 2024 memoir Just Add Water, Olympic gold medalist swimmer Katie Ledecky shared that she has a mild form of POTS.

Latvian basketball player Kristaps Porziņģis was sidelined for much of the 2024–25 NBA season with POTS.

== See also ==
- List of investigational orthostatic intolerance drugs
