= Dysautonomia =

Any disease or malfunction of the autonomic nervous system

- Other names: Autonomic failure, Autonomic dysfunction
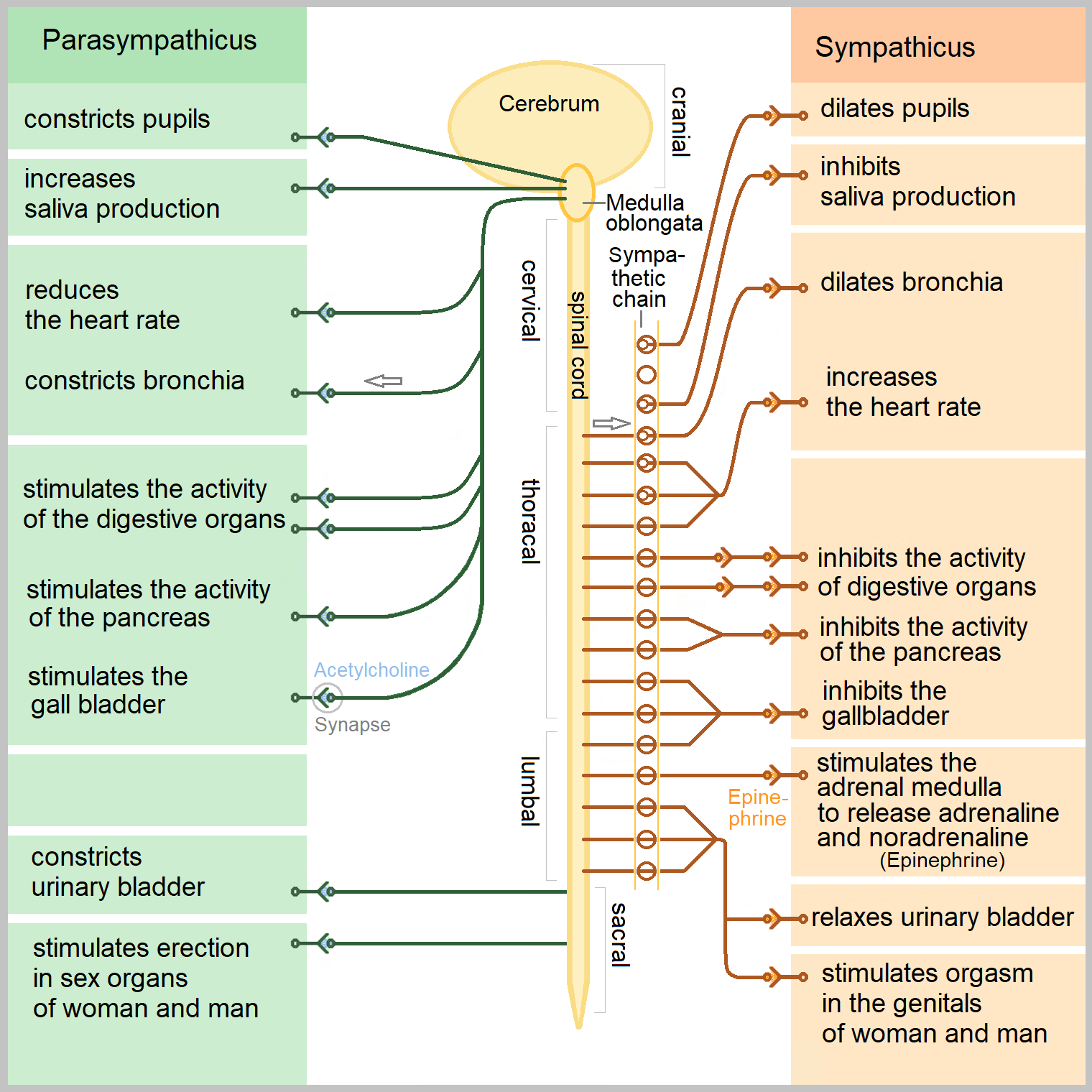
- The autonomic nervous system
- Specialty: Neurology
- Symptoms: Anhidrosis or hyperhidrosis, blurred vision, tunnel vision, orthostatic hypotension, constipation, diarrhea, dysphagia, bowel incontinence, urinary retention or urinary incontinence, dizziness, brain fog, exercise intolerance, tachycardia, vertigo, weakness and pruritus.
- Causes: Inadequacy of sympathetic, or parasympathetic, components of autonomic nervous system
- Risk factors: Alcoholism and diabetes
- Diagnostic method: Ambulatory blood pressure, as well as EKG monitoring
- Treatment: Symptomatic and supportive

Dysautonomia, autonomic failure, or autonomic dysfunction is a condition in which the autonomic nervous system (ANS) does not work properly. This condition may affect the functioning of the heart, bladder, intestines, sweat glands, pupils, and blood vessels. Dysautonomia has many causes, not all of which may be classified as neuropathic. A number of conditions can feature dysautonomia, such as Parkinson's disease, Long COVID, multiple system atrophy, dementia with Lewy bodies, Ehlers–Danlos syndromes, autoimmune autonomic ganglionopathy and autonomic neuropathy, HIV/AIDS, mitochondrial cytopathy, pure autonomic failure, autism, and postural orthostatic tachycardia syndrome.

Diagnosis is made by functional testing of the ANS, focusing on the affected organ system. Investigations may be performed to identify underlying disease processes that led to the development of symptoms or autonomic neuropathy. Symptomatic treatment is available for many symptoms associated with dysautonomia, and some disease processes can be directly treated. Depending on the severity of the dysfunction, dysautonomia can range from being nearly symptomless and transient to disabling and/or life-threatening.

== Signs and symptoms ==
Dysautonomia, a complex set of conditions characterized by autonomic nervous system (ANS) dysfunction, manifests clinically with a diverse array of symptoms of which postural orthostatic tachycardia syndrome (POTS) stands out as the most common.

The symptoms of dysautonomia, which are numerous and vary widely by person, are due to inefficient or unbalanced efferent signals sent via both systems. Symptoms in people with dysautonomia include:

- Anhydrosis or hyperhidrosis
- Blurry or double vision
- Bowel incontinence
- Brain fog
- Constipation
- Dizziness
- Difficulty swallowing
- Exercise intolerance
- Low blood pressure
- Orthostatic hypotension
- Sleep apnea
- Syncope
- Tachycardia
- Tunnel vision
- Urinary incontinence or urinary retention

== Causes ==
Vincristine

Dysautonomia may be due to inherited or degenerative neurologic diseases (primary dysautonomia) or injury of the autonomic nervous system from an acquired disorder (secondary dysautonomia). Its most common causes include:

- Alcoholism
- Amyloidosis
- Autoimmune disease, such as Sjögren's disease or systemic lupus erythematosus (lupus), and autoimmune autonomic ganglionopathy
- Craniocervical instability
- Diabetes
- Eaton–Lambert syndrome
- Ehlers–Danlos syndrome
- Guillain–Barré syndrome
- HIV/AIDS
- Long COVID
- Multiple sclerosis, meningitis-retention syndrome
- Paraneoplastic syndrome
- Spinal cord injury or traumatic brain injury
- Synucleinopathy, a group of neurodegenerative diseases including pure autonomic failure, Parkinson's disease, dementia with Lewy bodies and multiple system atrophy
- Surgery or injury involving the nerves
- Toxicity (vincristine)

In the sympathetic nervous system (SNS), predominant dysautonomia is common along with fibromyalgia, chronic fatigue syndrome, irritable bowel syndrome, and interstitial cystitis, raising the possibility that such dysautonomia could be their common clustering underlying pathogenesis.

In addition to sometimes being a symptom of dysautonomia, anxiety can sometimes physically manifest symptoms resembling autonomic dysfunction. A thorough investigation ruling out physiological causes is crucial, but in cases where relevant tests are performed and no causes are found or symptoms do not match any known disorders, a primary anxiety disorder is possible but should not be presumed. For such patients, the anxiety sensitivity index may have better predictivity for anxiety disorders while the Beck Anxiety Inventory may misleadingly suggest anxiety for patients with dysautonomia.

Mitochondrial cytopathies can have autonomic dysfunction manifesting as orthostatic intolerance, sleep-related hypoventilation, and arrhythmias.

== Mechanism ==
The autonomic nervous system is a component of the peripheral nervous system and comprises two branches: the sympathetic nervous system (SNS) and the parasympathetic nervous system (PSNS). The SNS controls the more active responses, such as increasing heart rate and blood pressure. The PSNS, for example, slows down the heart rate and aids digestion. Symptoms typically arise from abnormal responses of either the sympathetic or parasympathetic systems based on situation or environment.

== Diagnosis ==
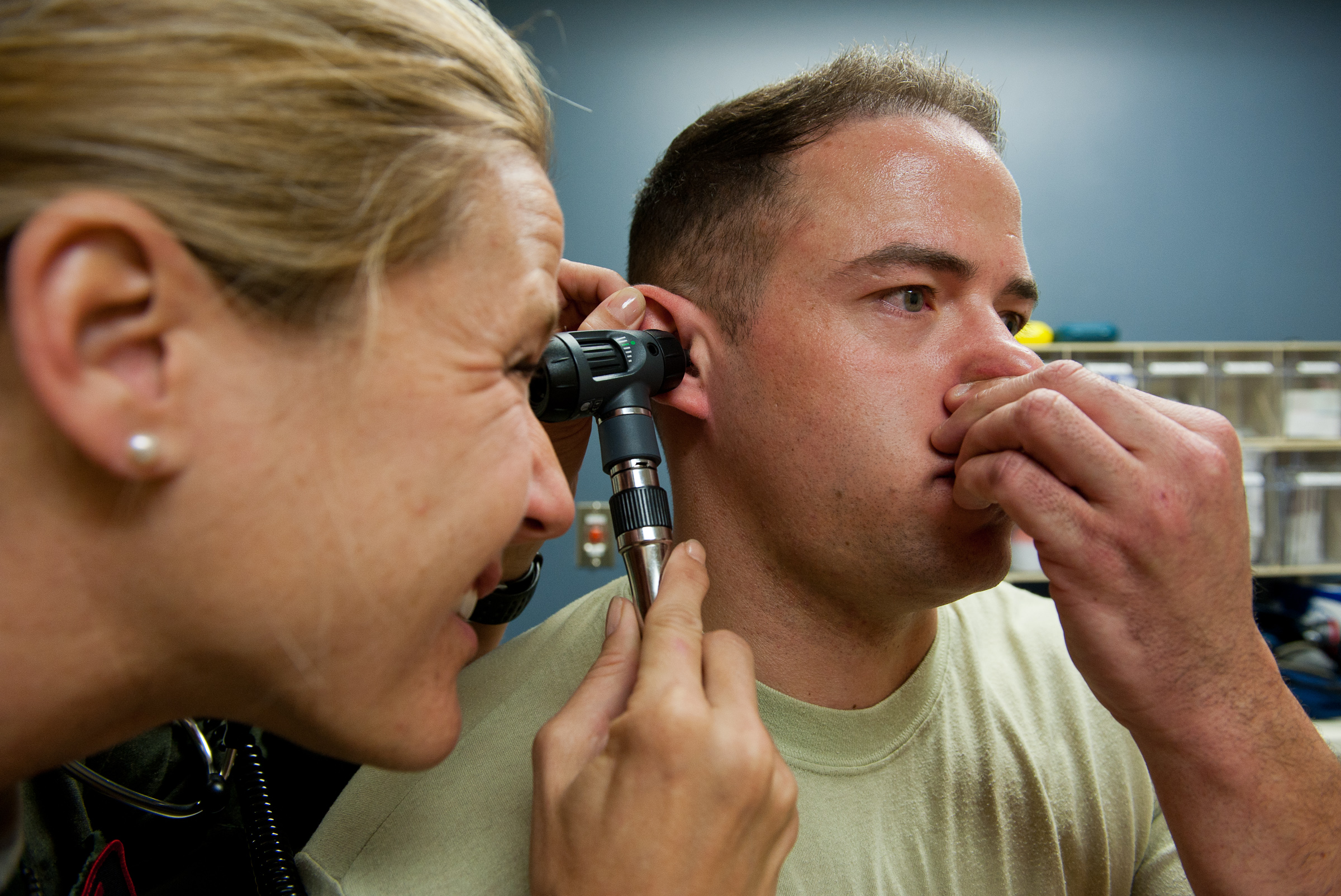
Valsalva maneuver

Diagnosis of dysautonomia depends on the overall function of three autonomic functions—cardiovagal, adrenergic, and sudomotor. A diagnosis should, at a minimum, include measurements of blood pressure and heart rate while lying flat and after at least three minutes of standing. The best way to make a diagnosis includes a range of testing, notably an autonomic reflex screen, tilt table test, and testing of the sudomotor response (ESC, QSART or thermoregulatory sweat test). Additional tests and examinations to diagnose dysautonomia include:

- Ambulatory blood pressure and EKG monitoring
- Cold pressor test
- Deep breathing
- Electrochemical skin conductance
- Hyperventilation test
- Nerve biopsy for small fiber neuropathy
- Quantitative sudomotor axon reflex test (QSART)
- Testing for orthostatic intolerance
- Thermoregulatory sweat test
- Tilt table test
- Valsalva maneuver

Tests to elucidate the cause of dysautonomia can include:

- Evaluation for acute (intermittent) porphyria
- Evaluation of brain and spinal magnetic resonance imaging for myelopathy, stroke and multiple system atrophy
- Evaluation of cerebrospinal fluid by lumbar puncture for infectious/ inflammatory diseases
- Evaluation of MIBG myocardial scintigraphy and DaT scan for Parkinson's disease, dementia with Lewy bodies and pure autonomic failure

=== Vegetative-vascular dystonia and Da Costa's syndrome ===
Particularly in Soviet and post-Soviet medical literature, a subtype of dysautonomia that particularly affects the vascular system has been called Vegetative-vascular dystonia. The term "vegetative" reflects an older name for the autonomic nervous system: the vegetative nervous system. While rooted in earlier concepts of neurasthenia, the diagnosis was crystallized by G.F. Lang's 'neurogenic theory' to describe a functional precursor to essential hypertension: a stress-induced autonomic dysregulation that Soviet physicians observed en masse amid the devastation of the war of annihilation on the Eastern Front. Despite official recognition by medical institutions in the USSR and some other Warsaw Pact countries (and their successor countries), it has also been described as a form of culture-bound syndrome.A similar form of this disorder was noticed during various wars, including the Crimean War and American Civil War, and among British troops who colonized India. It was called "irritable heart syndrome" (Da Costa's syndrome) in 1871 by American physician Jacob Mendes Da Costa.

== Management ==
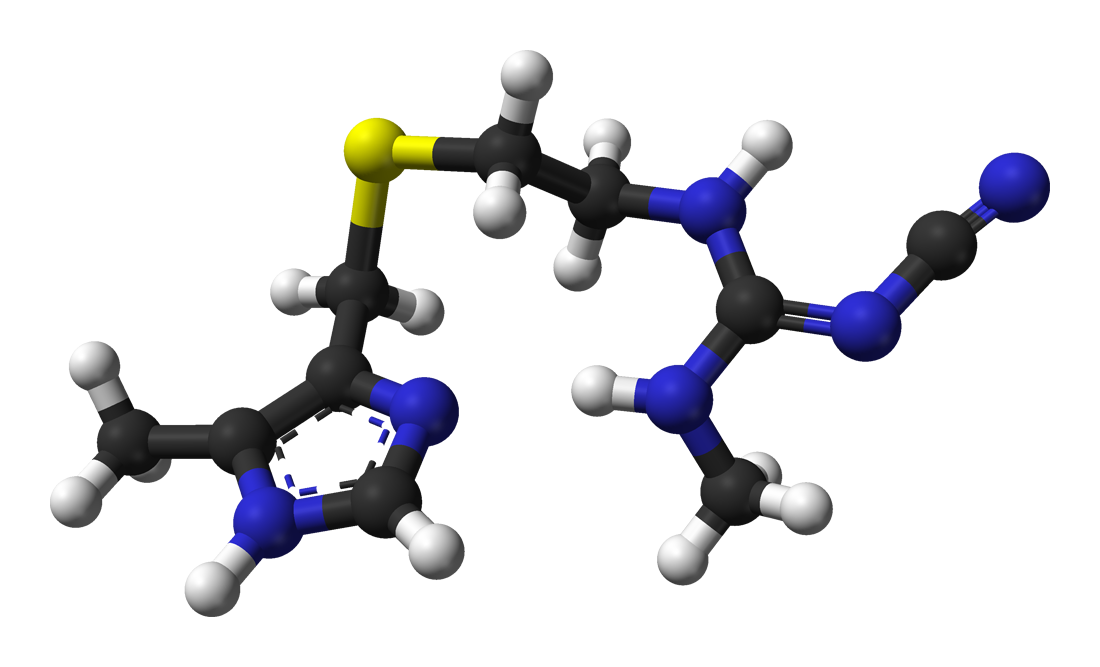
The H_{2} receptor antagonist cimetidine

Treatment of dysautonomia can be difficult; since it is made up of many different symptoms, a combination of drug therapies is often required to manage individual symptomatic complaints. In the case of autoimmune neuropathy, treatment with immunomodulatory therapies is done. If diabetes mellitus is the cause, control of blood glucose is important. Treatment can include proton-pump inhibitors and H_{2} receptor antagonists used for digestive symptoms such as acid reflux.

To treat genitourinary autonomic neuropathy, medications may include sildenafil (a guanine monophosphate type-5 phosphodiesterase inhibitor). To treat hyperhidrosis, anticholinergic agents such as trihexyphenidyl or scopolamine can be used. Intracutaneous injection of botulinum toxin type A can also be used in some cases. Transvascular autonomic modulation, a procedure similar to balloon angioplasty, is not approved in the United States to treat autonomic dysfunction.

== Prognosis ==
The prognosis of dysautonomia depends on several factors; people with chronic, progressive, generalized dysautonomia in the setting of central nervous system degeneration such as Parkinson's disease or multiple system atrophy generally have poorer long-term prognoses. Dysautonomia can be fatal due to pneumonia, acute respiratory failure, or sudden cardiopulmonary arrest. Autonomic dysfunction symptoms such as orthostatic hypotension, gastroparesis, and gustatory sweating are more frequently identified in mortalities.

== See also ==
- Autonomic neuropathy
- Dopamine beta hydroxylase deficiency
- Familial dysautonomia
- List of investigational orthostatic intolerance drugs
- Orthostatic intolerance
- Postural orthostatic tachycardia syndrome
- Reflex syncope
