= Tilt table test =

Medical procedure often used to diagnose dysautonomia or syncope

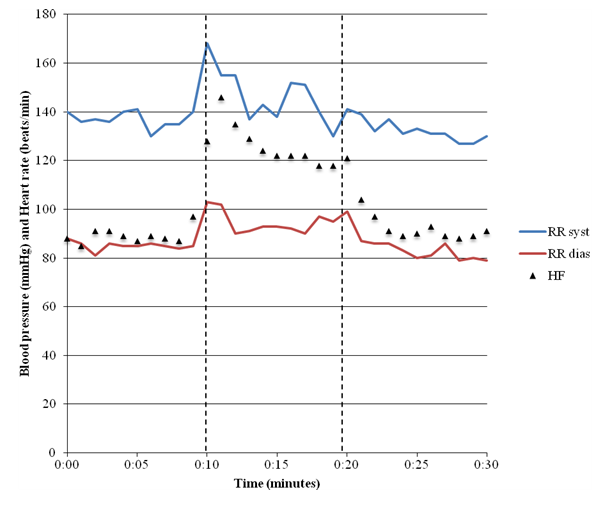
- Results of a tilt table test in a person with POTS
- MeSH: D018667

A tilt table is used to bring a patient in a vegetative state to an upright position. (This video is meant to illustrate the table and its operation, not the test.)

A tilt table test (TTT), occasionally called upright tilt testing (UTT), is a medical procedure often used to diagnose dysautonomia or syncope. Patients with symptoms of dizziness or lightheadedness, with or without a loss of consciousness (fainting), suspected to be associated with a drop in blood pressure or positional tachycardia are good candidates for this test.

The procedure tests for causes of syncope by attempting to cause syncope by having the patient lie flat on a special table or bed and then be monitored with ECG and a blood pressure monitor that measure continuous, beat to beat, non-invasively. The table then creates a change in posture from lying to standing.

== Indications ==
TTT may be indicated when the initial evaluation for syncope fails to provide a definitive, highly probable, or potential diagnosis, but instead raises clinical suspicion of reflex syncope, orthostatic hypotension, postural orthostatic tachycardia syndrome, or psychogenic pseudosyncope. TTT can help further investigate these conditions and aid in establishing an accurate diagnosis.

== Preparations ==
Before taking the test, the patient may be instructed to fast for a period before the test will take place and to stop taking any medications. On the day of the tilt table test, an intravenous line may be placed in case the patient needs to be given medications quickly; however, this may influence the results of the test and may only be indicated in particular circumstances. More recently, many investigators monitor cerebral perfusion pressure using mean flow velocity recording with transcranial Doppler ultrasound in supine horizontal position, during and after head-up tilt. An 18 MHz ultrasound transducer is placed on the temporal bone above the cheekbone, using headgear to hold the probe in place.

== Procedure ==
A tilt table test can be done in different ways and be modified for individual circumstances. In some cases, the patient will be strapped to a tilt table lying flat and then tilted or suspended completely or almost completely upright (as if standing). Most of the time, the patient is suspended at an angle of 60 to 80 degrees. Sometimes, the patient will be given a drug, such as glyceryl trinitrate (nitroglycerin) or isoproterenol, to create further susceptibility to the test. In all cases, the patient is instructed not to move. Symptoms, blood pressure, pulse, electrocardiogram, and sometimes blood oxygen saturation are recorded. The test either ends when the patient faints or develops other significant symptoms, or after a set period (usually from 20 to 45 minutes, depending on the facility or individualized protocol).

== Diagnostic symptoms ==
A tilt table test is considered positive if the patient experiences symptoms associated with a drop in blood pressure or cardiac arrhythmia. A normal person's blood pressure will not drop dramatically while standing, because the body will compensate for this posture with a slight increase in heart rate and constriction of the blood vessels in the legs. If this process does not function normally in the patient, the test could provoke signs and symptoms ranging from minor lightheadedness to a very severe cardiac episode, depending on the person.

A common side effect during tilt table testing is a feeling of heaviness and warmth in the lower extremities. This is due to blood pooling in the legs and, to onlookers, the patient's lower extremities may appear blotchy, pink, or red.

Dizziness or lightheadedness are also likely to occur in susceptible patients. Tilt table testing could provoke fainting or syncope. It is the purpose of the test to provoke these symptoms, in order to aid in diagnosis. It may not be appropriate, or indeed even possible, to stop the test before fainting occurs, as the drop in blood pressure or pulse rate associated with fainting can come on in seconds. This is why the patient's blood pressure and ECG should be continuously monitored during the test. If at any time in tilt table testing a patient loses consciousness, they will be returned to a supine or head down position and will be given immediate medical attention, which could include being given fluids or perhaps atropine or a sympathomimetic drug like epinephrine or ephedrine which will raise blood pressure and heart rate rapidly. In extreme cases, tilt table testing could provoke seizures or even cause the heart to stop. The heart resumes beating normally upon being returned to a flat or head-down position.

A drop in blood pressure during the tilt table test is indicative of orthostatic hypotension. A marked increase in heart rate in the absence of orthostatic hypotension is indicative of postural orthostatic tachycardia syndrome.

== See also ==
- Dix–Hallpike test
