= Chronic fatigue =

Chronic fatigue may refer to:

- Chronic fatigue, a long-term state of physical or mental exhaustion, a symptom of many chronic illnesses and of idiopathic chronic fatigue
- Myalgic encephalomyelitis/chronic fatigue syndrome, a discrete chronic medical condition characterized by post-exertional malaise, symptoms of profound intensity including fatigue, pain, and cognitive impairment and usually caused or precipitated by a systemic infection.
