= EDSS =

EDSS can refer to:

- Elmira District Secondary School, the high school serving the town of Elmira, Ontario, Canada and the surrounding area
- Expanded Disability Status Scale, a medical scale to monitor the disability changes in multiple sclerosis
