= Signs and symptoms of multiple sclerosis =

Neurological signs and symptoms

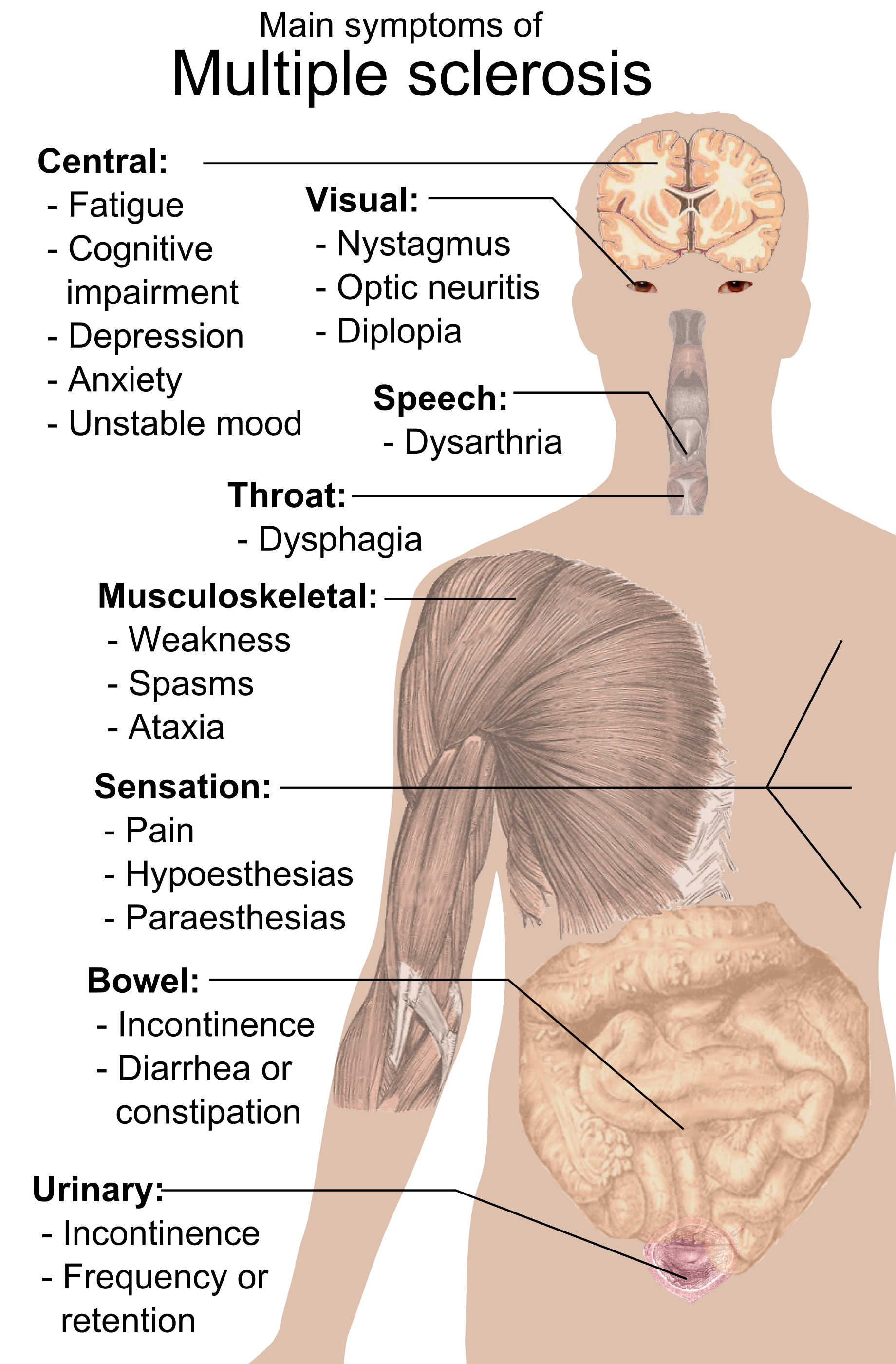
Main symptoms of multiple sclerosis

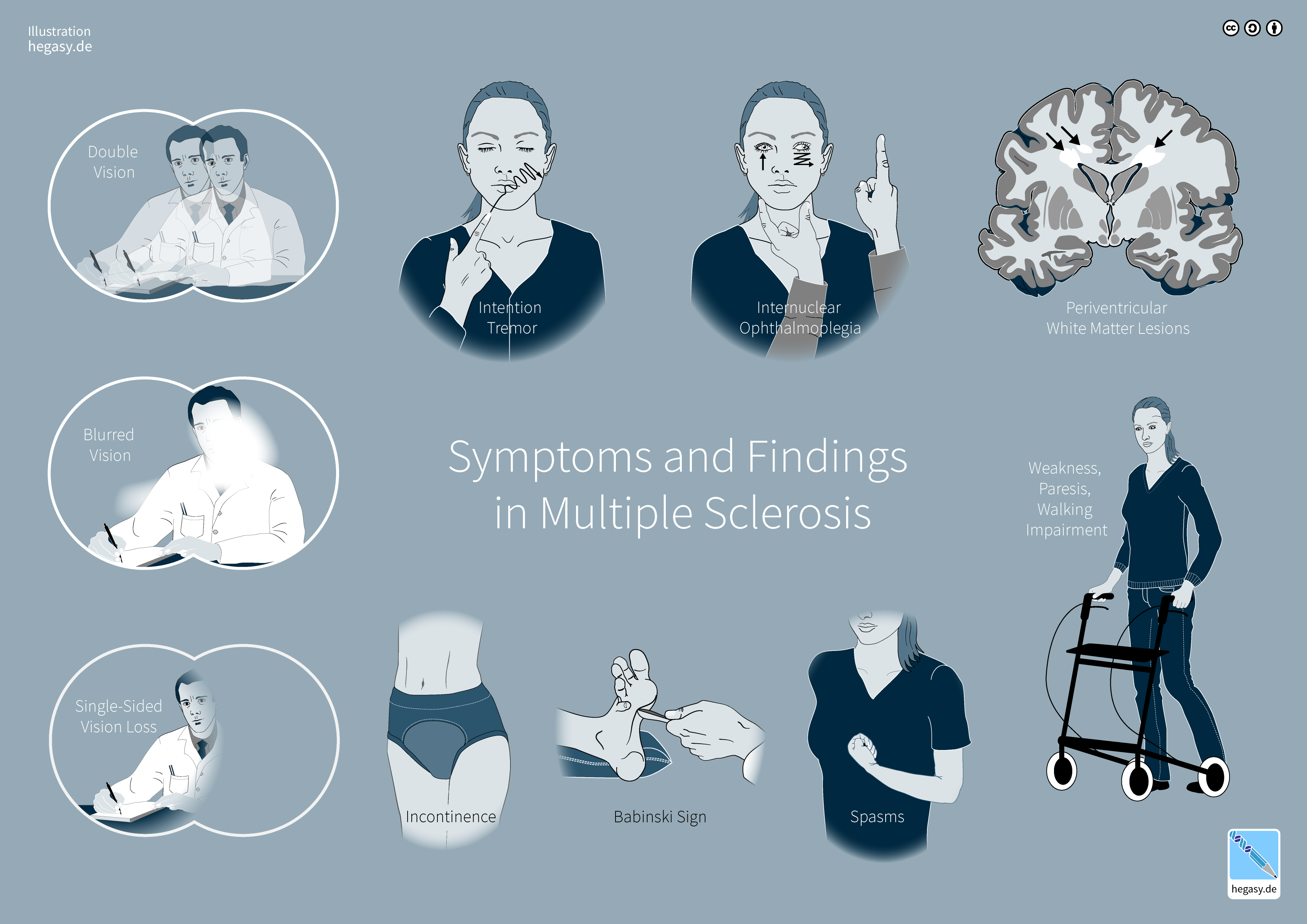
Symptoms and findings in multiple sclerosis

Multiple sclerosis can cause a variety of symptoms varying significantly in severity and progression among individuals: changes in sensation (hypoesthesia), muscle weakness, abnormal muscle spasms, or difficulty moving; difficulties with coordination and balance; problems in speech (dysarthria) or swallowing (dysphagia), visual problems (nystagmus, optic neuritis, phosphenes or diplopia), fatigue and acute or chronic pain syndromes, bladder and bowel difficulties, cognitive impairment, or emotional symptomatology (mainly major depression). The main clinical measure in progression of the disability and severity of the symptoms is the Expanded Disability Status Scale or EDSS.

The initial attacks are often transient, mild (or asymptomatic), and self-limited. They often do not prompt a health care visit and sometimes are only identified in retrospect once the diagnosis has been made after further attacks. The most common initial symptoms reported are: changes in sensation in the arms, legs or face (33%), complete or partial vision loss (optic neuritis) (20%), weakness (13%), double vision (7%), unsteadiness when walking (5%), and balance problems (3%); but many rare initial symptoms have been reported such as aphasia or psychosis. Fifteen percent of individuals have multiple symptoms when they first seek medical attention.

== Fatigue ==
Fatigue is very common and disabling in MS. Some 65% of people with MS experience fatigue symptomatology, and of these some 15-40% report fatigue as their most disabling MS symptom. A 2023 study found that effect on fatigue was the most valued attribute of MS therapy, and that participants would accept six additional relapses in 2 years and a decrease of 7 years in time to disease progression to improve either cognitive or physical fatigue from "quite a bit of difficulty" to "no difficulty."

The pathophysiology and mechanisms causing MS fatigue are not well understood.

MS fatigue can be affected by body heat and this may differentiate MS fatigue from other primary fatigue.

Perceived fatigue and fatigability (loss of strength) are regarded independently. Primary MS fatigue is sometimes called "lassitude". MS fatigue may reduce during periods of other MS symptom remission.

Knowledge of MS fatigue pathophysiology, diagnosis and treatment is very limited.

=== Primary vs. secondary ===
In some areas it has been proposed that fatigue be separated into primary fatigue, caused directly by a disease process, and secondary fatigue, caused by more general impacts on the person of having a disease (such as disrupted sleep).

=== Contributory factors to secondary fatigue ===
Factors such as disturbed sleep, chronic pain, poor nutrition, or even some medications can all contribute to secondary fatigue and medical professionals are encouraged to identify and modify them.

=== Association with depression ===
Early 2000s commentary saw a close relationship of secondary fatigue with depressive symptomatology. When depression is reduced fatigue also tends to reduce and it is recommended that patients should be evaluated for depression before other therapeutic approaches are used.

=== Correlation with brain changes ===
Studies have found MS fatigue correlates, not with lesion volume or brain atrophy, but with damage to NAWM (normal appearing white matter) (which will not show on normal MRI but will show on DTI (diffusion tensor imaging)). The correlation becomes unreliable due to ageing in patients aged over 65.

A 2008 study found MS fatigue correlated with lesion load and brain atrophy.

A 2024 study found results suggested that fatigue was not driven by neuroinflammation or neurodegeneration measurable by current structural MRI in early RRMS.

=== Medications ===
Medications used to treat MS fatigue include amantadine, pemoline, methylphenidate, and modafinil, as well as cognitive behavioral therapy (CBT) and psychological interventions of energy conservation; but their effects are limited. For these reasons fatigue is a difficult symptom to manage.

== Bladder and bowel ==
Bladder problems appear in 70–80% of people with multiple sclerosis (MS) and they have an important effect both on hygiene habits and social activity. Bladder problems are usually related with high levels of disability and pyramidal signs in lower limbs.

The most common problems are an increase in frequency and urgency (incontinence) but difficulties to begin urination, hesitation, leaking, sensation of incomplete urination, and retention also appear. When retention occurs secondary urinary infections are common.

There are many cortical and subcortical structures implicated in urination and MS lesions in various central nervous system structures can cause these kinds of symptoms.

Treatment objectives are the alleviation of symptoms of urinary dysfunction, treatment of urinary infections, reduction of complicating factors and the preservation of renal function. Treatments can be classified in two main subtypes: pharmacological and non-pharmacological. Pharmacological treatments vary greatly depending on the origin or type of dysfunction and some examples of the medications used are: alfuzosin for retention, trospium and flavoxate for urgency and incontinency, and desmopressin for nocturia. Non pharmacological treatments involve the use of pelvic floor muscle training, stimulation, biofeedback, pessaries, bladder retraining, and sometimes intermittent catheterization.

Bowel problems affect around 70% of patients. Around 50% of patients experience constipation and up to 30% experience fecal incontinence. Cause of bowel impairments in MS patients is usually either a reduced gut motility or an impairment in neurological control of defecation. The former is commonly related to immobility or secondary effects from drugs used in the treatment of the disease. Pain or problems with defecation can be helped with a diet change which includes among other changes an increased fluid intake, oral laxatives or suppositories and enemas when habit changes and oral measures are not enough to control the problems.

== Cognitive deficits ==
=== Deficits ===
Some of the most common deficits affect recent memory, attention, processing speed, visual-spatial abilities and executive function. Symptoms related to cognition include emotional instability and fatigue including neurological fatigue. Cognitive deficits are independent of physical disability and can occur in the absence of neurological dysfunction.

=== Appraisal ===
Reviews have recommended annual appraisal using the Symbol Digit Modalities Test (SDMT) or similarly validated test.

=== Effects ===
Severe cognitive impairment is a major predictor of a low quality of life, unemployment, caregiver distress, and difficulty in driving; limitations in a patient's social and work activities are also correlated with the extent of impairment.

=== Prevalence ===
Cognitive impairments occur in about 40 to 60 percent of patients with multiple sclerosis, with the lowest percentages usually from community-based studies and the highest ones from hospital-based.

Impairments may be present at the beginning of the disease. Probable multiple sclerosis patients, meaning after a first attack but before a secondary confirmatory one, have up to 50 percent of patients with impairment at onset. Dementia is rare and occurs in only five percent of patients.

=== Causation ===
Cognitive deficits have been linked to greater lesion load, white matter lesion location, microstructural injury, gray matter lesions, cortical and subcortical gray matter brain atrophy, and discrepant patterns of cerebral activation. Measures of tissue atrophy are well correlated with, and predict, cognitive dysfunction. Neuropsychological outcomes are highly correlated with linear measures of sub-cortical atrophy. Cognitive impairment is the result of not only tissue damage, but tissue repair and adaptive functional reorganization.

=== Postulated treatments ===
As of 2018 efficacy of possible interventions was low, inconclusive, or preliminary. Neuropsychological rehabilitation may help to reverse or decrease the cognitive deficits although studies on the issue have been of low quality. Acetylcholinesterase inhibitors are commonly used to treat Alzheimer's disease related dementia and so are thought to have potential in treating the cognitive deficits in multiple sclerosis. They have been found to be effective in preliminary clinical trials.

=== Prevention ===
Primary prevention by interventions and healthy lifestyles that promote brain maintenance has been proposed.

== Emotional ==
Emotional symptoms are also common and are thought to be both a normal response to having a debilitating disease and the result of damage to specific areas of the central nervous system that generate and control emotions.

Clinical depression is the most common neuropsychiatric condition: lifetime depression prevalence rates of 40–50% and 12-month prevalence rates around 20% have been typically reported for samples of people with MS; these figures are considerably higher than those for the general population or for people with other chronic illnesses. Brain imaging studies trying to relate depression to lesions in certain regions of the brain have met with variable success. On balance the evidence seems to favour an association with neuropathology in the left anterior temporal/parietal regions.

Other feelings such as anger, anxiety, frustration, and hopelessness also appear frequently. Suicide is a possibility, since it accounts for 15% of MS deaths.

Rarely psychosis may also be featured.

== Internuclear ophthalmoplegia ==
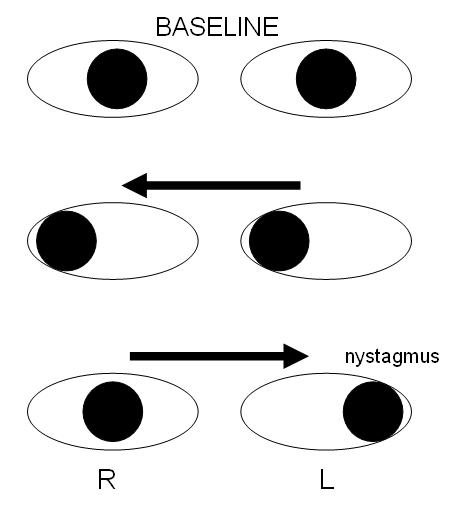
Schematic demonstrating right internuclear ophthalmoplegia, caused by injury of the right medial longitudinal fasciculus

Internuclear ophthalmoplegia is a disorder of conjugate lateral gaze. The affected eye shows impairment of adduction. The partner eye diverges from the affected eye during abduction, producing diplopia; during extreme abduction, compensatory nystagmus can be seen in the partner eye. Diplopia means double vision while nystagmus is involuntary eye movement characterized by alternating smooth pursuit in one direction and a saccadic movement in the other direction.

Internuclear ophthalmoplegia occurs when MS affects a part of the brain stem called the medial longitudinal fasciculus, which is responsible for communication between the two eyes by connecting the abducens nucleus of one side to the oculomotor nucleus of the opposite side. This results in the failure of the medial rectus muscle to contract appropriately, so that the eyes do not move equally (called disconjugate gaze).

Different drugs as well as optic compensatory systems and prisms can be used to improve these symptoms. Surgery can also be used in some cases for this problem.

== Mobility restrictions ==
Animation created from an 1887 photographic study of locomotion of a male MS patient with walking difficulties by Muybridge

Restrictions in mobility (walking, transfers, bed mobility etc.) are common in individuals with multiple sclerosis. Although this is not something constant it can happen when experiencing a flare up. Within 10 years after the onset of MS one-third of patients reach a score of 6 on the Expanded Disability Status Scale (EDSS), requiring the use of a unilateral walking aid, and by 30 years the proportion increases to 83%. Within five years of onset the EDSS is six in 50% of those with the progressive form of MS.

A wide range of impairments may exist in people with MS, which can act either alone or in combination to impact directly on a person's balance, function and mobility. Such impairments include fatigue, weakness, hypertonicity, low exercise tolerance, impaired balance, ataxia and tremor.

Interventions may be aimed at the individual impairments that reduce mobility or at the level of disability. This second level intervention includes provision, education, and instruction in the use of equipment such as walking aids, wheelchairs, mobility scooters and car adaptations as well as instruction on compensatory strategies to accomplish an activity — for example undertaking safe transfers by pivoting in a flexed posture rather than standing up and stepping around.

== Optic neuritis ==
Up to 50% of patients with MS will develop an episode of optic neuritis and 20% of the time optic neuritis is the presenting sign of MS. The presence of demyelinating white matter lesions on brain MRIs at the time of presentation for optic neuritis is the strongest predictor in developing clinical diagnosis of MS. Almost half of patients with optic neuritis have white matter lesions consistent with multiple sclerosis.

At five year follow-ups the overall risk of developing MS is 30%, with or without MRI lesions. Patients with a normal MRI still develop MS (16%), but at a lower rate compared to those patients with three or more MRI lesions (51%). From the other perspective, however, 44% of patients with any demyelinating lesions on MRI at presentation will not have developed MS ten years later.

Individuals experience rapid onset of pain in one eye followed by blurry vision in part or all its visual field. Flashes of light (phosphenes) may also be present. Inflammation of the optic nerve causes loss of vision most usually by the swelling and destruction of the myelin sheath covering the optic nerve.

The blurred vision usually resolves within 10 weeks but individuals are often left with less vivid color vision, especially red, in the affected eye.

A systemic intravenous treatment with corticosteroids may quicken the healing of the optic nerve, prevent complete loss of vision and delay the onset of other symptoms.

=== Asymmetry in thickness of RNFL as indicator of optic neuritis in MS ===
Asymmetry between the eyes in thickness of RNFL has been proposed as a strong indicator of optic neuritis in MS. RNFL data may indicate the pace of future development of the MS.

== Pain ==
Pain is a common symptom in MS. A 2013 study which systematically pooled results from 28 studies (7101 patients) estimated that pain affected 63% of people with MS. These 28 studies described pain in a large range of different people with MS. The authors found no evidence that pain was more common in people with progressive types of MS, in females compared to males, in people with different levels of disability, or in people who had had MS for different periods of time.

MS pain can be

- neuropathic (nerve) pain directly caused by MS. A lesion in the brain or spinal cord can cause nerves to fire inappropriately. Neuropathic pain is most commonly steady, and described as burning, tight, tingling, nagging, aching, throbbing, or even icy. However neuropathic pain can also be intermittent, and described as shooting, stabbing, or lightning bolt-like. Other unpleasant sensations may also occur.
- musculoskeletal (muscle/bone) pain, caused when muscles, bones, or joints experience decreased mobility, prolonged sitting, spasms, and other improper use and disuse.

MS patients may also be experiencing pain from comorbidity causes.

Pain can be severe and debilitating, and can have a profound effect on the quality of life and mental health of those affected. Certain types of pain are thought to sometimes appear after a lesion to the ascending or descending tracts that control the transmission of painful stimulus, such as the anterolateral system, but many other causes are also possible. The most prevalent types of pain are thought to be headaches (43%), dysesthetic limb pain (26%), back pain (20%), painful spasms (15-20%) such as the MS Hug, painful Lhermitte's phenomenon (16%) and Trigeminal Neuralgia (3%). These authors did not however find enough data to quantify the prevalence of painful optic neuritis.

Acute pain is mainly due to optic neuritis, trigeminal neuralgia, Lhermitte's sign or dysesthesias. Subacute pain is usually secondary to the disease and can be a consequence of spending too much time in the same position, urinary retention, or infected skin ulcers. Chronic pain is common and harder to treat.

=== Trigeminal neuralgia ===
Trigeminal neuralgia (or "tic douloureux") is a disorder of the trigeminal nerve that causes episodes of intense pain in the eyes, lips, nose, scalp, forehead, and jaw, affecting 2-4% of MS patients. The episodes of pain occur paroxysmally (suddenly) and the patients describe it as trigger area on the face, so sensitive that touching or even air currents can bring an episode of pain. Usually it is successfully treated with anticonvulsants such as carbamazepine, or phenytoin although others such as gabapentin can be used. When drugs are not effective, surgery may be recommended. Glycerol rhizotomy (surgical injection of glycerol into a nerve) has been studied although the beneficial effects and risks in MS patients of the procedures that relieve pressure on the nerve are still under discussion.

=== Lhermitte's sign ===
Lhermitte's sign is an electrical sensation that runs down the back and into the limbs and is produced by bending the neck forward. The sign suggests a lesion of the dorsal columns of the cervical cord or of the caudal medulla, correlating significantly with cervical MRI abnormalities. Between 25 and 40% of MS patients report having Lhermitte's sign during the course of their illness. It is not always experienced as painful, but about 16% of people with MS will experience painful Lhermitte's sign.

=== Dysesthesias ===
Dysesthesias are disagreeable sensations produced by ordinary stimuli. The abnormal sensations are caused by lesions of the peripheral or central sensory pathways, and are described as painful feelings such as burning, wetness, itching, electric shock or pins and needles. Both Lhermitte's sign and painful dysesthesias usually respond well to treatment with carbamazepine, clonazepam or amitriptyline. A related symptom is a pleasant, yet unsettling sensation which has no normal explanation (such as sensation of gentle warmth arising from touch by clothing).

== Reduced sense of smell ==
People with multiple sclerosis have been found to have reduced sense of smell, including lower olfactory thresholds.

== Sexual ==
Sexual dysfunction is one of many symptoms affecting persons with a diagnosis of MS. Sexual dysfunction in men encompasses both erectile and ejaculatory disorder. The prevalence of sexual dysfunction in men with MS ranges from 75 to 91%. Erectile dysfunction appears to be the most common issue documented in MS. It is thought to be due to alteration of the ejaculatory reflex which can be affected by neurological conditions such as MS. Sexual dysfunction is also prevalent in female MS patients, typically lack of orgasm, probably related to disordered genital sensation.

== Spasticity and spasms ==
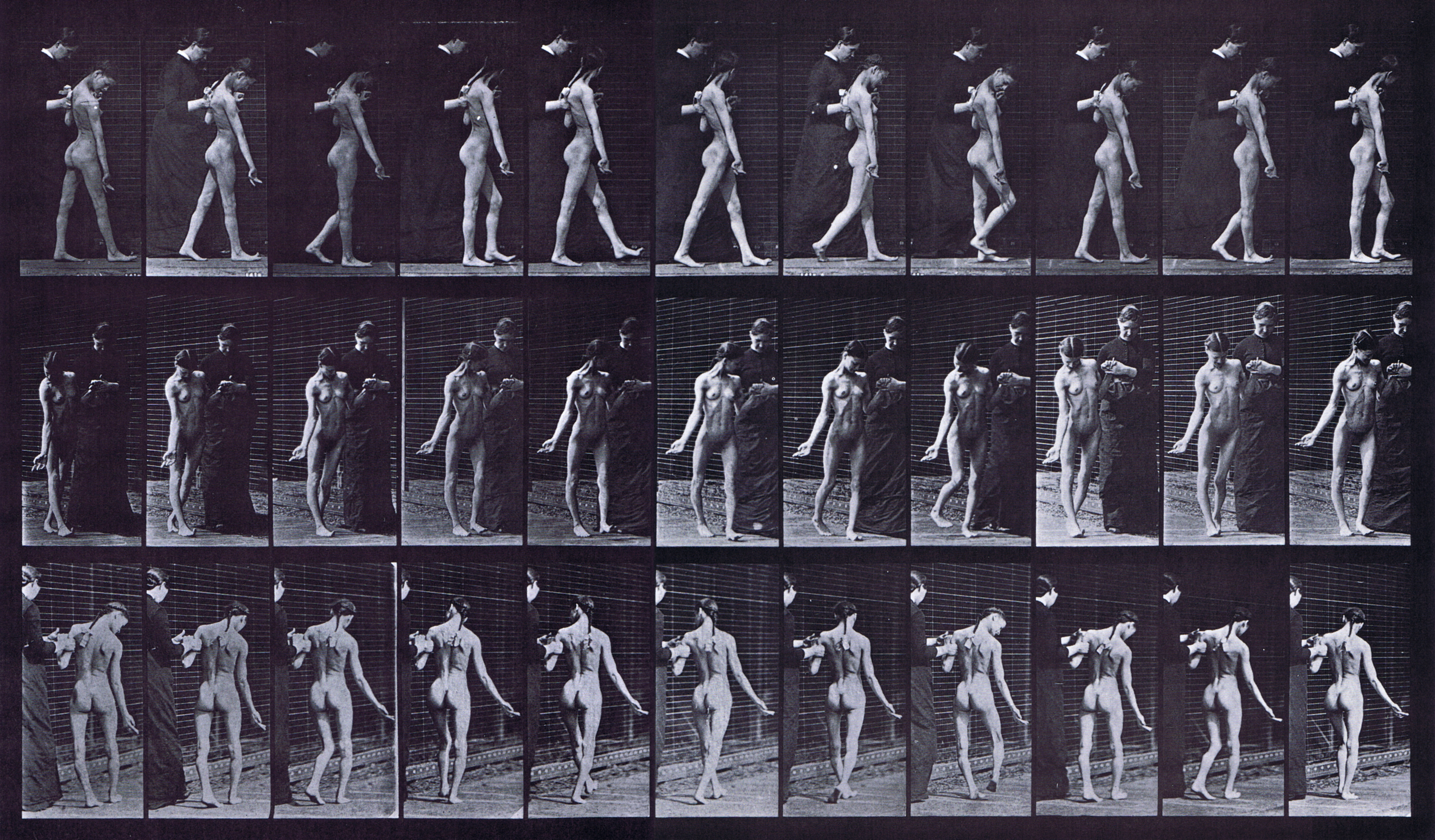
Photographic study of locomotion of a MS female patient with walking difficulties and spasticity created in 1887 by Muybridge

Spasticity is characterised by involuntary muscle movements (spasms), muscle stiffness, pain and restriction with certain movements or positions (causing difficulty in performing some activities), and a change in mobility or upper limb function.

Spasms affect about 15% of people with MS overall.

A physiotherapist can help to reduce spasticity and avoid the development of contractures with techniques such as passive stretching. There is evidence, albeit limited, of the clinical effectiveness of THC and CBD extracts, baclofen, dantrolene, diazepam, and tizanidine. In the most complicated cases intrathecal injections of baclofen can be used. There are also palliative measures like castings, splints or customized seatings.

== Speech and swallowing ==
Speech problems include slurred speech, decreased talking speed, and problems with articulation of sounds (dysarthria). Low tone of voice (dysphonia) may be caused by changes in diaphragm control.

A related problem, since it involves similar anatomical structures, is swallowing difficulties (dysphagia).

== Transverse myelitis ==
Some MS patients develop rapid onset of numbness, weakness, bowel or bladder dysfunction, and/or loss of muscle function, typically in the lower half of the body. This is the result of MS attacking the spinal cord. The symptoms and signs depend upon the nerve cords involved and the extent of the involvement.

Prognosis for complete recovery is generally poor. Recovery from transverse myelitis usually begins between weeks 2 and 12 following onset and may continue for up to 2 years in some patients and as many as 80% of individuals with transverse myelitis are left with lasting disabilities.

Though it was considered for many years that traverse myelitis was a normal consequence of MS, since the discovery of anti-AQP4 and anti-MOG biomarkers it is not. Now TM is considered an indicator of neuromyelitis optica, and a red flag against the diagnosis of MS.

== Tremor and ataxia ==
Tremor is an unintentional, somewhat rhythmic, muscle movement involving to-and-fro movements (oscillations) of one or more parts of the body. It is the most common of all involuntary movements and can affect the hands, arms, head, face, vocal cords, trunk, and legs. Ataxia is an unsteady and clumsy motion of the limbs or torso due to a failure of the gross coordination of muscle movements. People with ataxia experience a failure of muscle control in their arms and legs, resulting in a lack of balance and coordination or a disturbance of gait.

Tremor and ataxia are frequent in MS and present in 25 to 60% of patients. They can be very disabling and embarrassing, and are difficult to manage. The origin of tremor in MS is difficult to identify but it can be due to a mixture of different factors such as damage to the cerebellar connections, weakness, spasticity, etc.

Many medications have been proposed to treat tremor; however their efficacy is very limited. Medications that have been reported to provide some relief are isoniazid, carbamazepine, propranolol and gluthetimide but published evidence of effectiveness is limited. Physical therapy is not indicated as a treatment for tremor or ataxia although the use of orthese devices can help. An example is the use of wrist bandages with weights, which can be useful to increase the inertia of movement and therefore reduce tremor. Daily use objects are also adapted so they are easier to grab and use.

If all these measures fail patients are candidates for thalamus surgery. This kind of surgery can be both a thalamotomy or the implantation of a thalamic stimulator. Complications are frequent (30% in thalamotomy and 10% in deep brain stimulation) and include a worsening of ataxia, dysarthria and hemiparesis. Thalamotomy is a more efficacious surgical treatment for intractable MS tremor though the higher incidence of persistent neurological deficits in patients receiving lesional surgery supports the use of deep brain stimulation as the preferred surgical strategy.

== Sleep disturbance ==
Around half of people with MS say they experience disturbed sleep. Sleep disturbance is not regarded as a primary effect of the MS disease itself. Rather it is regarded as a secondary effect resulting from other factors that are themselves caused or exacerbated by MS, such as spasms, pain, anxiety, depression and high caffeine intake.

MS fatigue has been found to not correlate with sleep duration, but there was some correlation with insomnia and sleep quality. It may be that primary MS fatigue is unaffected by sleep characteristics, but that sleep deprivation correlates with secondary MS fatigue.

CPAP treatment in patients with MS and sleep apnea may reduce fatigue and improve the physical quality of life.
