= John F. Kurtzke =

American neuroepidemologist (1926-2015)

John Kurtzke
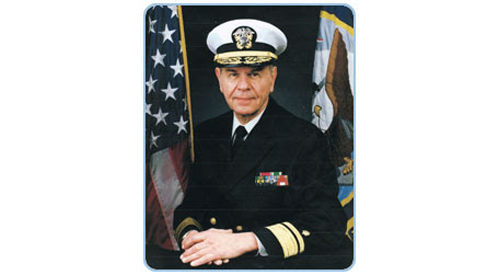
- Born: John Francis Kurtzke; September 14, 1926; Brooklyn, New York City, New York
- Died: December 1, 2015 (aged 89); Falls Church, Virginia
- Education: Weill Cornell Medical College
- Known for: Expanded Disability Status Scale
- Awards: 1999 Charcot Award, 1997 Dystel Prize
- Scientific career
- Fields: Neurology, Neuroepidemiology
- Workplaces: Georgetown University

Notes
- Obituary

John Francis Kurtzke (September 14, 1926 – December 1, 2015) was a neuroepidemiologist and Professor of Neurology at Georgetown University who is best known for his creation of the Expanded Disability Status Scale and for his research on multiple sclerosis (MS). After graduating from Cornell University Medical College in 1952, Dr. Kurtzke started his career in the field of Neurology as Chief of the Neurology Service at the Veteran's Affairs (VA) Medical Centers in Coatesville, Pennsylvania, from 1956 to 1963, and then in Washington, DC, from 1963 to 1995, where he became Professor of Neurology at Georgetown University. At the time of his death, he held the title of Professor Emeritus at Georgetown University.

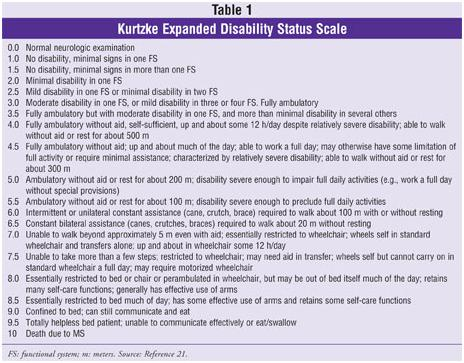
Kurtzke disability status scale KDSS

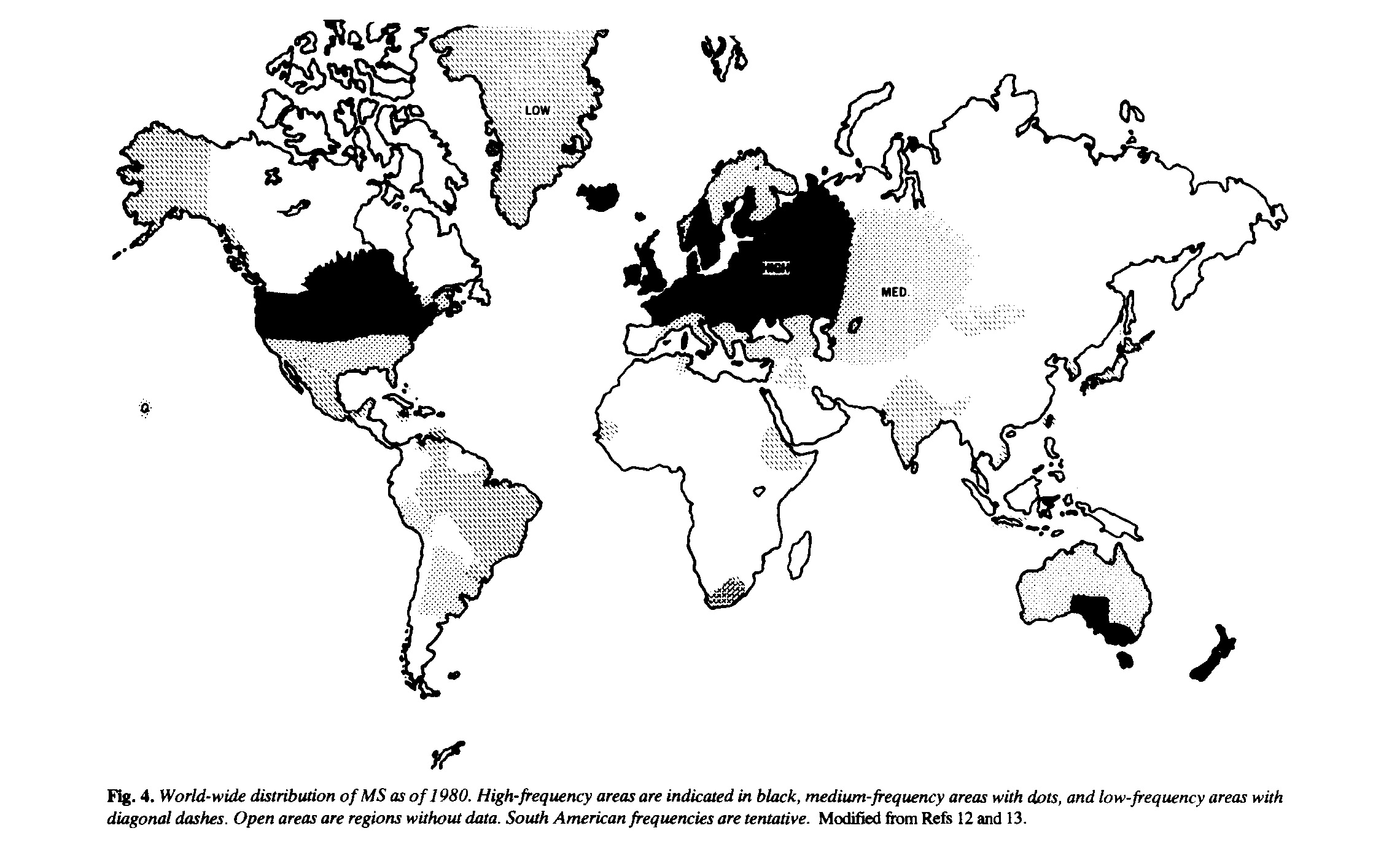
Kurtzke 1983 map of Multiple sclerosis in the world

Most of his work dealt with multiple sclerosis (MS). In particular, Dr Kurtzke is widely known for his Expanded Disability Status Scale or EDSS (a method of quantifying disability in multiple sclerosis) and for his pioneering work in the field of neuroepidemiology, a branch of epidemiology he helped to establish in 1967 with Dr. Len Kurland and Dr. Milton Alter.

He was an expert on geographical patterns of prevalence of multiple sclerosis. Kurtzke's results have played a major role in promoting the study of the viral component of MS susceptibility.

His awards include the 1999 Charcot Award by the Multiple Sclerosis International Federation and the 1997 Dystel prize for MS research awarded by the American Academy of Neurology.

In 2009, the Consortium of Multiple Sclerosis Centers (CMSC) and the American Academy of Neurology Foundation (AANF) have created the John F. Kurtzke, MD, FAAN, Clinician-Scientist Development Three-Year Award, a jointly-sponsored fellowship in multiple sclerosis research, "to honor the contributions of Dr. Kurtzke and inspire new MS healthcare professionals to follow in his path."

Like Klaus Lauer, J. Kurtzke has dedicated a large part of his work to the study of MS in the Faroe Islands, with extensive studies dealing with the British occupation of the islands, starting what the New York Times called the MS "medical detective story". He died on December 1, 2015.
