= Carl Aage Hilbert =

Danish Prefect of the Faroe Islands (1899–1953)

Carl Aage Hilbert

Carl Aage Hilbert (27 March 1899 – 17 October 1953), born in Copenhagen to Doretha Marie (née Barnucka) and Emil Christopher Hilbert, was the Danish Prefect of the Faroe Islands from 1936 until 1945. During this period, the Faroe Islands had the status of an amt (county) of Denmark.

== Career ==
Following the German occupation of Denmark on 9 April 1940, Hilbert was effectively isolated from the political authorities in Copenhagen. He played a crucial role in the civil administration of the islands during the British occupation during World War II, with which he co-operated. During his tenure, the Flag of the Faroe Islands (Merkið), rather than the Flag of Denmark (Dannebrog), was flown from Faroese vessels for Allied identification purposes because of the German occupation of Denmark.

He was succeeded by Cai A. Vagn-Hansen.

== Personal life ==
Hilbert was married at the Frederiksberg Church on 12 November 1921 to Gudrun Marie Kristine Nielsen, with whom he had two children: Niels-Ole, born 18 May 1932 and Birgit (18 May 1927 - 1 December 1999).

== See also ==
- 1946 Faroese independence referendum
