= British occupation of the Faroe Islands =

World War II occupation of the Faroe Islands

- Part of European theatre of World War II
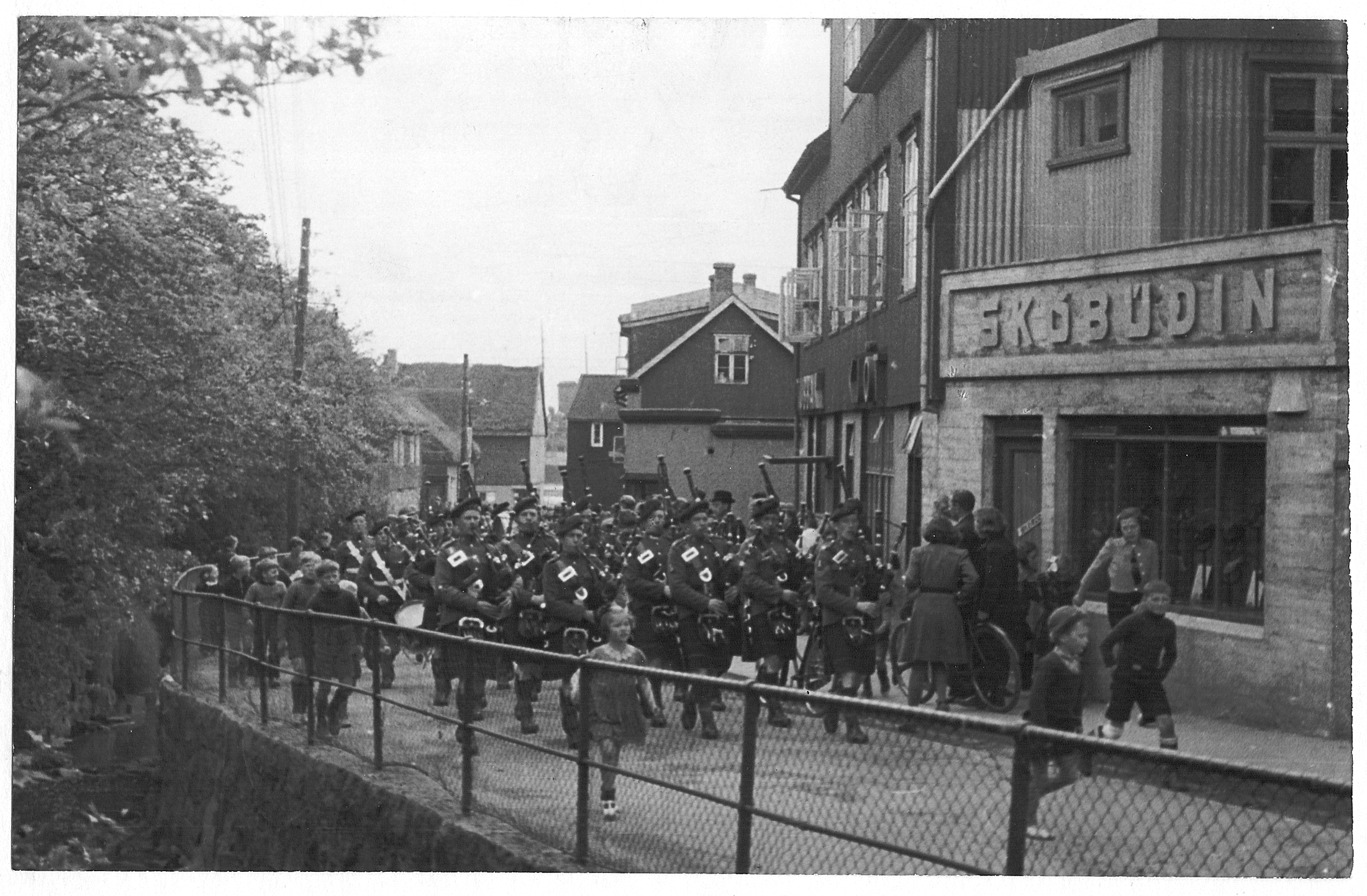
- British troops arrive in Tórshavn in 1940
Date	13 April 1940
Location	Tórshavn, Faroe Islands, Danish Realm
Result	Unopposed British landing
Territorial changes	United Kingdom assumes defence of the Faroe Islands for the duration; Merkið, the Faroese flag, adopted 25 April 1940

Belligerents
United Kingdom	Faroe Islands

Commanders and leaders
Charles Forbes; Thomas Sandall	Carl Aage Hilbert; Kristian Djurhuus

Strength
193 Royal Marines; 3 warships	local police constabulary

British occupation of the Faroe Islands during the Second World War, began shortly after the German Wehrmacht launched (9 April 1940) Operation Weserübung, the invasion of metropolitan Denmark and Norway. By 13 April 1940, the United Kingdom had occupied the strategically important Faroe Islands (part of Denmark) to forestall a German occupation of the archipelago. The Faroe Islands became part of the area of the British Northern Garrisons, a chain of islands across the Atlantic Ocean, from Orkney to Iceland. British troops left shortly after the war ended in 1945.

== Background ==
At the time of the Danish surrender in 1940, the Faroe Islands had the status of an amt (county) of the Danish Realm. The islands' local government consisted of the amtmand or county prefect, Carl Aage Hilbert, and an assembly, the Løgting. On the morning of 9 April, telegraphic communication between Denmark and the Faroe Islands ceased abruptly, but radio soon carried the news of the surrender to the Faroese. Valdemar Lützen had been the British honorary consul in the Faroese capital Tórshavn for 30 years.

Map of the Faroe Islands

Following the experience of the First World War, some German naval strategists, in particular Vice-Admiral Wolfgang Wegener, felt a defensive naval strategy was wrong and the best use of German naval strength would be to go on the offensive in naval warfare against the United Kingdom. Wegener and his disciples argued, Germany could have unrestricted access to the open seas only following conquest of Norway, Shetland, the Faroe Islands and Iceland, so to circumvent Britain's naval stranglehold, Scandinavian neutrality was an irrelevance. By 1925, Wegener had developed his ideas, which were published in a book, Die Seestrategie des Weltkrieges, in 1929. Wegener's ideas came to permeate German naval planning, even though it was not directed explicitly towards Britain until the spring of 1938.

Apparently the British Admiralty was unaware of such German interest in Scandinavia until April 1939 when the "Chief Diplomatic Adviser to His Majesty's Government", Robert Vansittart drew the First Sea Lord, Admiral Backhouse's attention to Wegener's book.

After the invasion and occupation of Denmark on 9 April 1940, that afternoon, Prime Ministers, Neville Chamberlain and Paul Reynaud held an Anglo-French Supreme War Council meeting in London. The SWC agreed that

Suitable measures were to be taken to occupy the Faroe Islands.

The next day, the First Lord of the Admiralty, Winston Churchill wrote to First Sea Lord, Admiral Pound, "We must also take our advantages in the Faroes."

== Occupation ==
To prevent the Germans from using the Faroe Islands as a base for cruisers and submarines that might engage in commerce raiding, British forces launched Operation Valentine. On 11 April, the sister ships HMS Havant and HMS Hesperus from the 9th Destroyer Flotilla of the Home Fleet were deployed to investigate the local political situation at Tórshavn. Also on 11 April, Deputy Chief of the Naval Staff, Tom Phillips appointed Lieutenant-Colonel Thomas B.W. Sandall to command a party of Royal Marines, Force Sandall, and proceed to the Faroe Islands to make defensive preparations at Kongshavn (present day Runavík) on Skálafjørður and at Tórshavn in cooperation with Prefect Hilbert. Force Sandall consisted of 13 officers and 180 men of the Royal Marines and was equipped with two 3.7" howitzers. It embarked the Royal Navy cruiser HMS Suffolk at Scapa Flow. The party included a new British Consul at Thorshavn, Frederick Mason. On the same day with anger sweeping the country, the brunt falling upon the Admiralty, Churchill addressed "a disturbed and indignant House of Commons". He announced that the Faroe Islands would be occupied,

We are also at this moment occupying the Faroe Islands, which belong to Denmark and which are a strategic point of high importance, and whose people showed every disposition to receive us with warm regard. We shall shield the Faroe Islands from all the severities of war and establish ourselves there conveniently by sea and air until the moment comes when they will be handed back to Denmark liberated from the foul thraldom into which they have been plunged by German aggression.

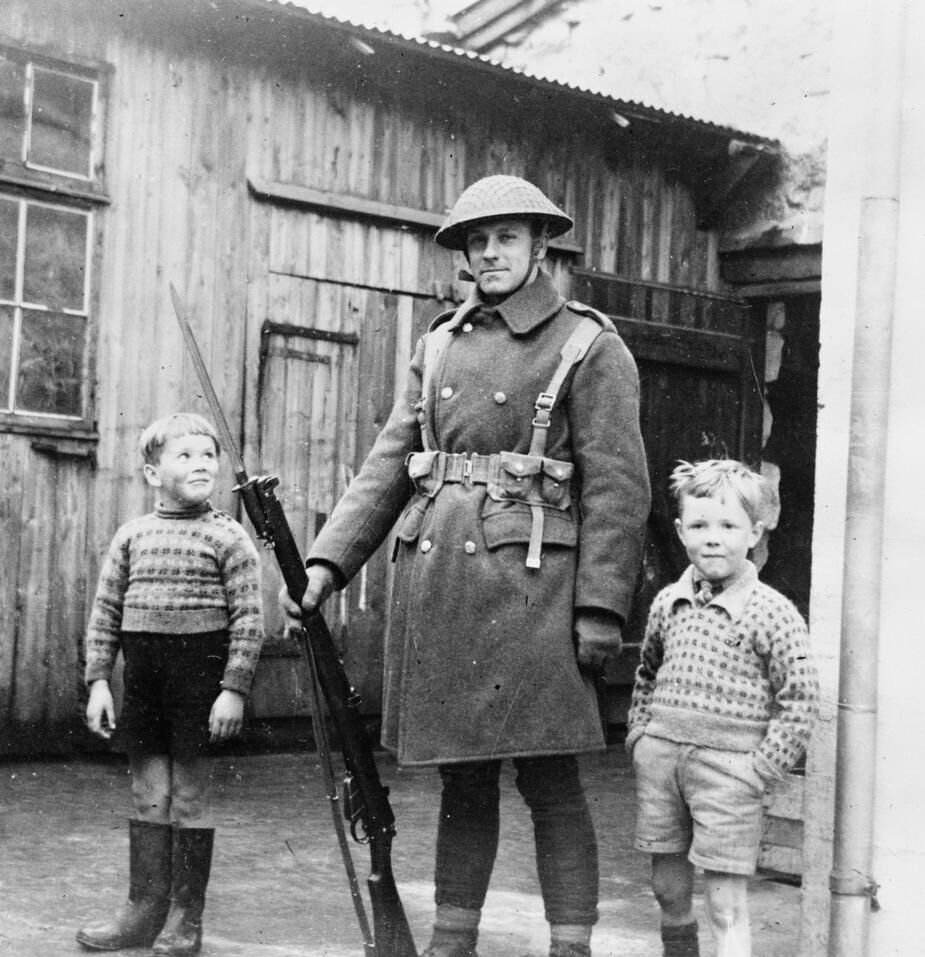
Two Faroese children stand with a British sentry outside the Quartermaster's stores at Tórshavn in 1940

By 12 April, HMS Suffolk was on passage to the Faroe Islands. An announcement was broadcast on BBC radio. An aircraft of the Royal Air Force (RAF) was seen over the Faroese capital Tórshavn on the same day. On 12 April, the two Royal Navy destroyers HMS Havant and HMS Hesperus carried out anti-submarine search operations prior to the entry into Tórshavn. Following a meeting with Prefect Hilbert and Kristian Djurhuus (president of the Løgting), an emergency meeting of the Løgting was convened the same afternoon. Pro-independence members tried to declare the independence of the Faroe Islands from the Kingdom of Denmark but were outvoted. An official announcement was later made announcing the occupation and ordering a night blackout in Tórshavn and neighbouring Argir, the censorship of post and telegraphy and the prohibition of the use of motor vehicles during the night without a permit.

On 13 April, HMS Suffolk was escorted into Tórshavn harbour by the destroyers Havant and Hesperus. Colonel T. B. W. Sandall and Frederick Mason then met the Danish prefect, Carl Aage Hilbert, who responded with what Sandall took to be a formal protest, although he maintained that owing to the occupation of Denmark he was unable formally to represent the Danish government. He duly accepted the British terms on the basis that they would not seek to interfere with the internal affairs of the islands. A formal protest was made by the Løgting. Faroes Force was disembarked.

== Subsequent events ==
=== The Faroese flag ===
After Germany occupied Denmark, the British Admiralty no longer allowed Faroese vessels to fly the Danish flag. This was of considerable significance given the importance of the fishing fleet to the Faroese economy. Following some intensive discussions between the British occupation authorities, the Faroese authorities and the Danish Prefect, as well as discussions between the UK Foreign Office and the Danish Embassy in London, on 25 April 1940 the British authorities recognised the Faroese flag – Merkið – as the civil ensign of the Faroe Islands.

=== Lovat Scouts ===
Faroes Force was replaced on 27 May by soldiers of the Lovat Scouts, a Scottish regiment. The Faroe Islands suffered occasional attacks by Luftwaffe aircraft but an invasion was never attempted. Drifting sea mines proved to be a considerable problem and resulted in the loss of numerous fishing boats and their crews. The trawler Nýggjaberg was sunk on 7 March 1942 near Iceland; 21 Faroese seamen were killed in the worst loss of Faroese lives in the war. Faroese ships hoisted the Faroese flag and painted FAROES / FØROYAR on the ships' sides for the Royal Navy to identify them as "friendly". In 1942, the Lovat Scouts were replaced by the Cameronians (Scottish Rifles).

=== Psilander affair ===
On 20 June 1940, six Swedish Navy ships arrived in the Faroe Islands. Four, HSwMS Psilander, Puke, Romulus and Remus, were destroyers bought from Italy and being sailed to Sweden. The fifth, the passenger ship Patricia, had been used to take the destroyer crew to Italy and was bringing civilian passengers back. The sixth, the tanker Castor, had been converted to naval status to bunker the ships. The Royal Navy seized all the ships under armed threat and moved them to Orkney. Although Sweden was neutral and not at war, Britain feared Germany would seize the ships if they continued to Sweden. After political negotiations Sweden secured their return. The Royal Navy had stripped equipment and caused damage to the ships, for which Britain later paid compensation. The Swedish commander was criticised by other Swedish officers for conceding the ships without resistance.

=== Civil Administration ===
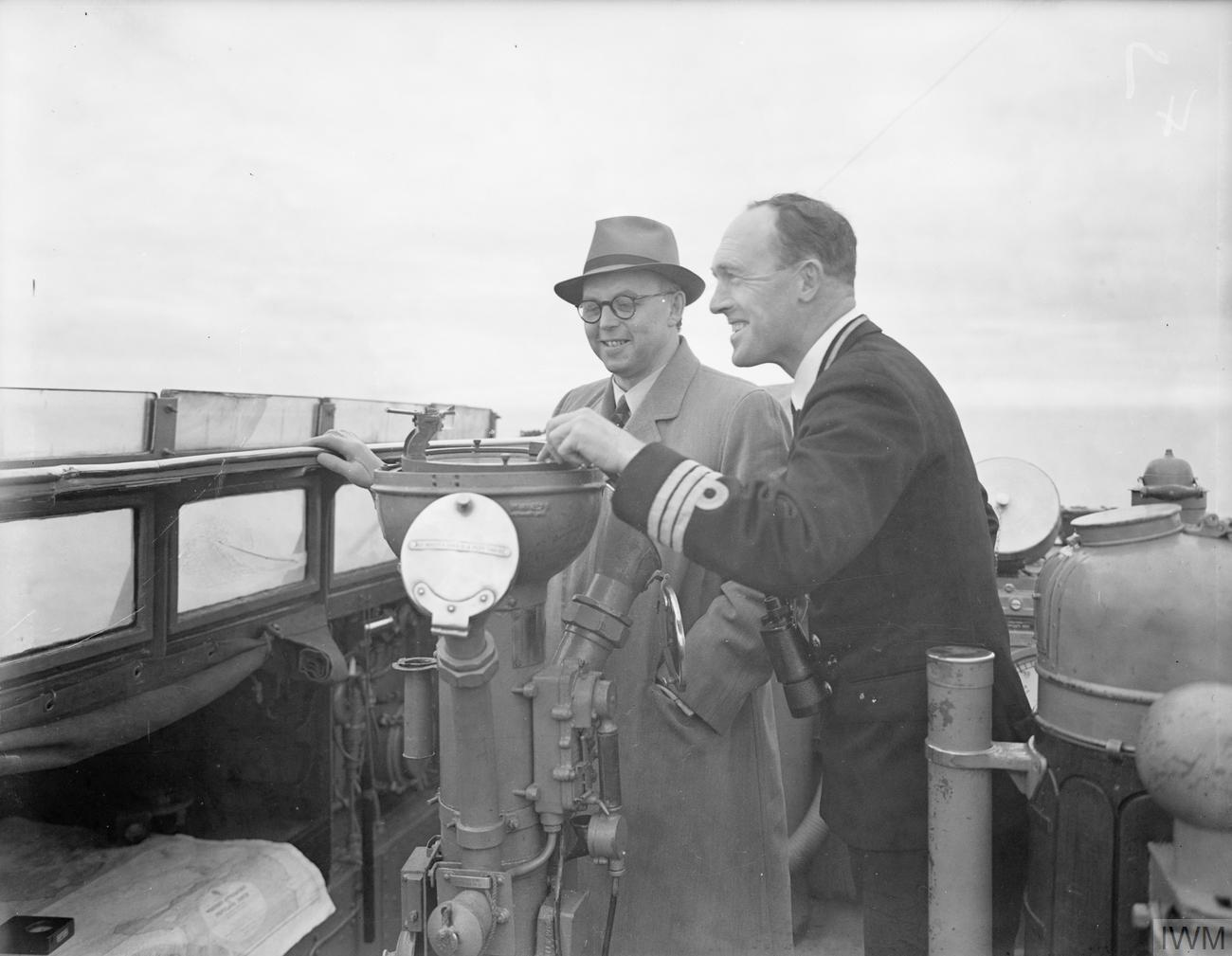
Amtmand C.A. Hilbert on the bridge of HMS Bedouin returning from the UK to the Faroe Islands in 1941

To prevent inflation, Danish krone banknotes in circulation on the islands were overstamped with a mark indicating their validity only in the Faroe Islands. The Faroese króna (technically the Danish krone in the Faroe Islands) was fixed at 22.4 kroner to one pound sterling. Emergency banknotes were issued and Faroese banknotes were later printed by Bradbury Wilkinson in England.

=== Airport ===
The only airfield on the Faroe Islands was built in 1942–43 on the island of Vágar by the Royal Engineers under the command of Lieutenant-Colonel William E. Law. RAF Vágar was used for refuelling, servicing and as an emergency landing base, on the North Atlantic air ferry route. Abandoned after the war, it was reopened as the civilian Vágar Airport in 1963.

The majority of British personnel in the Faroes were stationed at Vágar, mostly working on the construction of the airfield. Driving on the left was in force on the roads of the island of Vágar until British troops left the Faroe Islands.

=== Fatalities ===
More than 200 Faroese seamen lost their lives at sea during the Second World War, most due to the war. A monument in their memory stands in Tórshavn's municipal park. Several Faroese vessels were either bombed or sunk by German submarines or by drifting sea mines. Faroese fishing vessels harvested the sea near Iceland and around the Faroe Islands and transported their catch to the UK for sale.

At least one aircraft accident caused British fatalities. Five of a crew of six died in a crash of an RAF aircraft on 9 November 1942.

=== 1944 ===
From 1944, the British garrison was considerably reduced.

== Aftermath ==
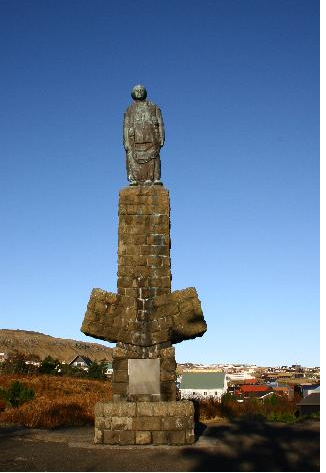
Minnisvarðin, in honour of the 210 Faroese men who died at sea during the Second World War. Erected in 1956

A plaque was erected by British veterans in Tórshavn Cathedral expressing thanks for the kindness shown to them by the Faroese people during their presence. Approximately 170 marriages took place between British soldiers and Faroese women; the British Consul, Frederick Mason (1913–2008) also married a local woman, Karen Rorholm. During the occupation, the Løgting was given full legislative powers, albeit as an expedient given the occupation of Denmark; Churchill refused to countenance a form change in the constitutional status of the Faroe Islands whilst Denmark was still occupied (unlike Iceland, which was allowed to hold a constitutional referendum in 1944), as the Faroes had been an integral part of the Kingdom of Denmark before the war (unlike Iceland, which was formally an independent kingdom in personal union with Denmark). Following the liberation of metropolitan Denmark and the end of the Second World War in Europe, the occupation was terminated in May 1945 and the last British soldiers left in September. The experience of wartime self-government left a return to the pre-war status of an amt (county) unrealistic and unpopular. The 1946 Faroese independence referendum led to local autonomy within the Danish realm in 1948.

The largest tangible sign of the British presence is the runway of Vágar Airport. Other reminders include the naval guns at the fortress of Skansin in Tórshavn, which served as the British military headquarters. After the occupation, instances of multiple sclerosis increased in the Faroe Islands, something which American and German neuroepidemiologists such as John F. Kurtzke and Klaus Lauer attribute to the presence of occupying British soldiers who were recuperating from multiple sclerosis on the islands.

In 1990, the Faroese government organised British Week, a celebration of the 50th anniversary of the friendly occupation. The celebration was attended by HMS Brilliant and a Royal Marines band. Sir Frederick Mason, the former wartime British consul to the Faroes, was also present, aged 76.

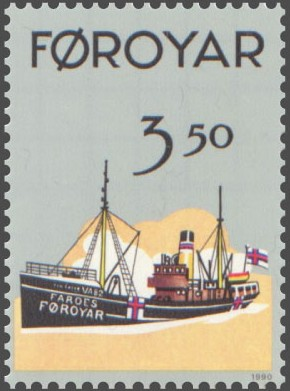
The trawler Nýggjaberg, which was lost on 7 March 1942

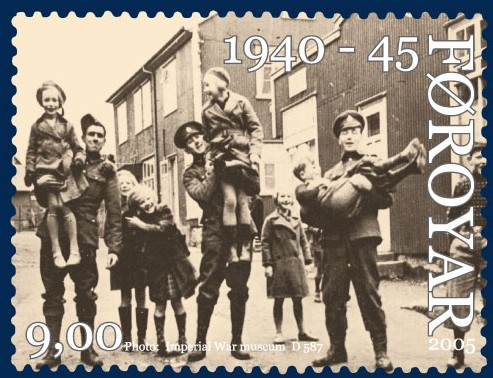
2005 Faroese stamp commemorating friendly relations between British soldiers and the Faroese

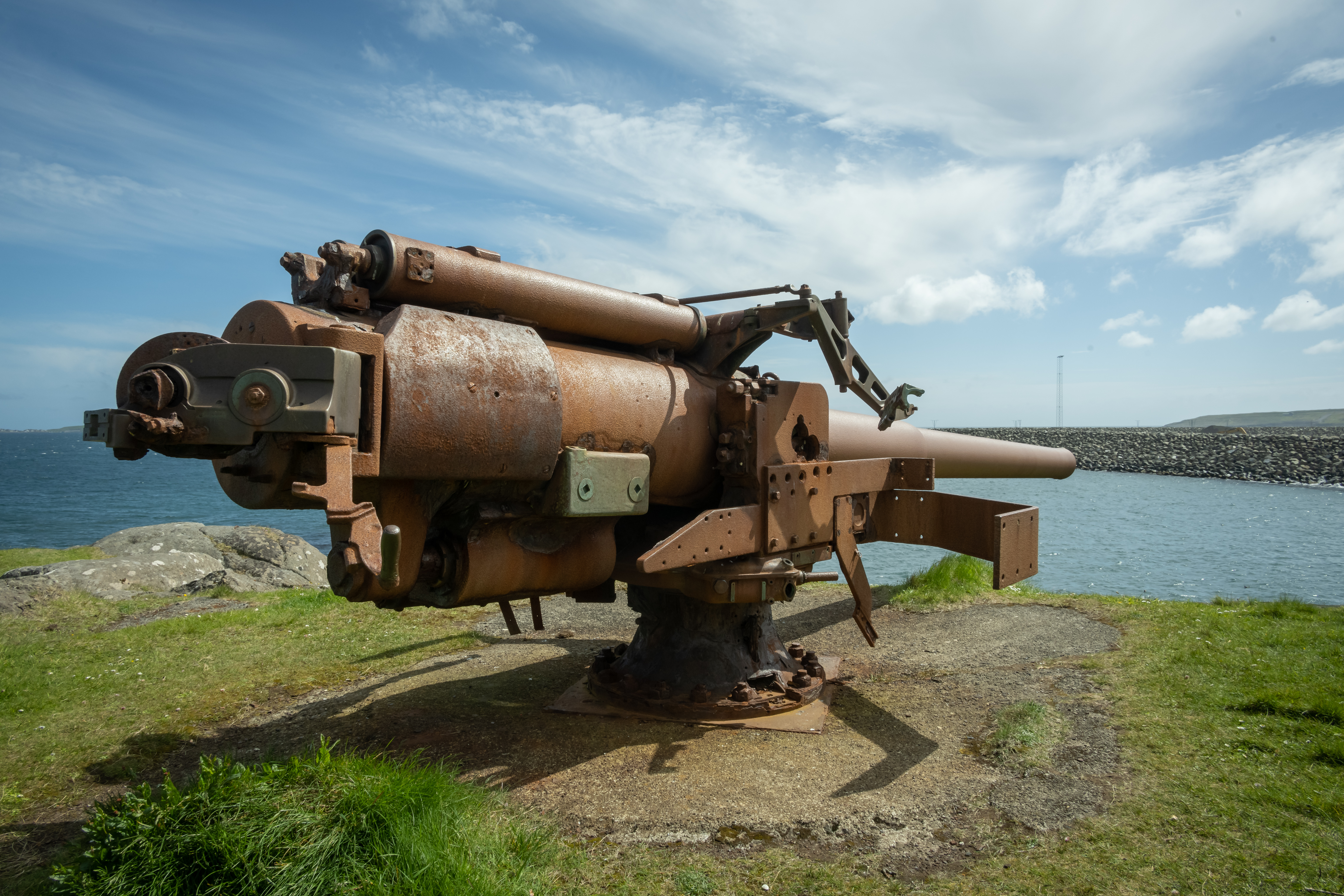
British Second World War naval gun, Skansin fortress, Tórshavn

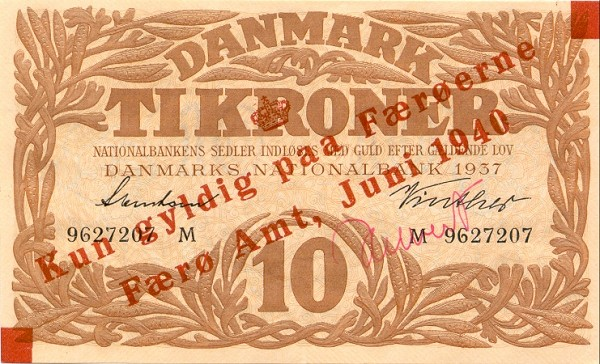
Danish 10 kroner banknote with June 1940 overstamp

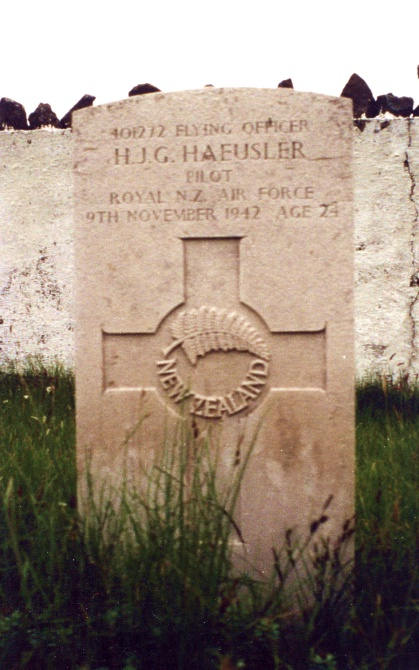
Grave of F/O H. J. G. Haeusler (Note: The gravestone of the Royal New Zealand Air Force pilot Flying Officer H. J. G. Haeusler, aged 24, near Vágar Airport.)

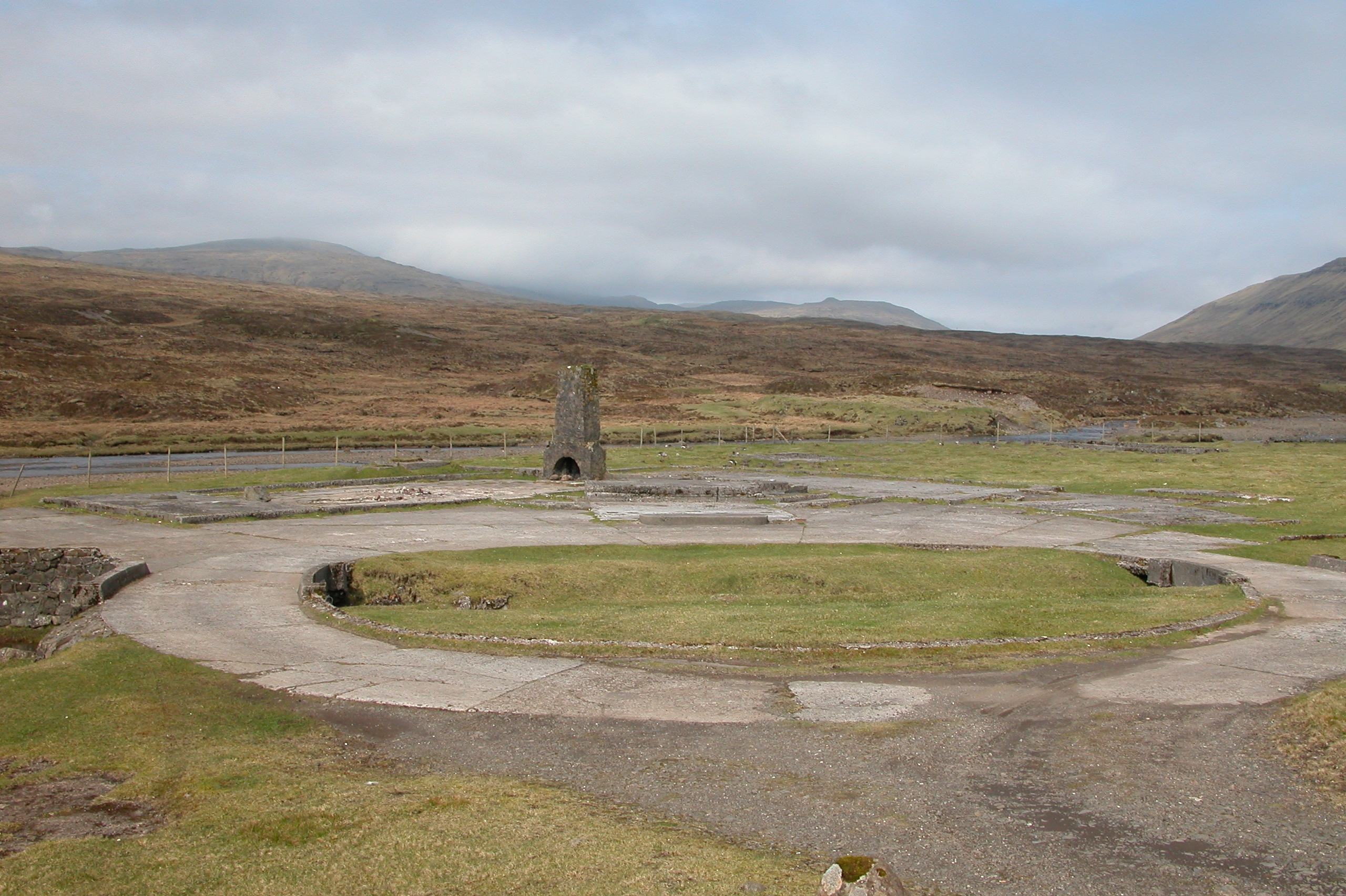
Remains of the British barracks at Vágar Airport

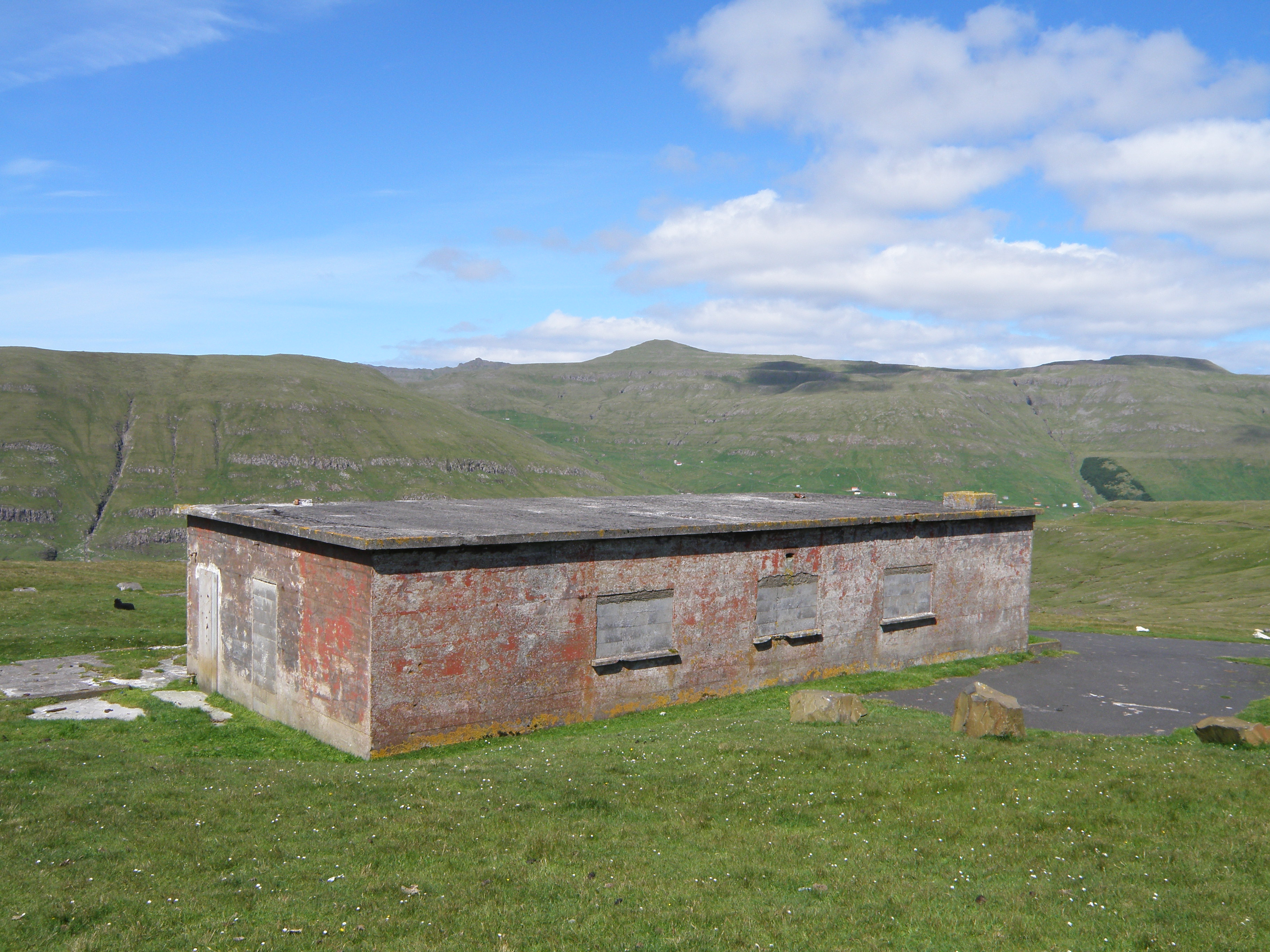
British pillbox on Eggjarnar near Vágur in Suðuroy

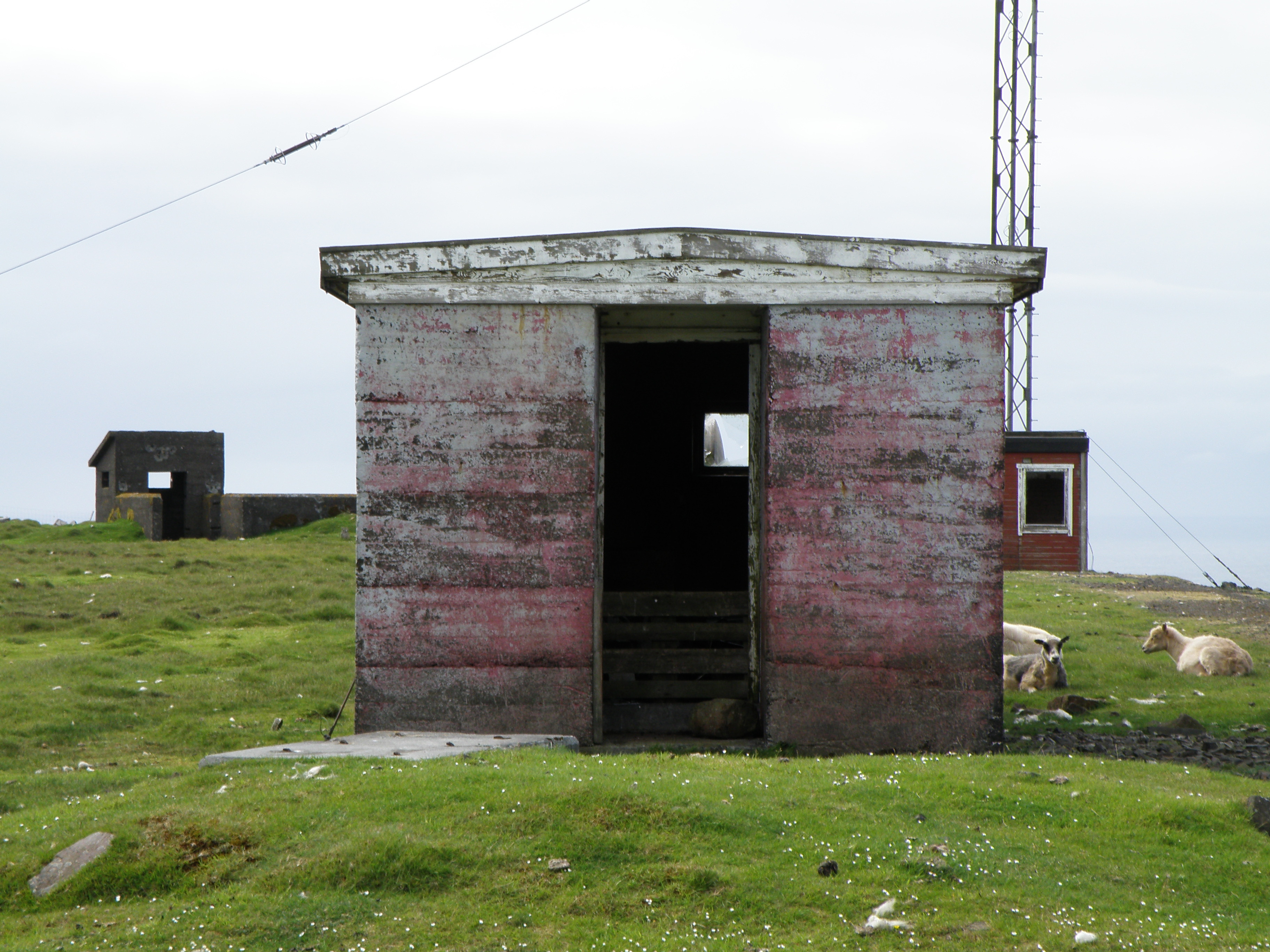
British pillboxes or bunkers in Akraberg, the southernmost place in Suðuroy and the Faroe Islands

== See also ==
- British invasion of Iceland
- Denmark in World War II
- Faroe Islands–United Kingdom relations
- Politics of the Faroe Islands
