= Idiopathic chronic fatigue =

Abnormal fatigue of unknown origin that persists for at least 6 months

- Other names: Chronic idiopathic fatigue (CIF), insufficient/idiopathic fatigue (ISF), unexplained chronic fatigue
- Specialty: Primary care
- Symptoms: Long-term fatigue
- Usual onset: Acquired (not lifelong)
- Duration: At least six consecutive months
- Causes: Unknown
- Diagnostic method: Based on symptoms; diagnosis of exclusion requiring laboratory evaluation, physical and biopsychosocial assessment
- Differential diagnosis: Occupational burnout; chronic fatigue due to a known medical condition such as chronic fatigue syndrome, overtraining
- Treatment: Symptomatic
- Frequency: 6.2 to 64.2 per 1000

Idiopathic chronic fatigue (ICF) or chronic idiopathic fatigue or insufficient/idiopathic fatigue is a term used for cases of unexplained fatigue that have lasted at least six consecutive months and which do not meet the criteria for myalgic encephalomyelitis/chronic fatigue syndrome (ME/CFS). Such fatigue is widely understood to have a profound effect on the lives of patients who experience it.

== Classification ==
ICF does not have a dedicated diagnostic code in the World Health Organization's ICD-11 classification.

ICF is sometimes diagnosed under physical symptom classifications such as MG22 (Fatigue) in the ICD-11, and R53.8 (Other malaise and fatigue) in the ICD-10. This allows ICF to be coded as fatigue or unspecified chronic fatigue, and help distinguish it from other forms of fatigue including cancer-related fatigue, chronic fatigue syndrome, fatigue due to depression, fatigue due to old age, weakness/asthenia, and in the ICD-10, also from fatigue lasting under 6 months. The ICD-11 MG22 Fatigue code is also shared with lethargy, and exhaustion, which may not be as long lasting.

The WHO does not recognize any kind of fatigue-based psychiatric illness (unless it is accompanied by related psychiatric symptoms).

== Signs and symptoms ==
- Clinically evaluated fatigue
- New or definite onset (not lifelong)
- Fatigue persists or is relapsing for six consecutive months or longer
- Fails to meet the criteria for chronic fatigue syndrome
- The cause is unknown (not resulting from another medical condition)

== Diagnosis ==
There are no agreed upon international criteria for idiopathic chronic fatigue, however the CDC's 1994 Idiopathic Chronic Fatigue criteria, known as the Fukuda ICF criteria, are commonly used.

=== Exclusions ===
- Fatigue which begins within 2 years of a substance use disorder (addiction) or at any time after
- Chronic fatigue syndrome
- Fatigue caused by an active medical condition
- Major depression with psychotic or melancholic features
- Bipolar disorder
- Schizophrenia or schizophrenia-related disorders
- Delusional disorders
- The eating disorders anorexia nervosa and bulimia nervosa
- Occupational stress or other life stress and burnout
- Domestic violence
- Fatigue caused as a known side effect of medication
- Fatigue caused by a previous medical condition that may not be fully resolved

Other medical causes of fatigue must also be ruled out before a diagnosis of ICF can be made. These include

- Infectious diseases including viruses and TB
- Chronic fatigue syndrome
- Vascular diseases (affecting heart and circulation)
- Toxins and drug effects including poisons and substance use (addiction)
- Diseases affecting the lungs, including chronic obstructive pulmonary disease (COPD)
- Endocrine and metabolic problems, e.g., thyroid diseases and diabetes
- Diseases involving benign or cancerous tumours, including cancer fatigue
- Anaemia, lupus, and certain autoimmune or neurological diseases
- Dementia (any form)
- Severe obesity (a body mass index greater than 45)

2023 guidance for fatigue stated that when unexplained, clinically evaluated chronic fatigue could be separated into ME/CFS and ICF.

=== Differential diagnosis ===
==== Differences from chronic fatigue ====
ICF differs from other forms of chronic fatigue since it is unexplained rather than linked to a medical or psychological illness (for example, diabetes or depression). This means that ICF patients have reduced treatment options: there is no underlying disease or known cause that could be treated in order to reduce the degree of fatigue, which results in a poorer prognosis for ICF.

In ICF, the fatigue lasts for a minimum of six months, but chronic fatigue is usually (but not always) considered to last for a minimum of six months to be considered chronic, and if lasting between one and six months it is considered prolonged fatigue.

Chronic fatigue is the term used when medical tests and a mental and physical assessment has not yet been carried out. ICF can only be diagnosed after these are done and the results show no underlying untreated cause.

==== Differential diagnosis from chronic fatigue syndrome ====
Chronic fatigue syndrome (CFS) requires the additional symptoms of:

1. post-exertional malaise (significantly worsening symptoms with activity which results in a significant reduction in daily activities, which may be delayed by up to 3 days)
2. sleep dysfunction
3. either:
  - cognitive problems, or
  - orthostatic intolerance.

A range of other symptoms commonly result from CFS including headaches, muscle and joint pain, and low-grade fever.

ICF requires:

1. only one symptom: chronic fatigue
2. does not need a significant reduction in activities: some people are able to push through the fatigue to continue activities
3. is only diagnosed if CFS symptoms are not met.

Prevalence of ICF is between 3–15%, which is two to ten times higher than CFS. Older age at onset is more common in ICF, particularly from age 50, while in CFS age at onset is typically 16–35 years old.

The recovery rate within a year is significantly higher for ICF patients at 30–50% compared to under 10% in CFS.

ICF is categorized within general signs and symptoms by the World Health Organization, while CFS is categorized as a neurological disease.

Ability to tolerate exertion including exercise has been shown to be greater in ICF patients compared to CFS patients, particularly on consecutive days, and this applies to both men and women.

Severity of illness in ICF is typically less than in CFS, with some relatively small studies finding no severe ICF patients; the same studies found fibromyalgia was significantly less common in ICF.

==== Differences from neurasthenia ====
Neurasthenia was a diagnosis in the World Health Organization's ICD-10, but deprecated, and thus no longer diagnosable, in ICD-11. It also is no longer included as a diagnosis in the American Psychiatric Association's Diagnostic and Statistical Manual of Mental Disorders.

- Neurasthenia consisted of a large number of symptoms, typically patients had a mix of physical and psychological complaints for example anxiety, stress-related headaches, heart palpitations, depressed mood, fatigue, lethargy, insomnia, restlessness, and weariness. Fatigue was common but not essential. ICF consists of the single symptom of fatigue, which may be either mental or physical or both, and may be described in many different ways including as "exhaustion".
- ICF has no known cause, and psychological factors such as stress have been ruled out, but neurasthenia was believed to be caused by the stresses of the modern age, and psychological or psychosocial factors were seen as important.
- Neurasthenia has been very rarely reported since the 21st century, and was deprecated in the World Health Organization's most recent International Classification of Diseases, known as the ICD-11. Neurasthenia had previously been categorized as a psychological illness, and originally as neurological. ICF is not psychological—the WHO does not have a classification for any fatigue-only psychiatric illness.

== Management ==
Idiopathic chronic fatigue is typically managed in general medicine rather than by referral to a specialist. There is no cure, no approved drug, and treatment options are limited. Management may involve a form of counseling, or antidepressant medication, although some patients may prefer herbal or alternative remedies.

=== Counseling ===
A form of counseling known as cognitive behavioral therapy may help some people manage or cope with idiopathic chronic fatigue.

=== Medication ===
There are no approved drugs for ICF.

==== Antidepressants ====
Antidepressants drugs such as tricyclic antidepressants (TCAs) or selective serotonin reuptake inhibitors (SSRIs) may be appropriate if symptoms are exacerbated by suspected or diagnosed serotonin related health issues, such as depression.

==== Alternative and complementary treatments ====
Only limited trials had been conducted for alternative and complementary treatments; there is no clear evidence of these treatments being effective for ICF due to a lack of randomized controlled trials.

== Prognosis ==
Between 30% and just under 50% of patients recover within one year.

== Epidemiology ==
Fatigue is common in the general population and often caused by overwork, too much activity, or a specific illness or disease. Around 20% of patients who visit their clinician report fatigue. Prolonged fatigue is fatigue that persists for more than a month, and chronic fatigue is fatigue that lasts at least six consecutive months, which may be caused by a physical or psychological illness, or may be idiopathic (no known cause). Chronic fatigue with a known cause is twice as common as idiopathic chronic fatigue.

Idiopathic chronic fatigue affects between 2.4% and 6.42% of patients, with females more likely to be affected than men. Age at onset is typically over 50 years of age. A significant number of patients present with idiopathic chronic fatigue as part of a mix of medically unexplained symptoms, while others present with a primary problem of fatigue alone.
