= Klaus Lauer =

German neuroepidemologist (born 1950)

Klaus Lauer (born 1950) is a German neuroepidemologist, mostly known for his work on multiple sclerosis (MS).

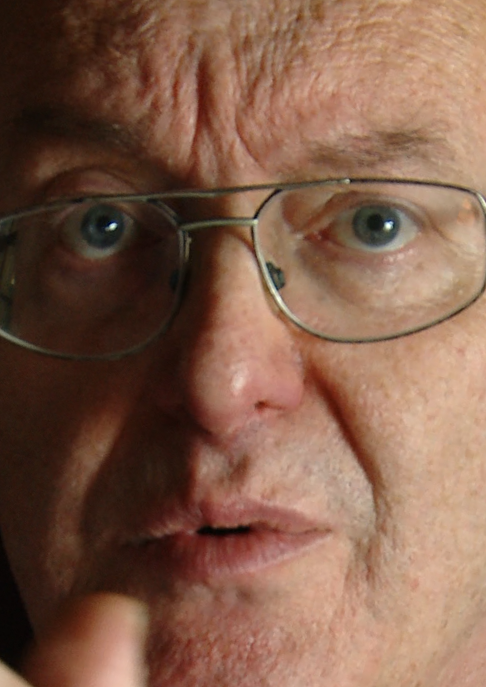
Klaus Lauer

== Early life ==
Klaus Joachim Lauer was born in 1950 and studied medicine in Frankfurt (Germany) from 1968 to 1975. He became a resident in the Department of Neurology of Klinikum Darmstadt, the Academic Teaching Hospital of Frankfurt University (Akademisches Lehrkrankenhaus der Universitäten Frankfurt/Main und Heidelberg-Mannheim, a major healthcare institution in South Hesse. Besides clinical work, Lauer devoted most of his research to epidemiology, with a special focus on MS etiology.

== Career ==
Early on, he published a series of five articles on multiple sclerosis in the land of Hesse with Wolfgang Firnhaber, who had already been studying MS epidemiology in Göttingen and Darmstadt, with support from the Hertie Foundation, the German Research Foundation and the Stifterverband für die Deutsche Wissenschaft. His lasting collaboration with Prof. Firnhaber, a longtime expert in MS prognostication and geomedical aspects of MS, provided K. Lauer with a solid background in geomedical investigation.

In the mid 80's, Lauer launched a series of specialized reports in Scandinavia, starting with a study of multiple sclerosis in Western Norway published in Neurology. He has been following Norvegian MS ever since and has also coauthored epidemiological studies in Sweden with Anne-Marie Landtblom and Inger Boström.

Like John Kurtzke, Klaus J. Lauer has dedicated a large part of his work to the study of MS in the Faroe Islands, starting with a 1986 article in the Journal of Neurology entitled "Some comments on the occurrence of multiple sclerosis in the Faroe Islands", followed in 1988 by "Multiple sclerosis in relation to industrial and commercial activities in the Faroe Islands" in the journal Neuroepidemiology, followed one year later by "Dietary changes in temporal relation to multiple sclerosis in the Faroe Islands: an evaluation of literary sources" in the same journal.

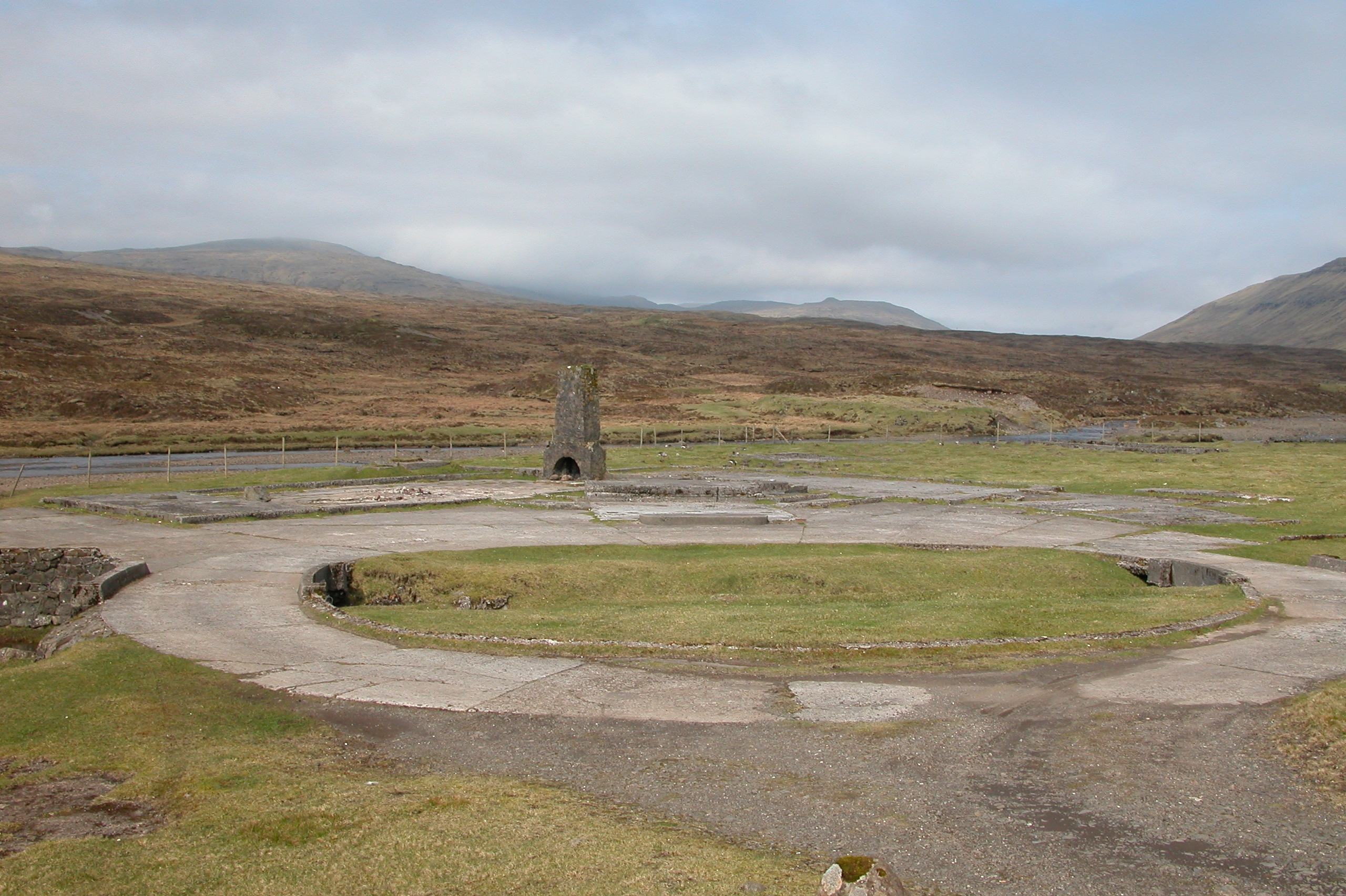
Remains of the WW2 British barracks at Vágar Airport on the Faroe Islands

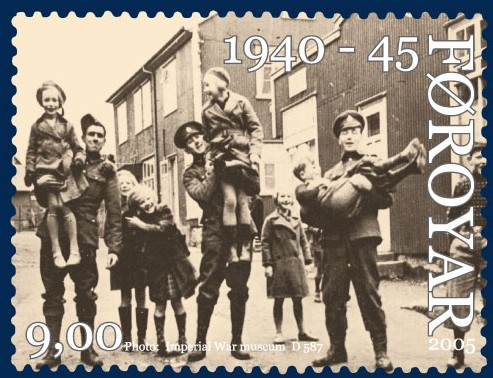
2005 Faroese stamp: British soldiers and children in the Faroe Islands

MS is generally considered a multifactorial disease, in which genetic predispositions and environmental triggers combine to launch an autoimmune process. As an international expert on the environmental dimension of MS, Lauer compiled a review in Expert Review of Neurotherapeutics.

Since 1992, Lauer has published a large number of epidemiological studies covering most west European countries, Russia, the USA, Canada, some countries in Asia and the Middle-East, with a special focus on dietary aspects of etiology. Most recently, Klaus Lauer has focused again on MS in the Faroes and has been involved as an expert in the steering committee of the EnviMS study, a major multi-countries study investigating the impact of environmental exposures on MS. Lauer is also one of the authors of a reference study of the cost of MS in Europe and of several publications dealing with technical and methodological considerations in neuroepidemiology applied to multiple sclerosis.
