= Fatigue =

State of tiredness, exhaustion or loss of energy

- Other names: Exhaustion, weariness, tiredness, lethargy, listlessness
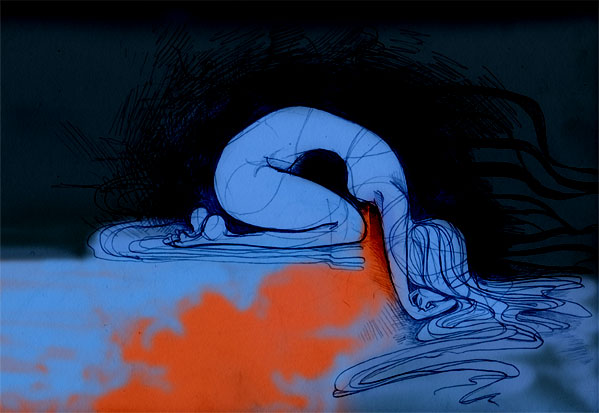
- Artistic representation of ME/CFS
- Specialty: General practice, primary care
- Treatment: Healthy diet, exercise regularly, medication, hydration, and vitamins. Avoid known stressors and unhealthy habits (drug use, excessive alcohol consumption, smoking).

Fatigue is a state of being without energy for a prolonged period of time. The word fatigue is used in two contexts: in the medical sense and in the sense of normal tiredness.

In the medical sense, fatigue is seen as a symptom, and is sometimes associated with medical conditions including autoimmune disease, organ failure, mood disorders, heart disease, infectious diseases, and post-infectious-disease states. However, fatigue is complex and in up to a third of primary care cases no medical or psychiatric diagnosis is found.

In the sense of tiredness, fatigue often follows prolonged physical or mental activity. Physical fatigue results from muscle fatigue brought about by intense physical activity. Mental fatigue results from prolonged periods of cognitive activity which impairs cognitive ability, can manifest as sleepiness, lethargy, or directed attention fatigue, and can also impair physical performance.

== Definition ==
Fatigue in a medical context is used to cover experiences of low energy that are not caused by normal life.

A 2021 review proposed a definition for fatigue as a starting point for discussion: "A multi-dimensional phenomenon in which the biophysiological, cognitive, motivational and emotional state of the body is affected resulting in significant impairment of the individual's ability to function in their normal capacity".

Another definition is that fatigue is "a significant subjective sensation of weariness, increasing sense of effort, mismatch between effort expended and actual performance, or exhaustion independent from medications, chronic pain, physical deconditioning, anaemia, respiratory dysfunction, depression, and sleep disorders".

=== Terminology ===
The use of the term fatigue in medical contexts may carry inaccurate connotations from the more general usage of the same word. More accurate terminology may also be needed for variants within the umbrella term of fatigue.

=== Comparison with other terms ===
==== Tiredness ====
Tiredness which is a normal result of work, mental stress, anxiety, overstimulation and understimulation, jet lag, active recreation, boredom, or lack of sleep is not considered medical fatigue. This is the tiredness described in MeSH Descriptor Data.

==== Exhaustion ====
Exhaustion is a state of extreme tiredness.

==== Sleepiness ====
Sleepiness refers to a tendency to fall asleep, whereas fatigue refers to an overwhelming sense of tiredness, lack of energy, and a feeling of exhaustion. Sleepiness and fatigue often coexist as a consequence of sleep deprivation. However sleepiness and fatigue may not correlate. Fatigue is generally considered a longer-term condition than sleepiness (somnolence).

== Classification ==
"Fatigue" is categorised as ICD-11 code MG22.

== Presentation ==
=== Common features ===
Distinguishing features of medical fatigue include:

- unpredictability,
- variability in severity,
- fatigue being relatively profound/overwhelming, and having extensive impact on daily living,
- lack of improvement with rest,
- where an underlying disease is present, the amount of fatigue is often not commensurate with the severity of the underlying disease.

=== Differentiating features ===
Differentiating characteristics of fatigue that may help identify the possible cause of fatigue include:

- Post-exertional malaise; a common feature of ME/CFS,.
- Increased by heat or cold; MS fatigue is in many cases affected in this way.
- Flare-ups and Remissions; Some fatigue diseases have flareups of a few weeks (lupus, fibromyalgia). Other fatigue diseases may have longer patterns of activity and remission, or no remissions at all (MS).
- Variability within a day; Some fatigues (rheumatoid arthritis (RA), cancer-related fatigue) seem to often be continual (24/7), whilst others (MS, Sjögren's, lupus, brain injury) often vary in intensity at different times within a day. A 2010 study found that Sjögren's patients reported fatigue after rising, an improvement in mid-morning, and worsening later in the day, whereas lupus (SLE) patients reported lower fatigue after rising followed by increasing fatigue through the day. ME/CFS symptoms can be continual, or can fluctuate during the day, from day to day, and over longer periods. Fibromyalgia fatigue can be continual or variable.
- The pace of onset may be a related differentiating factor; MS fatigue can have abrupt onset.
- Feeling of weight; some fatigues, including that caused by MS, create a sense of weight or gravity; "I feel like I have lead weights attached to my limbs ... or I am being pulled down by gravity."

Some people may have multiple causes of fatigue.

== Causes ==
Fatigue is complex and can be driven and maintained by a potentially wide range of biopsychosocial factors. Tiredness is a common medically unexplained symptom. In up to a third of fatigue primary care cases, no medical or psychiatric diagnosis is found.

=== Adverse life events ===
Adverse life events have been associated with fatigue.

=== Drug use ===
A 2021 study in a Korean city found that alcohol consumption was the variable with the most correlation with overall fatigue. A 2020 Norway study found that 69% of substance use disorder patients had severe fatigue symptoms, and particularly those with extensive use of benzodiazepines. Causality, as opposed to correlation, were not proven in these studies.

=== Digital screen use ===
The protracted use of digital screens—such as those associated with computers, laptops and smartphones—can cause eye fatigue, and induce a general state of mental and physical exhaustion. Specific symptoms may include sore eyes, blurred vision, headaches and associated orthopedic issues such as a sore neck and back. These symptoms collectively are known as computer vision syndrome (CVS) or in colloquial parlance as screen fatigue.

=== Sleep disturbance ===
Fatigue can often be traced to poor sleep habits. Sleep deprivation and disruption is associated with subsequent fatigue. Sleep disturbances due to disease may impact fatigue. Caffeine and alcohol can disrupt sleep, causing fatigue.

=== Medications ===
Fatigue may be a side effect of certain medications (e.g., lithium salts, ciprofloxacin); beta blockers, which can induce exercise intolerance, medicines used to treat allergies or coughs, and many cancer treatments, particularly chemotherapy and radiotherapy. Use of benzodiazepines has been found to correlate with higher fatigue.

=== Association with diseases and illnesses ===
Fatigue is often associated with diseases and conditions. Some major categories of conditions that often list fatigue as a symptom include physical diseases, substance use illness, mental illnesses, and other diseases and conditions.

==== Physical diseases ====
- autoimmune diseases, such as celiac disease, lupus, multiple sclerosis, myasthenia gravis, NMOSD, Sjögren's syndrome, rheumatoid arthritis, spondyloarthropathy and UCTD; this population's primary concern is fatigue;
- blood disorders, such as anemia and hemochromatosis;
- brain injury;
- cancer, in which case it is called cancer fatigue;
- COVID-19 and long COVID;
- endocrine diseases or metabolic disorders: diabetes mellitus, hypothyroidism and Addison's disease;
- fibromyalgia;
- heart failure and heart attack;
- HIV;
- inborn errors of metabolism such as fructose malabsorption;
- infectious diseases such as infectious mononucleosis or tuberculosis;
- irritable bowel syndrome;
- kidney diseases, e.g., acute renal failure, chronic renal failure;
- leukemia or lymphoma;
- liver failure or liver diseases, e.g., hepatitis;
- low blood pressure;
- Lyme disease;
- mast cell activation syndrome;
- neurological disorders such as narcolepsy, Parkinson's disease, postural orthostatic tachycardia syndrome (POTS) and post-concussion syndrome;
- nutritional deficiencies, such as sodium, iron, vitamin B_{12}, and folate deficiencies;
- physical trauma and other pain-causing conditions, such as arthritis;
- sarcoidosis;
- sleep deprivation or sleep disorders, e.g. sleep apnea;
- stroke;
- thyroid disease such as hypothyroidism;

==== Mental disorders ====
- anxiety disorders, such as generalized anxiety disorder;
- developmental disorders such as autism spectrum disorder;
- depression;
- eating disorders, which can produce fatigue due to inadequate nutrition;

==== Other ====
- myalgic encephalomyelitis/chronic fatigue syndrome (ME/CFS);
- idiopathic chronic fatigue, a term used to describe chronic fatigue which does not have symptoms of ME/CFS. However ICF does not have a dedicated diagnostic code in the World Health Organization's ICD-11 classification;
- Gulf War syndrome.

==== Primary vs. secondary ====
In some areas, it has been proposed that fatigue be separated into

- primary fatigue, caused directly by a disease process, and
- ordinary or secondary fatigue, caused by a range of causes including exertion and also secondary impacts on a person of having a disease (such as disrupted sleep).

The ICD-11 MG22 definition of fatigue captures both types of fatigue; it includes fatigue that "occur[s] in the absence of... exertion... as a symptom of health conditions."

=== Obesity ===
Obesity correlates with higher fatigue levels and incidence.

=== Somatic symptom disorder ===
In somatic symptom disorder the patient is overfocused on a physical symptom, such as fatigue, that may or may not be explained by a medical condition.

=== Scientifically unsupported causes ===
The concept of adrenal fatigue is often raised in media but no scientific basis has been found for it.

== Mechanisms ==
The mechanisms that cause fatigue are not well understood. Several mechanisms may be in operation within a patient, with the relative contribution of each mechanism differing over time.

Proposed fatigue explanations due to permanent changes in the brain may have difficulty in explaining the "unpredictability" and "variability" (i.e. appearing intermittently during the day, and not on all days) of the fatigue associated with inflammatory rheumatic diseases and autoimmune diseases (such as multiple sclerosis).

=== Inflammation ===
Inflammation distorts neural chemistry, brain function and functional connectivity across a broad range of brain networks, and has been linked to many types of fatigue. Findings implicate neuroinflammation in the etiology of fatigue in autoimmune and related disorders. Low-grade inflammation may cause an imbalance between energy availability and expenditure.

Cytokines are small protein molecules that modulate immune responses and inflammation (as well as other functions) and may have causal roles in fatigue. However a 2019 review was inconclusive as to whether cytokines play any definitive role in ME/CFS.

=== Reduced brain connectivity ===
Fatigue has been correlated with reductions in structural and functional connectivity in the brain, including in post-stroke, MS, NMOSD and MOG, and ME/CFS. This was also found for fatigue after brain injury, including a significant linear correlation between self-reported fatigue and brain functional connectivity.

Areas of the brain for which there is evidence of relation to fatigue are the thalamus and middle frontal cortex, fronto-parietal and cingulo-opercular, and default mode network, salience network, and thalamocortical loop areas.

A 2024 review found that structural connectivity changes may underlie fatigue in pwRRMS but that the overall results were inconclusive, possibly explained by heterogeneity and a limited number of studies.

A small 2023 study found that infratentorial lesion volume (cerebellar and brainstem) was a relatively good predictor of RRMS fatigue severity.

=== Damage to brain white matter ===
Studies have found MS fatigue correlates with damage to NAWM (normal appearing white matter) (which will not show on normal MRI but will show on DTI (diffusion tensor imaging)). The correlation becomes unreliable in patients aged over 65 due to age-related damage.

=== Heat shock proteins ===
A small 2016 study found that primary Sjögren's syndrome patients with high fatigue, when compared with those with low fatigue, had significantly higher plasma concentrations of HSP90α, and a tendency to higher concentrations of HSP72. A small 2020 study of Crohn's disease patients found that higher fatigue visual analogue scale (fVAS) scores correlated with higher HSP90α levels. A related small 2012 trial investigating if application of an IL-1 receptor antagonist (anakinra) would reduce fatigue in primary Sjögren's syndrome patients was inconclusive.

== Measurement ==
Fatigue is currently measured by many different self-measurement surveys. Examples are the Fatigue Symptom Inventory (FSI) and the Fatigue Severity Scale. There is no consensus on best practice, and the existing surveys do not capture the intermittent nature of some forms of fatigue. Heart rate variability cannot currently distinguish between physical fatigue and mental fatigue. Many studies have shown that salivary cortisol can measure mental fatigue.

== Diagnosis ==
=== Diagnosis guidance ===
A 2023 guidance indicates the following

- in the primary care setting, a medical or psychiatric diagnosis is found in at least two-thirds of patients;
- the most common diagnoses are viral illness, upper respiratory infection, iron-deficiency anaemia, acute bronchitis, adverse effects of a medical agent in the proper dose, and depression or other mental disorder, such as panic disorder, and somatisation disorder;
- the origin of fatigue may be central, brain-derived, or peripheral, usually of a neuromuscular origin—it may be attributed to physical illness, psychological (e.g., psychiatric disorder), social (e.g., family problems), and physiological factors (e.g., old age), and occupational illness (e.g., workplace stress);
- when unexplained, clinically evaluated chronic fatigue can be separated into ME/CFS and idiopathic chronic fatigue.

A 2016 German review found that

- about 20% of people complaining of tiredness to a GP (general practitioner) suffered from a depressive disorder.
- anaemia, malignancies and other serious somatic diseases were only rarely found in fatigued primary care patients, with prevalence rates hardly differing from non-fatigued patients.
- if fatigue occurred in primary care patients as an isolated symptom without additional abnormalities in the medical history and in the clinical examination, then extensive diagnostic testing rarely helped detect serious diseases. Such testing might also lead to false-positive tests.

A 2014 Australian review recommended that a period of watchful waiting may be appropriate if there are no major warning signs.

A 2009 study found that about 50% of people who had fatigue received a diagnosis that could explain the fatigue after a year with the condition. In those people who had a possible diagnosis, musculoskeletal (19.4%) and psychological problems (16.5%) were the most common. Definitive physical conditions were only found in 8.2% of cases.

=== Classification ===
==== By type ====
===== Uni- or multi-dimensional =====
Fatigue can be seen as a uni-dimensional phenomenon that influences different aspects of human life. It can be multi-faceted and broadly defined, making understanding the causes of its manifestations especially difficult in conditions with diverse pathology including autoimmune diseases.

A 2021 review considered that different "types/subsets" of fatigue may exist and that patients normally present with more than one such "type/subset". These different "types/subsets" of fatigue may be different dimensions of the same symptom, and the relative manifestations of each may depend on the relative contribution of different mechanisms. Inflammation may be the root causal mechanism in many cases.

===== Physical =====
Physical fatigue, or muscle fatigue, is the temporary physical inability of muscles to perform optimally. The onset of muscle fatigue during physical activity is gradual, and depends upon an individual's level of physical fitness – other factors include sleep deprivation and overall health. Physical fatigue can be caused by a lack of energy in the muscle, by a decrease of the efficiency of the neuromuscular junction or by a reduction of the drive originating from the central nervous system, and can be reversed by rest. The central component of fatigue is triggered by an increase of the level of serotonin in the central nervous system. During motor activity, serotonin released in synapses that contact motor neurons promotes muscle contraction. During high level of motor activity, the amount of serotonin released increases and a spillover occurs. Serotonin binds to extrasynaptic receptors located on the axonal initial segment of motor neurons with the result that nerve impulse initiation and thereby muscle contraction are inhibited.

Muscle strength testing can be used to determine the presence of a neuromuscular disease, but cannot determine its cause. Additional testing, such as electromyography, can provide diagnostic information, but information gained from muscle strength testing alone is not enough to diagnose most neuromuscular disorders.

===== Mental =====
Mental fatigue is a temporary inability to maintain optimal cognitive performance. The onset of mental fatigue during any cognitive activity is gradual, and depends upon an individual's cognitive ability, and also upon other factors, such as sleep deprivation and overall health.

Mental fatigue has also been shown to decrease physical performance. It can manifest as somnolence, lethargy, directed attention fatigue, or disengagement. Research also suggests that mental fatigue is closely linked to the concept of ego depletion, though the validity of the concept is disputed. For example, one pre-registered study of 686 participants found that after exerting mental effort, people are likely to disengage and become less interested in exerting further effort.

Decreased attention can also be described as a more or less decreased level of consciousness. In any case, this can be dangerous when performing tasks that require constant concentration, such as operating large vehicles. For instance, a person who is sufficiently somnolent may experience microsleep. However, objective cognitive testing can be used to differentiate the neurocognitive deficits of brain disease from those attributable to tiredness.

The perception of mental fatigue is believed to be modulated by the brain's reticular activating system (RAS).

Fatigue impacts a driver's reaction time, awareness of hazards around them and their attention. Drowsy drivers are three times more likely to be involved in a car crash, and being awake over 20 hours is the equivalent of driving with a blood-alcohol concentration level of 0.08%.

Mental fatigue has also been defined from the cost-benefit model, drawing on influential insights from the current neuroscience literature on how fatigue alters motivation to perform. The model specifies how the reward value, effort costs, and fatigue aspects of task performance converge in the medial prefrontal cortex to calculate the net motivational value of stimuli and to select appropriate actions.

===== Neurological fatigue =====
People with multiple sclerosis experience a form of overwhelming tiredness that can occur at any time of the day, for any duration, and that does not necessarily recur in a recognizable pattern for any given patient, referred to as "neurological fatigue", and often as "multiple sclerosis fatigue" or "lassitude". People with autoimmune diseases including inflammatory rheumatic diseases such as rheumatoid arthritis, psoriatic arthritis and primary Sjögren's syndrome, experience similar fatigue. Attempts have been made to isolate causes of central nervous system fatigue.

==== By timescale ====
Acute
Acute fatigue is that which is temporary and self-limited. Acute fatigue is most often caused by an infection such as the common cold and can be cognized as one part of the sickness behavior response occurring when the immune system fights an infection. Other common causes of acute fatigue include depression and chemical causes, such as dehydration, poisoning, low blood sugar, or mineral or vitamin deficiencies.
Prolonged
Prolonged fatigue is a self-reported, persistent (constant) fatigue lasting at least one month.
Chronic
Chronic fatigue is a self-reported fatigue lasting at least 6 consecutive months. Chronic fatigue may be either persistent or relapsing. Chronic fatigue is a symptom of many chronic illnesses and of idiopathic chronic fatigue.

==== By effect ====
Fatigue can have significant negative impacts on quality of life. Profound and debilitating fatigue is the most common complaint reported among individuals with autoimmune disease, such as systemic lupus erythematosus, multiple sclerosis, type 1 diabetes, celiac disease, Myalgic Encephalomyelitis/chronic fatigue syndrome, and rheumatoid arthritis. Fatigue has been described by sufferers as 'incomprehensible' due to its unpredictable occurrence, lack of relationship to physical effort and different character as compared to tiredness.

==== WHO classification ====
The World Health Organization's ICD-11 classification includes a category MG22 Fatigue (typically fatigue following exertion but sometimes may occur in the absence of such exertion as a symptom of health conditions), and many other categories where fatigue is mentioned as a secondary result of other factors. It does not include any fatigue-based psychiatric illness (unless it is accompanied by related psychiatric symptoms).

DSM-5 lists 'fatigue or loss of energy nearly every day' as one factor in diagnosing depression.

== Treatment and management ==
Management may include review of factors and methods as explained below.

=== Cessation of medications causing fatigue ===
Taking of medications with side effects of contributing to fatigue may be ceased.

=== Medications to treat fatigue ===
The UK NICE recommends consideration of amantadine, modafinil, and selective serotonin reuptake inhibitors (SSRIs) for MS fatigue. A PCORI review, however, found amantadine, methylphenidate, and modafinil no more effective than placebo in reducing fatigue, with side effects reported. Psychostimulants such as methylphenidate, amphetamines, and modafinil have been used in the treatment of fatigue related to depression, medical illness such as chronic fatigue syndrome, and cancer. They have also been used to counteract fatigue in sleep loss and in aviation.

=== Mental health tools ===
CBT can be useful for fatigue, including ME/CFS but is not included in NICE guidelines for ME/CFS treatment.

=== Other approaches ===
==== Avoidance of body heat ====
Fatigue in MS often correlates with relatively high endogenous body temperature.

==== Improved sleep ====
Improving sleep has been associated with reduced fatigue but only in small studies.

==== Intermittent fasting ====
A small 2022 study found 40% reductions in fatigue categorisations after three months of 16:8 intermittent fasting.

==== Vagus nerve stimulation ====
A small 2023 study of Sjogren's patients showed reductions in self-reported fatigue after 56 days of vagus nerve stimulation.

==== Qigong and Tai Chi ====
Qigong and Tai chi have been postulated as helpful to reduce fatigue, but the evidence is of low quality.

=== Approaches to managing fatigue ===
Some health systems help people manage their fatigue better through attitude changes and skills transference.

== Prevalence ==
2023 guidance stated fatigue prevalence is between 4.3% and 21.9%. Prevalence is higher in women than men.

A 2021 German study found that fatigue was the main or secondary reason for 10–20% of all consultations with a primary care physician.

A large study based on the 2004 Health and Retirement Study (HRS), a biennial longitudinal survey of US adults aged 51 and above, with mean age 65, found that 33% of women and 29% of men self-reported fatigue.

Fatigue represents a large health economic burden and unmet need to patients and to society.

== Possible purposes of fatigue ==
=== Body resource management purposes ===
Fatigue has been posited as a bio-psycho-physiological state reflecting the body's overall strategy in resource (energy) management. Fatigue may occur when the body wants to limit resource utilisation ("rationing") in order to use resources for healing (part of sickness behaviour) or conserve energy for a particular current or future anticipated need, including a threat.

=== Evolutionary purposes ===
It has been posited that fatigue had evolutionary benefits in making more of the body's resources available for healing processes, such as immune responses, and in limiting disease spread by tending to reduce social interactions.

== See also ==
- Acquiescence
- Affect
- Cancer-related fatigue
- Central governor
- Chronic stress
- Clouding of consciousness
- Combat stress reaction
- Directed attention fatigue
- Disorders of diminished motivation
- Effects of fatigue on safety
- Feeling
- Gaucher's disease
- Heat illness
- Malaise
- Microsleep
- Museum fatigue
- Presenteeism
- Sleep-deprived driving
- Pacing (activity management)
- Zoom fatigue
