= Cancer-related fatigue =

Fatigue experienced with cancer patients

Cancer-related fatigue is a symptom of fatigue that is experienced by nearly all cancer patients.

Among patients receiving cancer treatment other than surgery, it is essentially universal. Fatigue is a normal and expected side effect of most forms of chemotherapy, radiation therapy, and biotherapy. On average, cancer-related fatigue is "more severe, more distressing, and less likely to be relieved by rest" than fatigue experienced by healthy people. It can range from mild to severe, and may be either temporary or a long-term effect.

Fatigue may be a symptom of the cancer, or it may be the result of treatments for the cancer.

== Pathophysiology ==
The pathophysiology of cancer-related fatigue is poorly understood. It may be caused by the cancer or the effects it has on the body, by the body's response to the cancer, or by the cancer treatments.

Fatigue is a common symptom of cancer. One meta-analysis estimated that around 43% of individuals with cancer report experiencing fatigue. The study also highlighted that fatigue levels can differ depending on factors like the type of cancer, the stage of treatment, and gender. Notably, women were found to experience more severe fatigue than men.

Some fatigue is caused by cancer treatments. This may show a characteristic pattern. Chemotherapy is a form of cancer treatment that can result in cancer-related fatigue, either as a direct consequence or as a secondary effect. Disturbed sleep during chemotherapy has also been associated with CRF in breast cancer survivors. Chemotherapy can damage the sarcoplasmic reticulum and/or mitochondria, potentially leading to a disrupted energy metabolism and an increased risk of peripheral fatigue. For example, people on many chemotherapy regimens often feel more fatigue in the week after treatments, and less fatigue as they recover from that round of medications. People receiving radiation therapy, by contrast, often find their fatigue steadily increases until the end of treatment.

Radiotherapy can result in CRF. For example, studies have shown that radiotherapy increased cancer related fatigue in some cancers. Fatigue is a prevalent side effect of radiation therapy and can significantly limit patients' daily activities. Typically, fatigue intensifies during the initial stages of treatment, reaches a plateau around the midpoint, and remains relatively stable until therapy concludes. Although many patients experience gradual improvement after treatment ends, others report fatigue that persists for months or even years. In some cases, energy levels may not fully return to pre-treatment baselines.

Treatment for cancer such as surgery can result in CRF, either directly or as a secondary effect. However, when surgery is combined with other cancer therapies such as chemotherapy or radiation fatigue can be more pronounced and prolonged.

A systematic review and meta-analysis found that approximately 42% of working cancer survivors report experiencing cancer-related fatigue. The analysis also identified emotional distress as a possible contributing factor to ongoing fatigue symptoms. These findings suggest that both physical and psychological factors may influence fatigue in working survivors, indicating the potential value of supportive workplace strategies

Proposed mechanisms by which cancer can cause fatigue include an increase in pro-inflammatory cytokines, dysregulation of the hypothalamic-pituitary-adrenal axis, disruption of circadian rhythms, muscle loss and cancer wasting, and genetic problems. Additionally, some forms of cancer may cause fatigue through more direct mechanisms, such as a leukemia that causes anemia by preventing the bone marrow from producing blood cells efficiently. A relationship between Interleukin 6 and fatigue has been observed in studies, albeit inconsistently. Increased markers of sympathetic nervous system activity are also associated with cancer related fatigue.

== Screening ==
The National Comprehensive Cancer Network recommends that every cancer patient be systematically screened for fatigue at the first visit with an oncologist, throughout treatment, and afterwards. Screening typically involves a simple question, like "On a scale of one to ten, how tired have you felt during the last week?"

More detailed information may be collected in a symptom journal.

== Diagnosis ==
Some causes of cancer-related fatigue are treatable, and evaluation is directed towards identifying these treatable causes. Treatable causes of cancer-related fatigue include: anemia, pain, emotional distress, sleep disturbances, nutritional disturbances, decreased physical fitness and activity, side effects from medications (e.g., sedatives), abuse of alcohol or other substances. Additionally, other medical conditions, such as infections, heart disease, or endocrine dysfunction (e.g., hot flashes), can cause fatigue, and may also need treatment.

=== Definition ===
The National Comprehensive Cancer Network defines cancer-related fatigue as "a distressing persistent, subjective sense of physical, emotional and/or cognitive tiredness or exhaustion related to cancer or cancer treatment that is not proportional to recent activity and interferes with usual functioning".

Cancer-related fatigue is a chronic fatigue (persistent fatigue not relieved by rest), but it is not related to chronic fatigue syndrome. Cancer-related fatigue occurs in a significant proportion of cancer survivors, both during and after cancer treatment. A review of current evidence indicates that exercise is the most effective way of ameliorating cancer-related fatigue.

=== Prostate cancer ===
Cancer related fatigue is common in patients undergoing treatment for prostate cancer. A systematic review of the prevalence of cancer-related fatigue in men with prostate cancer was performed. The analysis indicated that fatigue is a common symptom, occurring in about 40% of men with prostate cancer especially among those using hormone therapy.

=== Breast cancer ===
Cancer-related fatigue is a prevalent and significant symptom among breast cancer patients, often lasting for years after treatment. An empirical study regarding cancer-related fatigue in breast cancer patients identified different groups of patients based on their fatigue levels, with nearly half (47.5%) falling into an "exhausted" group, characterized by high fatigue severity and interference in daily activities, along with elevated stress, anxiety, depression, and sleep disturbance, significantly impacting quality of life.

== Management ==
Treatment depends on the patient's overall situation. A patient who is in active treatment may have different priorities than a person who has completed treatment, or who is at the end of life.

Some management strategies may help all patients and could be supported by the work of an Occupational Therapist. These include scheduling high-priority tasks during the patient's best time of day, using labor-saving devices, delegating tasks to caregivers, and avoiding unimportant activities, so that the patient will have more energy available for other activities.

Patients who are not at the end of life may benefit from physical exercise or physical therapy. Engaging in physical activity may reduce fatigue. Forms of exercise that have been proven to be most effective are more aerobic exercise such as walking, running, cycling, and swimming. These forms of activity can be done at various levels of intensity and have been proven as an effective way of improving quality of life for cancer patients. A network meta-analysis evaluated the effectiveness of various exercise modalities in alleviating CRF among breast cancer patients. The findings indicated that yoga was the most effective, followed by combined aerobic and resistance exercises. In addition to general exercise and yoga, other mind-body practices such as Qigong have demonstrated potential benefits in managing CRF.

=== Exercise ===
Cancer-related fatigue is known to interfere with body functions and daily activities. Exercise is thought to improve overall physical functioning by increasing daytime activities, which directly improves cancer-related fatigue. Regular physical exercise offers long-term benefits in reducing the intensity of cancer pain and its disruption of daily life, thereby helping to ease cancer related fatigue. Exercise interventions have shown to significantly improved quality of life and significantly decreased cancer-related fatigue among cancer patients . Aerobic exercise provided considerable improvements in both cancer-related fatigue and quality of life. An intervention less than 12 weeks showed a better effect on both cancer-related fatigue and quality of life and was suggested as most effective. Exercising three times per week was the most effective frequency for improving QoL . Exercise intervention was more successful in improving both CRF and QoL in female cancer patients.

Cancer-related fatigue is often linked to immune dysregulation and inflammatory problems. Exercise interventions can help cancer patients by strengthening the immune system, regulating body balance, and controlling inflammation, which in turn helps to alleviate fatigue . A sedentary lifestyle following a cancer diagnosis can negatively impact QoL and, implicitly, fatigue. Exercise promotes a cost-effective healthy life.

=== Relaxation ===
During treatment, relaxation is the best choice and should be considered alongside personalized exercise. After treatment, time invested in relaxation sessions is less effective, and health professionals should recommend more physical activity-enhancing interventions. Yoga, aerobic training, resistance training, and combined aerobic-resistance training were beneficial both during and after cancer treatment, though on a lower effect size level than relaxation (during) or yoga (after)

Relaxation specifically had the highest effect size during active cancer treatment. During chemotherapy or radiotherapy, patients often experience high acute stress and physical burden, making stress-reducing interventions like relaxation highly effective. Relaxation may be most critical when patients are acutely struggling with therapy side effects and stress. After treatment, time spent relaxing is less effective, and patients benefit more from physical activity enhancing interventions. Yoga is beneficial in both phases. Its combined effect of physical activity (improving fitness) and mind-body techniques (stress reduction) makes it highly effective.

=== Role of Social Support ===
Presence of social support for patients is significantly associated with decreased cancer-related fatigue. Often, first-degree relatives such as the parent, sibling, or child of the patient provides social support. Cognitive training coupled with social support has been found to significantly decrease levels of short-term and long-term fatigue.

=== Yoga ===
With its focus on the integration of inner awareness, breathing, and body, yoga differs from general aerobic exercise. Hatha yoga, a commonly practiced and accessible form of yoga, integrates physical postures (asanas) and breathwork (pranayama) and was featured in several interventions evaluated for their effectiveness in reducing cancer-related fatigue. Mixed types of yoga—those combining physical postures, breathing control, and mindfulness—were associated with increased patient adherence and improved fatigue outcomes. Physical postures, often involving gentle stretching and movement, contributed to improved physical function, especially when paired with breathwork or meditative elements. Breathing techniques alone, such as pranayama-based interventions, also demonstrated positive effects on fatigue management by potentially modulating stress and supporting emotional well-being. These interventions were most effective when delivered as part of a strategy that included both supervised group sessions and ongoing self-practice. As a low-intensity form of exercise, yoga practice of 150 minutes or greater per week is considered safe and effective for alleviating cancer-related fatigue.

=== Qigong ===
Qigong is a traditional Chinese practice that combines gentle movements, breathing exercises, and meditation to cultivate and maintain health and well-being. Research has consistently found that Qigong practice relieved cancer-related fatigue. A systematic review and meta-analysis of randomized controlled trials found that Qigong practice is comparable to the effects of other intervention therapies for cancer-related fatigue, including Western exercise. Mindful Exercises like Qigong may offer an alternative strategy for individuals who find it difficult to adhere to or adapt to medium or high-intensity aerobic exercise. Larger reductions in fatigue were observed among patients with higher baseline fatigue scores following Qigong intervention. Different styles of Qigong, such as Taiichi Qigong, Badu Anjin Qigong, and Guolin Qigong, have been used in studies examining their effects on cancer-related fatigue.

=== Other Mindfulness-based Interventions ===
In addition to yoga and Qigong, other mindfulness-based interventions (MBIs) have been studied for their potential in managing cancer-related fatigue. These interventions typically aim to help individuals become more aware of present-moment experiences, including physical sensations and thought processes, while adopting a nonjudgmental and accepting attitude.

One of the most frequently studied MBIs is Mindfulness-Based Stress Reduction (MBSR), a structured program that uses practices such as body scanning, mindful breathing, and gentle movement to help individuals recognize and accept discomfort without judgment or avoidance. MBSR has been shown in multiple studies to reduce symptoms of fatigue and emotional distress in oncology populations.

Mindfulness-Based Cognitive Therapy (MBCT) builds upon the MBSR model by incorporating elements of cognitive therapy, particularly techniques aimed at helping individuals identify and disengage from repetitive or negative thought patterns. MBCT interventions have been used to support patients in reducing cognitive reactivity, which may contribute to the emotional and psychological aspects of fatigue.

Mindfulness-Based Cancer Recovery (MBCR) is an adaptation of MBSR specifically tailored for individuals with cancer. It focuses on addressing the unique psychological and physical challenges faced by cancer patients through mindfulness training. While fewer studies have evaluated MBCR compared to MBSR or MBCT, preliminary evidence suggests potential benefits in improving fatigue-related outcomes.

Recent research has explored several complementary approaches for managing cancer-related fatigue (CRF), including microbiome-based therapies, nurse-led interventions, and melatonin supplementation. A systematic review examining the use of probiotics and synbiotics found preliminary evidence suggesting they may help reduce CRF symptoms, though the authors emphasized the need for more extensive clinical trials to confirm their effectiveness. Another systematic review focusing on nurse-led interventions showed that multidisciplinary strategies—particularly those involving physical activity and psychological support—can be beneficial in easing fatigue among cancer patients. Additionally, a meta-analysis on melatonin supplementation reported that taking melatonin, especially for periods of 13 weeks or longer, may lead to noticeable improvements in fatigue severity.

While antidepressants are ineffective at reducing fatigue in non-depressed cancer patients, psychostimulants such as methylphenidate and amphetamines may reduce fatigue in some patients. Methylphenidate may be effective in the management of cancer-related fatigue. If methylphenidate were to be used in patients with CRF, it would be prudent to restrict its use to patients with advanced disease or for short-term use in patients on active treatment. The clear advantage of methylphenidate in cancer is its rapid onset of action within 24–48 hours, and so the drug can be discontinued if ineffective.

At the end of life, fatigue is usually associated with other symptoms, especially anemia, side effects from many medications and previous treatments, and poor nutritional status. Pain, difficulty breathing, and fatigue form a common symptom cluster. Fatigue often increases as patients with advanced cancer approach death. As a result, people who are dying often sleep much more than a healthy person.

=== Addressing specific causes ===
If the fatigue is caused or exacerbated by a specific medical condition, such as anemia, then treatment of that medical condition should reduce the fatigue.

- Anemia: Loss of oxygen-carrying red blood cells is a common cause of fatigue. Medications to improve blood production or blood transfusions frequently reduce fatigue.
- Pain: A variety of approaches to managing cancer pain may be used, particularly analgesic medications.
- Emotional distress: Anxiety and depression are strongly associated with fatigue in cancer patients. Psychosocial treatments directed at reducing stress and increasing coping skills may reduce fatigue. Additionally, some patients in active treatment worry that the fatigue indicates treatment failure, and this anxiety may increase their fatigue in a vicious cycle. Education about fatigue as a normal side effect can reassure the patient. Up to 25% of cancer patients will experience depression.
- Sleep disturbances: Patients who do not sleep well are more tired than others. Cancer patients commonly experience insomnia or hypersomnia. Sleep disturbances may be caused by sleeping too much during the day, by restless leg syndrome, by pain, by anxiety, or by other medical conditions, like obstructive sleep apnea or menopause. Practicing good sleep hygiene may reduce fatigue by improving sleep quality.
- Nutritional disturbances: Patients may have difficulty eating, may not be absorbing food well, or may have chosen an extreme diet as an alternative cancer treatment. Loss of appetite, diarrhea and vomiting may result in the patient consuming too few calories or becoming dehydrated.
- Lack of physical activity: Decreased physical activity can make fatigue worse by reducing endurance and muscle strength. Participating in regular aerobic and muscle-strengthening physical activity both during and after cancer treatment may reduce cancer-related fatigue. Current physical activity guidelines recommend adults with cancer to engage in at least 150 minutes per week of moderate- intensity or 75 minutes per week of vigorous-intensity aerobic physical activity, or an equivalent combination. It is also recommended to perform muscle-strengthening physical activity two to three times a week, although there are studies showing that aerobic training is better at mitigating symptoms of cancer-related fatigue and reduces the risk of post exercise malaise. Physical activities should be tailored to individual needs and physical abilities.
- Side effects from medications: Fatigue and sleepiness are known side effects with some kinds of medications. Sometimes a change of medication, the dose, or the timing of the medication may result in less fatigue. For example, an antihistamine might be taken shortly before sleep, rather than in the middle of the day.
- Substance abuse: Alcohol, marijuana, and many other drugs can produce fatigue as a side effect.
- Other medical conditions: Cancer and its treatment usually put intense physical stress on the body, which can exacerbate other medical conditions. Additionally, fatigue may result from an infection.

== Prognosis ==
Fatigue caused by the cancer or its treatment often resolves if treatment is successful. However, some patients experience long-term or chronic fatigue. When strict definitions are used, about 20% of long-term, disease-free cancer survivors report fatigue. Under looser definitions, up to half of cancer survivors report fatigue. However, these studies are largely limited to patients with breast cancer, or peripheral stem cell transplant or bone marrow transplant patients, and the incidence may be different for survivors of other cancers.

Experiencing fatigue before treatment, being depressed or anxious, getting too little exercise, and having other medical conditions are all associated with higher levels of fatigue in post-treatment cancer survivors. Receiving multiple types of treatments, such as chemotherapy and radiation, is associated with more fatigue. Older adults have a higher risk of long-term fatigue.

== Sociodemographic Determinants of Cancer-Related Fatigue ==
There are several sociodemographic characteristics that may increase the risk of experiencing cancer-related fatigue (CRF). Such characteristics include demographic characteristics, socioeconomic status, and marital factors. CRF is also measured as part of Health Related Quality of Life (HRQOL), which has been found to be associated with country of origin, ethnicity, type of insurance, and employment. More research is needed to solidify the understanding of these characteristics' association with CRF. Current findings can help clinical workers, patients, and caregivers anticipate these factors and manage CRF adequately.

Female patients experience more cancer-related fatigue compared to male patients, identifying the female sex as a risk factor for CRF. A possible reason is that breast cancer patients, who are mostly female, experience higher fatigue, whereas prostate cancer patients, who are mainly male, experience less fatigue. Additionally, meta-analyses include studies that have skewed samples that overrepresent females. Females may experience more CRF since they are more susceptible to fatigue-related illnesses and psychological adversities.

Age as a risk factor has yielded differing results. Some studies indicate younger age is associated with cancer-related fatigue, but some found no association. The inconsistent findings such as older age being associated with higher fatigue levels or younger age having a significant association, may be caused by the variety in populations sampled in the research. A possible explanation for higher prevalence of cancer-related fatigue in older population may be the co-morbidities that arise with older age, and an increased physical vulnerability to cancer and cancer treatments.

Ethnicity may be associated with the risk and prevalence of CRF, as studies from Asian countries show a higher prevalence of moderate to severe levels of CRF compared to South American studies. Race and ethnicity as a factor for presence of CRF calls for more research, as studies about breast cancer survivors have found that there is no statistical difference in fatigue levels between Caucasian and non-Caucasians.

Education level and CRF have had inconsistent findings and likely demands more research. Some research has found no association between the level of education and degree of CRF. However, other reviews and studies have found significant associations between education level and CRF, where those with advanced degrees experienced lower levels of fatigue compared to those with some college or high school education.

Socioeconomic indicators have been found to have an association with levels of CRF. The patient's status of medical insurance is found to have an impact on presence and level of CRF. Cancer patients with no insurance are significantly more likely to have increased levels of CRF. Furthermore, low income has been found to have a significant association with higher levels of fatigue. In a study of 200 colorectal patients, lower income had a significant association with cognitive fatigue.

Unmarried/married status is a consistent factor that has a significant association with levels of CRF. Overall, those who do not have a partner, have a higher risk of experiencing more CRF.

== Cancer-related fatigue after treatment for childhood cancer ==
Cancer-related fatigue has consistently been found to be one of the most prevalent and distressing symptoms in childhood cancer survivors. The International Late Effects of Childhood Cancer Guidelines Harmonization Group (IGHG) has published recommendations regarding the surveillance of fatigue in survivors of childhood cancer. These recommendations include regular screenings of fatigue in survivors of childhood cancer. Survivors of pediatric brain tumors report more fatigue after end of treatment than survivors of acute lymphoblastic leukemia, but both groups experience more fatigue than healthy children and adolescents. While considered a long-term effect of the treatment, children and adolescents experience fatigue already during the treatment for acute lymphoblastic leukemia and this side-effect of treatment remains in some patients after the treatment has ended. Fatigue after treatment for pediatric brain tumors does not automatically resolve itself, but requires surveillance and interventions. The location of the tumor is not related to the development of fatigue after a pediatric brain tumor.

== Cancer-related fatigue in older adults ==
Cancer-related fatigue in older adults is the most distressing symptom of cancer, as described by those still undergoing treatment and survivors alike. This is especially distressing for older adults, as 60% of cancer diagnoses are in people 65 and up. An issue with identifying the cause of cancer-related fatigue is the potential of comorbidities. Beyond cancer and treatment related fatigue, older adults may suffer from frailty syndrome or various age-related issues. Moreover, there is a rise in fatigue reported in older adults when compared to studies of the past. Some existing methods of treating fatigue in older adults include exercise, education, and prescribing antidepressants. Depression is especially prevalent in older adults with cancer. The existence of depressive symptoms in an already at risk group further exacerbates the decreased quality of life in this group. Due to the other comorbidities existing in this group, depression is often overlooked, which contributes to why older adults with cancer are one of the most at-risk groups for committing suicide. Fatigue in older adults with cancer is a long lasting and dangerous symptom that requires surveillance and informed aid.
