= Expanded Disability Status Scale =

Multiple sclerosis measure of severity

- Purpose: quantify disability in multiple sclerosis

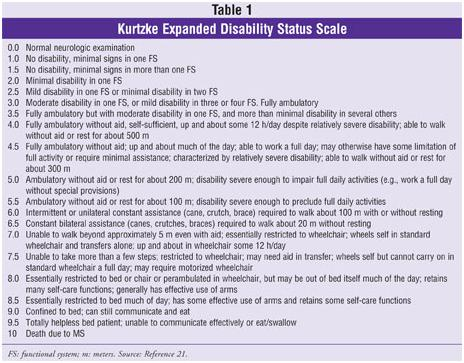
The Kurtzke Expanded Disability Scale.

The Kurtzke Expanded Disability Status Scale (EDSS) is a method of quantifying disability in multiple sclerosis. The scale was originally developed by John F. Kurtzke in 1983. It qualifies disability in eight Functional Systems (FS) and allows neurologists to assign a Functional System Score (FSS) in each of these.

The lower scale values of the EDSS measure impairments based on the neurological examination, while the upper range of the scale (> EDSS 6) measures handicaps of patients with MS. The determination of EDSS 4 – 6 is heavily dependent on aspects of walking ability.

The EDSS is based on a neurological examination by a clinician. However, a number of versions have been developed which enable patient self-administration.

The EDSS has been subject to a number of criticisms, including the fact that it has moderate intra-rater reliability (EDSS kappa values between 0.32 and 0.76 and between 0.23 and 0.58 for the individual FSs were reported), offers poor assessment of upper limb and cognitive function, and lacks linearity between score difference and clinical severity. Other limitations of EDSS include that it relies heavily on the evaluation of motor function and the ability to walk; as such, a patient who might not be able to walk but maintains full dexterity is classified toward the severe end of the scale.

The Neurostatus-EDSS was subsequently developed as an adapted version of J. Kurzke’s 1983 scale, with the aim to improve inter- and intra-rater reliability and consistency in assessments and thus its precision as a tool for the assessment of changes in neurological impairment and disability. To this aim, less ambiguous definitions of the grading than the original scale were provided, without changing the framework of Kurtzke's published definitions (Kappos et al., 2015). In 2011 a digital Version of the Neurostatus-EDSS, the Neurostatus-eEDSS was introduced.

The Neurostatus-EDSS summarizes more than 100 single tests (optional and mandatory, each graded as subscores) based on a standardized neurological examination into 7 Functional System Scores (FSS) and 1 Ambulation Score (AS), ultimately contributing to a single EDSS Step determination.

The range of the EDSS Step includes 20 half steps from 0 to 10, with EDSS Step 0 corresponding to a completely normal examination and EDSS Step 10 to death due to MS.

The Neurostatus-EDSS has been used in the majority of Phase 2 and 3 clinical trials for MS medications, as well as in large real-world MS cohorts (e.g. Swiss Multiple Sclerosis Cohort, SMSC) registries (e.g. MSBase) and academic studies in the past three decades, in order to document and quantify the course of clinical symptoms.

The Neurostatus-EDSS was developed by Neurostatus-UHB AG, part of the University Hospital Basel

Other validated assessment measures used in MS trials include the Timed 25-Foot Walk, the Multiple Sclerosis Functional Composite, and the Short Form (36) Health Survey.

== Functional systems ==
Kurtzke defines functional systems as follows:

- pyramidal
- cerebellar
- brainstem
- sensory
- bowel and bladder
- visual
- cerebral
- other

The Neurostatus-EDSS maintains this classification into 7 functional systems, with the addition of ambulation.

== Results and clinical meaning ==
The clinical meaning of each possible result is the following:

- 0.0: Normal Neurological Exam
- 1.0: No disability, minimal signs in 1 FS
- 1.5: No disability, minimal signs in more than 1 FS
- 2.0: Minimal disability in 1 FS
- 2.5: Mild disability in 1 or Minimal disability in 2 FS
- 3.0: Moderate disability in 1 FS or mild disability in 3 - 4 FS, though fully ambulatory
- 3.5: Fully ambulatory but with moderate disability in 1 FS and mild disability in 1 or 2 FS; or moderate disability in 2 FS; or mild disability in 5 FS
- 4.0: Fully ambulatory without aid, up and about 12hrs a day despite relatively severe disability. Able to walk without aid 500 meters
- 4.5: Fully ambulatory without aid, up and about much of day, able to work a full day, may otherwise have some limitations of full activity or require minimal assistance. Relatively severe disability. Able to walk without aid 300 meters
- 5.0: Ambulatory without aid for about 200 meters. Disability impairs full daily activities
- 5.5: Ambulatory for 100 meters, disability precludes full daily activities
- 6.0: Intermittent or unilateral constant assistance (cane, crutch or brace) required to walk 100 meters with or without resting
- 6.5: Constant bilateral support (cane, crutch or braces) required to walk 20 meters without resting
- 7.0: Unable to walk beyond 5 meters even with aid, essentially restricted to wheelchair, wheels self, transfers alone; active in wheelchair about 12 hours a day
- 7.5: Unable to take more than a few steps, restricted to wheelchair, may need aid to transfer; wheels self, but may require motorized chair for full day's activities
- 8.0: Essentially restricted to bed, chair, or wheelchair, but may be out of bed much of day; retains self care functions, generally effective use of arms
- 8.5: Essentially restricted to bed much of day, some effective use of arms, retains some self care functions
- 9.0: Helpless bed patient, can communicate and eat
- 9.5: Unable to communicate effectively or eat/swallow
- 10.0: Death due to MS
