= Controversies related to ME/CFS =

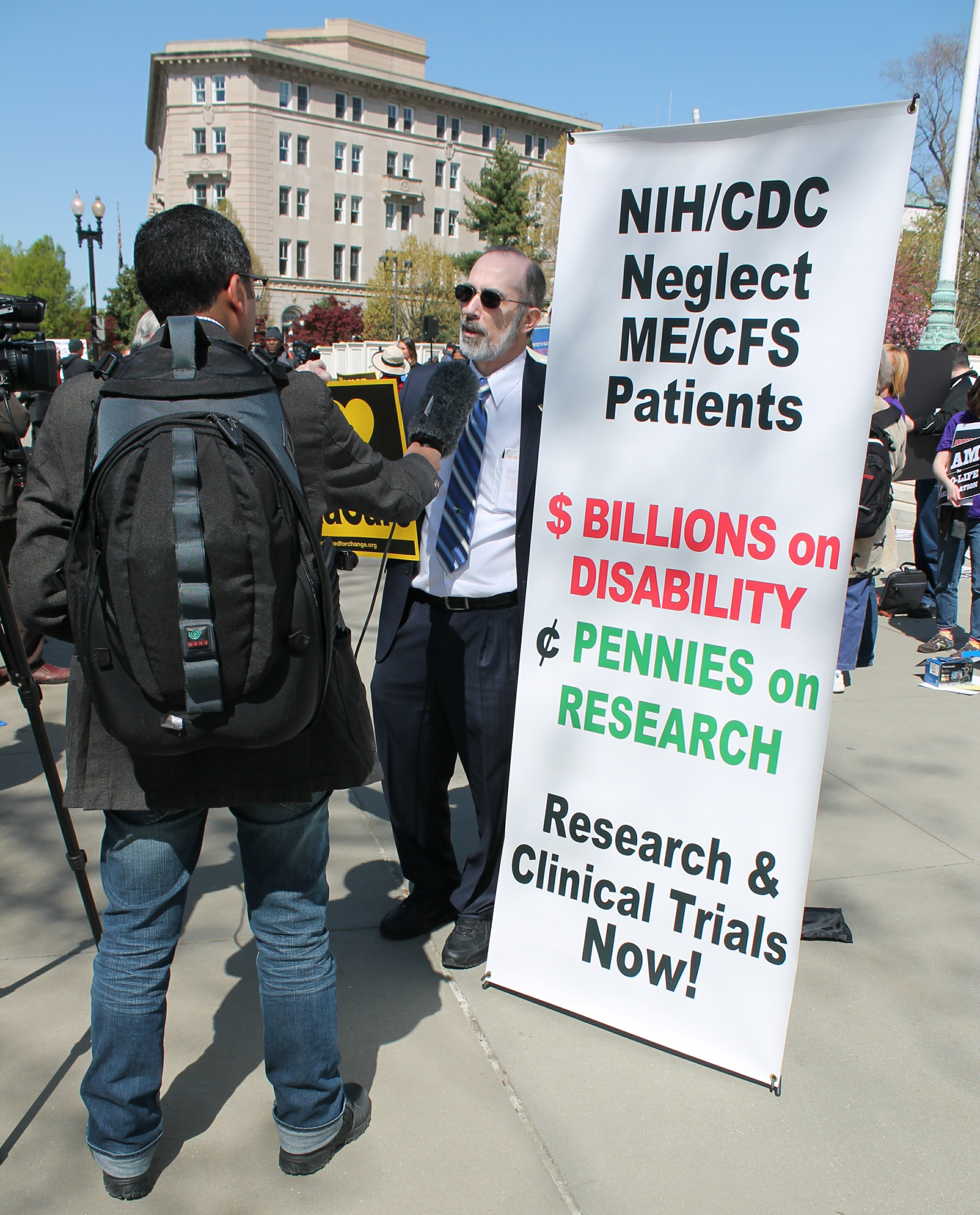
A man at a healthcare reform protest, advocating for increased funding for ME/CFS research

Myalgic encephalomyelitis/chronic fatigue syndrome (ME/CFS) is an illness with a long history of controversy. Some professionals within the medical community do not recognize ME/CFS as a genuine condition, nor is there agreement on its prevalence. There has been much disagreement over the pathophysiology of chronic fatigue syndrome, how it should be diagnosed, and how to treat it.

The diagnosis is controversial, and its nature and etiology are still not fully understood. Alternative names to describe the condition(s) have been used over time throughout the world. Patient groups have criticized the name "chronic fatigue syndrome", saying that it trivializes the illness.

== Neglect and lack of awareness ==
ME/CFS suffers from a lack of awareness among clinical professionals. Despite being a relatively common and disabling disease, a large proportion of professionals are either unaware or dismissive of it. This often leads to patient neglect, which happens in clinical, government, bureaucratic, and research settings.

=== Lack of awareness in clinical settings ===
Despite ample evidence that ME/CFS is an organic disease, many clinicians do not recognise it as genuine or underestimate its seriousness. A 2020 literature review found that "a third to a half of all GPs did not accept ME/CFS as a genuine clinical entity and, even when they did, they lacked confidence in diagnosing or managing it."

A substantial proportion of medical schools do not teach about ME/CFS, and the large majority do not provide clinical exposure to ME/CFS patients. In 2021, the UK NICE found that "medical students reported that there is little or no formal training on ME/CFS in the medical curriculum and that their knowledge often comes from media".

Training influences attitudes towards ME/CFS. One study conducted a relatively brief seminar presenting factual information on the illness to a cohort of fourth year medical students. The authors concluded the information provided was associated with a more favorable attitude toward ME/CFS.

=== Neglect of patients ===
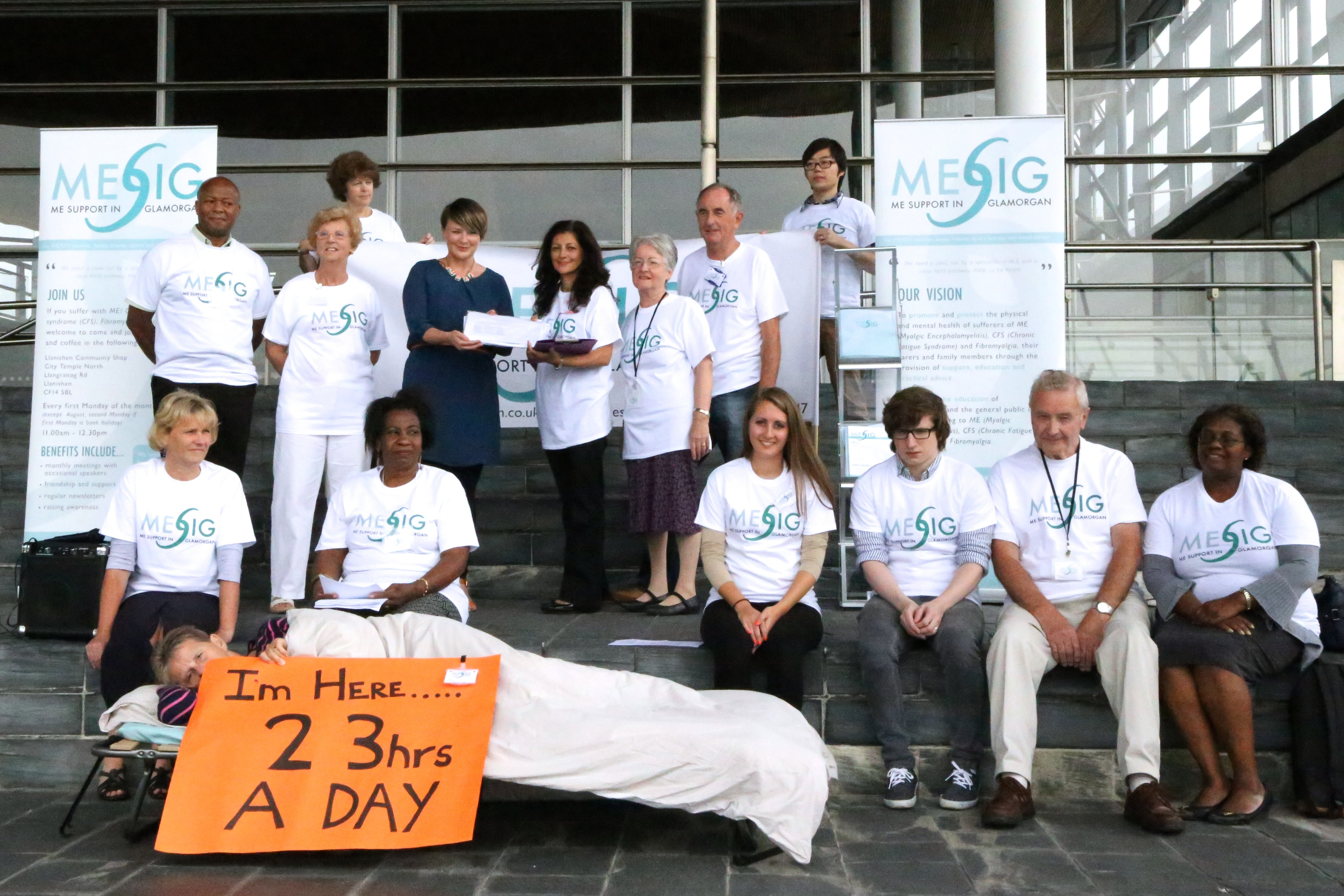
Advocates presenting a petition to the Welsh Parliament requesting specialist care for people with ME/CFS and fibromyalgia

Governments, medical institutions, and the medical community have been criticised for neglecting people with ME/CFS. George Monbiot, a journalist for the Guardian, called the neglect and its consequences "the greatest medical scandal of the 21st century". Individuals with the condition describe the struggle for healthcare and legitimacy due to what is described as bureaucratic denial of the condition because of its lack of a known etiology. Institutions maintain the exclusion of patient support by rhetorical arguments of the open-endedness of science to delay new findings of fact.

A 2006 investigation by a group from the Parliament of the United Kingdom found there was not enough support in the UK for CFS patients in terms of access to government benefits and health care.

== Mass hysteria accusations ==
Epidemic cases of myalgic encephalomyelitis/chronic fatigue syndrome (ME/CFS) had often historically been described as cases of mass hysteria, suggested by a paper written by psychiatrists McEvedy and Beard in 1970, provoking criticism in letters to the editor of the British Medical Journal by attending physicians, researchers, and nurses who fell ill.

The psychiatrists were criticized for not investigating the patients they described, and their conclusions have been refuted. In 1978, a symposium held at the Royal Society of Medicine (RSM) concluded that epidemic myalgic encephalomyelitis was a distinct disease entity.

However, the idea that ME/CFS may be culturally mediated persisted in some quarters. In her 1997 book Hystories: Hysterical Epidemics and Modern Culture, literary critic and feminist Elaine Showalter argued that the illness is a "hysterical narrative", a modern manifestation of hysteria, a self-perpetuating "cultural symptom of anxiety and stress" historically assigned to women.

== Research related ==
=== Lack of funding ===
Governments and health organisations have been criticised for their lack of funding into ME/CFS research. ME/CFS is one of the most underfunded diseases compared to disease burden. The funds are only approximately 3-7 percent of what comparable diseases are allocated. Meanwhile, the economic impact of ME/CFS is estimated at 149-362 billion USD in the United States alone.

=== XMRV retrovirus ===
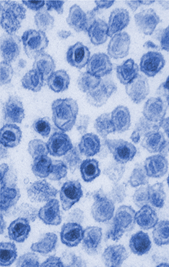
XMRV, a virus claimed to be associated with CFS in a paper that was later retracted

In 2009, the journal Science published a study that identified the XMRV retrovirus in blood samples of a population of people with CFS. After the Science publication, media attention generated interest in the XMRV virus worldwide.

Many countries reacted quickly to protect the blood supply from the XMRV retrovirus by banning persons with CFS from donating blood. The United States funded a 1.3 million dollar study to try to validate the findings, and some people with the illness started taking antiviral drugs in hopes of symptomatic improvement. Organizations adopting these or similar measures included the Canadian Blood Services, the New Zealand Blood Service, the Australian Red Cross Blood Service and the American Association of Blood Banks. In November 2010, the UK National Blood Service permanently deferred ME/CFS patients from donating blood to prevent potential harm to the donor.

Many studies failed to reproduce this finding, and recriminations of misconduct from the various stakeholders grew angry and bitter.

In 2011, the editor of Science formally retracted its XMRV paper while the Proceedings of the National Academy of Sciences similarly retracted a 2010 paper which had appeared to support the finding of a connection between XMRV and CFS. Studies eventually concluded that neither people nor the blood supply had been infected with the XMRV virus, and the origin of the virus was likely a lab contaminant in the supplies used by the polymerase chain reaction (PCR) process of the studies that found virus in blood.

=== PACE trial ===
Outcomes reported by the PACE trial

PACE was a large trial investigating the efficacy and safety of three treatments adjunctive to specialist medical care (SMC): cognitive behavioural therapy (CBT), graded exercise therapy (GET), and adaptive pacing therapy (APT). The results were published in February 2011 and concluded that CBT and GET were each "moderately" effective compared to SMC alone, while APT was not found to be effective when added to SMC.

The trial generated considerable criticism. Letters to the editor critiqued the definitions of secondary outcomes, questioned post-hoc protocol changes, and expressed concern over generalisability of the results. Patient groups and the IACFS/ME (an organization of researchers and health care professionals interested in CFS) criticized the trial for over-simplified and exaggerated conclusions, for using a flawed psychosocial illness model that ignores biological evidence, for testing a non-representative version of pacing, and because the results seriously conflict with their member surveys which show that pacing is effective and CBT or GET can cause deterioration in many patients who use the treatments.

One researcher submitted a 442-page letter to the Medical Research Council outlining his criticisms of the trial, and a shorter 43-page complaint to the Lancet. The MRC and the Lancet rejected the submissions. A Lancet editorial responded to the adverse criticism by suggesting that some critics could be part of "an active campaign to discredit the research." In 2011, Lancet Editor Richard Horton defended the trial, calling the critics "a fairly small, but highly organized, very vocal and very damaging group of individuals who have, I would say, actually hijacked this agenda and distorted the debate so that it actually harms the overwhelming majority of patients."

More recent criticisms of the trial have come from the scientific community. For example, biostatistician Bruce Levin of Columbia University described the study as "the height of clinical trial amateurism", and Ronald Davis of Stanford University wrote, "I'm shocked that the Lancet published it... The PACE study has so many flaws and there are so many questions you'd want to ask about it that I don't understand how it got through any kind of peer review". In an analysis of the study's design, the mathematician Professor Rebecca Goldin wrote that "There were problems with the study on almost all levels... the flaws in this design were enough to doom its results from the start." Professor Jonathan Edwards of University College London (UCL) has written that the PACE trial "is an unblinded trial with subjective outcome measures. That makes it a non-starter in the eyes of any physician or clinical pharmacologist familiar with problems of systematic bias in trial execution."

The full research data for the PACE trial was requested by both patients acting as citizen scientists, and by other researchers but was initially denied until a 2016 tribunal ordered the data be released. Several researchers published a re-analysis of the PACE trial data, but drawing the conclusion that the CBT and GET treatments were not effective and possibly not safe. The full PACE trial outcome data showed that the treatments did not result in patients being able to return to work or study, and that they were not able to walk significantly further after treatment. This new information was one of several factors that lead to the UK deciding to complete a full review and update to its diagnostic and treatment guidelines for ME/CFS. The 2021 guidelines no longer include GET or CBT as treatments.

=== Research funding diversions at the CDC ===
In 1998, William Reaves, a director at the Centers for Disease Control (CDC), alleged deceptive Congressional testimony was given by officials at the agency concerning CFS research activities conducted by the organization; specifically, funds for programs intended for CFS research were diverted to other projects and not reported. He also stated he was retaliated against by his superior, Brian Mahy, after he reported the irregularities.

A Government Accounting Office (GAO) investigation disclosed almost 13 million dollars for CFS research had been redirected or improperly accounted for by the CDC. The agency stated the funds were redistributed in order to respond to other public health emergencies. The director of a U.S. national patient advocacy group charged the CDC had a bias against studying the disease.

In response, the CDC pledged reforms to accounting practices to reduce misuse of funds earmarked for specific diseases. Additionally, the money diverted from CFS research was to be restored over a period of three years.

=== Harassment of researchers ===
Researchers have complained of receiving harassment and abuse from ME/CFS patients & activists when working on ME/CFS. While the abuse is primarily directed at researchers looking into psychological aspects of ME/CFS, it has also affected scientists investigating biological mechanisms, such as Myra McClure, who received a "staggeringly shocking" torrent of abuse from patients who believed she had a vested interest in not finding the virus. McClure says that she will not be pursuing any more research into ME/CFS.

In 2012, several UK researchers involved in the PACE trial, who adopted the psychosocial perspective, reported to the press that they had been verbally abused by patients, and one reported receiving death threats. A tribunal judge investigated the claims of harassment in relation to the PACE trial. They ruled that the claims of harassment had been "wildly exaggerated by the trial authors and their expert witnesses". Blease and Geragty found "no compelling evidence" the vast majority of ME/CFS patients or their advocacy organizations had adopted "militant political policies or behaviours", and reported ME/CFS activists used public discourse and scientific publications analogous to 1980s "AIDS" activists. They concluded the medical establishment's negative perception of persons with ME/CFS and indifference to patients' opinions provided a better explanation for the ME/CFS community's discontent.

== Harms to patients ==
=== Harmful treatments ===
Reports of medical harm to patients resulting from the use of cognitive behavioral therapy (CBT) as a primary treatment and the use of graded exercise therapy (GET) have arisen. A controversial clinical trial of the Lightning Process in children, led to it being specifically forbidden in the NICE guidelines. A number of publications by Esther Crawley promoting GET have been corrected due to inaccurate ethics statements.

=== Deaths and suicide ===
Studies show medical neglect, trivialisation, and psychologization have contributed to increased risk of suicide in patients suffering from ME/CFS. In some severe cases, neglect by clinicians has led to complications of the disease which ultimately led to the death of the patient. Some patients with severe and very severe ME/CFS are unable to swallow or properly digest, when this is neglected or misdiagnosed as a psychological condition (such as anorexia nervosa), malnutrition can follow, with a risk of death. Proper care for patients with severe feeding problems stipulates total parenteral nutrition for short term cases and using feeding tubes for long term cases.

A notable case is that of Maeve Boothby O'Neill, a 27-year-old woman who died from very severe ME/CFS in 2021. As her condition gradually worsened, she became too unwell to properly feed and hydrate herself. At first the NHS doctors gave her feeding aids, but insisted upon feeding her much more than her body could handle which exacerbated her condition through post-exertional malaise. The only feasible option left was total parenteral nutrition, but due to the doctor's belief that her condition was largely psychological, they refused this route. A month later, she died of malnutrition. An inquest into Maeve Boothby O'Neill's death was opened by the Exeter and Devon Coroners, and is currently ongoing. Dr. Anthony Hemsley, the director of the Royal Devon and Exeter NHS Foundation Trust, has testified that the NHS has no policy and no facilities for treating severe (housebound) or very severe (bedbound) patients anywhere in the United Kingdom.

=== Misdiagnosis, under-diagnosis, and delays in diagnosis ===
Because of a lack of awareness and education about ME/CFS in the medical community delays in diagnosis and misdiagnosis are common. A large proportion of ME/CFS patients are undiagnosed; its true prevalence is therefore unknown. ME/CFS patients can be misdiagnosed with a wide variety of conditions, common ones include psychosomatic disease, depression, burnout, and neuresthenia. It is common for diagnosis to take over five years post disease onset, and visits to a large number of medical professionals.

=== Involuntary psychiatric hospitalisation ===
There have been reported cases of forced psychiatric hospitalisation of ME/CFS patients. In these cases clinicians wrongly assumed ME/CFS was of psychological origin, or misdiagnosed a mental illness.

A notable case is that of Sophia Mirza, the first woman in the United Kingdom to have ME/CFS listed officially as a cause of death. Mirza was forcibly removed from her home and sectioned for two weeks by her doctors, who had come to believe her condition was psychosomatic. Her mother and sister said the treatment severely worsened her condition, through post exertional malaise. Her health deteriorated after being released from the psychiatric unit, and two years later she died. An inquest into her death revealed it to be due to renal failure due to dehydration as a result of chronic fatigue syndrome (evidenced by ganglionitis in the dorsal root ganglia).

== Naming ==
There has been much debate over whether to use the term "Myalgic Encephalomyelitis" or "Chronic Fatigue Syndrome" to describe the condition. As a compromise, most professional publications use the term "Myalgic Encephalomyelitis/Chronic Fatigue Syndrome" (commonly abbreviated as ME/CFS).

The term chronic fatigue syndrome is criticised for focusing on a single symptom, while its use has led many to confuse ME/CFS with general chronic fatigue. Critics argue the term "fatigue" trivialises the illness and discourages research into potential treatments. According to a survey of medical trainees at DePaul University, a condition described as "chronic fatigue syndrome" is considered less serious by the trainees than a condition described as "myalgic encephalopathy".

The term myalgic encephalomyelitis has also been criticised, as the symptom myalgia (muscle pain) is not experienced by everyone with the disease. Additionally, before ME/CFS was considered a biological condition, the name ME was seen as reinforcing the illness as it "legitimised" patient's symptoms.

In 2015, the National Academy of Medicine recommended changing the name to Systemic Exertion Intolerance Disease (SEID).However, this new name has not been widely adopted.

== Disability compensation ==
Despite being a disabling condition that leaves around 75 percent of patients unable to work, people with ME/CFS are often dismissed when applying for disability compensation.

=== UK psychosocial controversy ===
Despite being classified as a biological illness by national health bodies, the Department for Work and Pensions classifies ME/CFS as a psychosocial illness, which means sufferers are entitled to lower benefits. A 2006 report by the UK Parliamentary Group on Scientific Research into Myalgic Encephalomyelitis stated that: "CFS/ME is defined as a psychosocial illness by the Department for Work and Pensions (DWP) and medical insurance companies. Therefore, claimants are not entitled to the higher level of benefit payments. We recognise that if CFS/ME remains as one illness and/or both remain defined as psychosocial then it would be in the financial interest of both the DWP and the medical insurance companies." The Group called for investigation of what they called, "numerous cases where advisors to the DWP have also had consultancy roles in medical insurance companies. Particularly the Company UNUMProvident. Given the vested interest private medical insurance companies have in ensuring CFS/ME remain classified as a psychosocial illness there is blatant conflict of interest here."

The Secretary of State for Work and Pensions responded that "Entitlement to Disability Living Allowance depends on the effects that severe physical or mental disability has on a person's need for personal care and/or their ability to walk, and not on particular disabilities or diagnoses. The benefit is available to people with ME/CFS (which can have a physical basis or a psychological basis, or can be due to a combination of factors) on exactly the same terms as other severely disabled people, and they can qualify for it provided that they meet the usual entitlement conditions." This runs contrary to current scientific evidence which shows ME/CFS is "unambiguously biological".
