= Melvin Ramsay =

British physician

- Born: Andrew Melvin Ramsay; 1901; Preston, Lancashire, England
- Died: 19 March 1990 (aged 88–89)
- Education: University of Aberdeen
- Occupation: Physician
- Employer: Royal Free Hospital
- Organization: ME Association
- Known for: Research on myalgic encephalomyelitis

Andrew Melvin Ramsay (1901–1990) was a British physician, who is known for his research and advocacy on myalgic encephalomyelitis (ME), a chronic disease causing muscle weakness (especially after exertion) and cognitive dysfunction (brain fog).

Ramsay worked as a consultant at the Royal Free Hospital in London during a mysterious 1955 disease outbreak of what later became known as ME. He studied the disease and similar outbreaks elsewhere. Work by Ramsay showed that although ME seldom caused death, the disease could be highly disabling.

Upset by the lack of sympathy for long-term sufferers, he became their lifelong advocate and co-founded the ME Association. In 1986 he published the first case definition of ME. Two research grants are named after him: the Ramsay research grant from the Solve ME/CFS Initiative and the Ramsay Research Fund of the ME Association.

== Early life and career ==
Melvin Ramsay was born in Preston, Lancashire in 1901. He attended secondary school at the Mackie Academy in Stonehaven, Scotland and, in 1923, obtained a Master of Arts degree from the University of Aberdeen and completed an undergraduate medical degree there in 1926.

From 1926 to 1935, he practiced medicine in South Africa. He then returned to the United Kingdom to work at Fulham Hospital. In 1937, he moved to the North Western Fevers Hospital. His duties included the education of nurses and medical undergraduates on the practical aspects of managing infectious diseases. By 1939, he attained an MD degree, again from Aberdeen, based on a thesis investigating findings in 1205 cases of puerperal sepsis, a type of infection that can occur after miscarriage or birth.

Upon the integration of the North Western Fevers Hospital into the Royal Free Hospital in 1947, Ramsay became the consultant physician for the Infectious Diseases Department. Additionally, he served as a consultant for smallpox to the Ministry of Health and worked as a lecturer on infectious diseases at the University of London and at the London School of Hygiene and Tropical Medicine.

== Work on myalgic encephalomyelitis ==
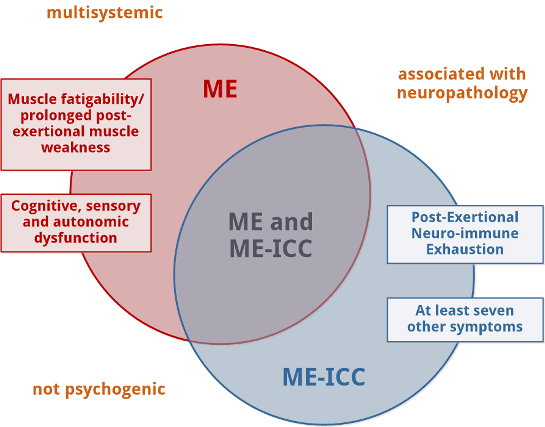
Differences and similarities (in orange) between Ramsay's case definition of ME compared to the International Consensus Criteria of ME.

Ramsay worked in the Royal Free Hospital in 1955 when an unknown infection affecting 300 staff raged between July and November, which required the hospital to close down. The disease, initially dubbed the Royal Free Disease, was renamed benign myalgic encephalomyelits in a Lancet article the following year. Ramsay studied the outbreak and found similar individual cases in north-east London. Furthermore, he described comparable outbreaks in Cumbria, England and Durban, South Africa.

In 1970, two psychiatrists in the UK published a paper concluding that ME outbreaks were forms of hysteria. This was based on the fact that women were affected more than men, and that tests were unable to detect physical changes. Ramsay strongly refuted this finding, but many clinicians accepted that this was a possible explanation.

Ramsay became deeply upset by the absence of empathy extended to individuals enduring long-term suffering from ME, and advocated for them for the rest of his life. In 1976 or 1978 he co-founded the ME Association, a UK research funding and advocacy organisation for people with ME/CFS. He acted as its president for several years, or lifelong and remained active in it until his death.

Work by Ramsay showed that although ME seldom caused death, the disease could be highly disabling. Consequently, the term benign was removed from its description. Ramsay suggested that mitochondrial dysfunction may involved in the muscle fatigue in ME.

In 1986 he published the first case definition of ME in his book Postviral Fatigue Syndrome: The Saga of Royal Free Disease. In a second edition of the same book (now renamed Myalgic Encephalomyelitis and Postviral Fatigue States: The Saga of the Royal Free Disease), he named three features of the disease: "(1) muscle fatiguability after minimal exertion and a delay in the restoration of muscle power; (2) cerebral dysfunction, and (3) impaired circulation".

After multiple similar outbreaks in the United States, the US Centers for Disease Control and Prevention proposed a new definition and name of the illness to chronic fatigue syndrome. From this point on, ME became associated with chronic fatigue syndrome. More recently, the hybrid term myalgic encephalomyelitis/chronic fatigue syndrome (ME/CFS) has become standard in clinical use.

Two research grants are named after him: the Ramsay research grant from the U.S. Solve ME/CFS Initiative and the Ramsay Research Fund of the ME Association.

== Personal life and death ==
His wife, Jesse or Jess Ramsay (née Murray) (Note: A newspaper detailed the arrival of Jess Murray as Dr Ramsay's fiancée in Molteno) was a fellow Scot. His daughter Louie Ramsay was born Molteno, South Africa in 1929.

Ramsay was deeply religious, and his religion impacted his philosophy of life. Ronald Emold, with whom he co-authored a book, described him as "compassionate" and "young at heart". He died on 19 March 1990, the year after his wife died.

== Publications ==
=== Books ===
- Ramsay, A. Melvin; Emold, Ronald (1967). Infectious Diseases. Heineman Medical. ISBN 9780433272502.
- Ramsay, A. Melvin (1986). Myalgic Encephalomyelitis and Postviral Fatigue States: The Saga of Royal Free Disease, (originally titled Postviral Fatigue Syndrome: The Saga of Royal Free Disease). Gower Medical. ISBN 978-0906923993.

=== Journal publications ===
- Ramsay, A. Melvin (1965). "Hysteria and "Royal Free Disease."". British Medical Journal. 2 (5469): 1062. ISSN 0007-1447. PMC 1847119.
- Compston, N. D.; Dimsdale, H. E.; Ramsay, A. M.; Richardson, A. T. (1970). "Epidemic Malaise". British Medical Journal. 1 (5692): 362–363. ISSN 0007-1447. PMC 1699022.
- Ramsay, A. M. (1973). "Benign myalgic encephalomyelitis". The British Journal of Psychiatry: The Journal of Mental Science. 122 (570): 618–619. doi:10.1192/bjp.122.5.618-a. ISSN 0007-1250. PMID 4717041.
- Ramsay, A M; Dowsett, E G; Dadswell, J V; Lyle, W H; Parish, J G (1977). "Icelandic disease (benign myalgic encephalomyelitis or Royal Free disease)". British Medical Journal. 1 (6072): 1350. doi:10.1136/bmj.1.6072.1350-a. ISSN 0007-1447. PMC 1607215. PMID 861618.
- Ramsay, A. M. (1978). "'Epidemic neuromyasthenia' 1955–1978". Postgraduate Medical Journal. 54 (637): 718–721. doi:10.1136/pgmj.54.637.718. ISSN 0032-5473. PMC 2425324. PMID 746017.
- Ramsay, A. M.; Rundle, A. (1979). "Clinical and biochemical findings in ten patients with benign myalgic encephalomyelitis". Postgraduate Medical Journal. 55 (650): 856–857. doi:10.1136/pgmj.55.650.856. ISSN 0032-5473. PMC 2425703. PMID 548947.
- Dowsett, E. G.; Ramsay, A. M.; McCartney, R. A.; Bell, E. J. (1990). "Myalgic encephalomyelitis—a persistent enteroviral infection?". Postgraduate Medical Journal. 66 (777): 526–530. doi:10.1136/pgmj.66.777.526. ISSN 0032-5473. PMC 2429637. PMID 2170962.
