= Cynthia Adinig =

American healthcare equity activist

- Born: May 24, 1985 (age 41)
- Occupation: Co-Founder BIPOC Equity Agency
- Known for: Long COVID & ME/CFS Health Equity Advocacy
- Board member of: Solve ME/CFS Initiative
- Children: Aiden Adinig
- Relatives: Chris Henry (wide receiver) (step-brother)
- Website: www.cynthiaadinig.com

Cynthia Adinig (born 1985) is an African-American healthcare equity activist. She is based in Northern Virginia.

== Personal life ==
Adinig grew up in Cincinnati, Ohio. Her step-brother was NFL player Chris Henry. In 2016, only a few months after her son's first birthday, her sister, Shari Lee died from renal failure at 37 years old. Her sister and step brother's death helped to further catalyze Cynthia's involvement improving healthcare and health equity for communities of color.

Adinig's son Aiden Adinig, became known as a math prodigy at 3 years old. He developed Long COVID at 4 years old. He became a member of Mensa International at 5 years old.

== Career ==
Adinig's advocacy in Long COVID began after being threatened with arrest while seeking care for serious long COVID complications, that she filmed live, that was eventually featured in The Washington Post. She is part of the team that helped developed legislative language for the COVID-19 Long Haulers Act, and she spoke alongside the bill's sponsors Rep. Don Beyer and Rep. Jack Bergman at the press conference of the unveiling of the bill. She also met with Senator Tim Kaine's and Ayanna Pressley's teams for their Long COVID legislation as well.

Adinig is featured in, a Long COVID and ME/CFS documentary, three-part series: Long Haul Voices: Living with Long Covid and ME/CFS.

Adinig co-founded BIPOC Equity Agency, a consulting agency advancing racial equity and support for underserved communities that specializes in research and healthcare.

She is also on the advisory boards of Consuli, and Wail of A Tail. She is a board member of the Solve ME/CFS Initiative (Solve M.E.). Adinig has worked with a variety of Long COVID and ME/CFS advocacy organizations, most notably the Covid-19 Longhaulers Advocacy Project and #MEACTION.

She has further helped inform members of congress about long COVID, including working on the team that helped developed legislative language for the Covid-19 Longhaulers Act. In 2021, Adinig testified before the United States House Select Subcommittee on the Coronavirus Pandemic, about her experience with racism, while seeking treatment for Long COVID. She has also met with NIH RECOVER directors, including during their Long COVID listening session

In 2022, Adinig appeared alongside physician Peter C. Rowe in a satellite media tour.

== See also ==
- Impact of the COVID-19 pandemic on the African diaspora
- Racial disparities in the COVID-19 pandemic in the United States
- Race and health in the United States
