= PACE trial =

Controversial study into ME/CFS treatments

The PACE trial was a large and controversial trial which compared the effects of cognitive behavioural therapy (CBT), graded exercise therapy (GET), adaptive pacing therapy, and specialist medical care for people with myalgic encephalomyelitis/chronic fatigue syndrome (ME/CFS).

The results of the trial were published in 2011; the investigators reported that both CBT and GET were "moderately" effective at treating ME/CFS. The results have been questioned due to methodological weaknesses in the study design. For instance, the definition of recovery was weakened after the data was collected, leading to a larger share of recovered participants. Analyses under the original protocol did not find significant effects and concluded that GET is potentially unsafe for patients with ME/CFS. As of 2021, graded exercise therapy and cognitive behavioural therapy (intended as a treatment) are no longer recommended by the National Institute for Health and Care Excellence for people with ME/CFS.

== Initial study and findings ==
The £5 million trial was funded by various branches of the UK government, including the Department for Work and Pensions. Notable authors include psychiatrists Michael Sharpe and Peter White, along with psychotherapist Trudie Chalder.

=== Study design ===
641 patients were selected and divided into four groups. The first group only received specialist medical care (SMC). The second group received SMC and cognitive behavioural therapy (CBT). The third group received SMC and graded exercise therapy (GET). The fourth group received SMC and adaptive pacing therapy (APT), not to be confused with pacing (a recommended management strategy for people with ME/CFS).

SMC consisted of specialists giving advice to patients, such as "to avoid extremes of activity and rest", and the prescription of drugs to help manage symptoms. CBT was done on the basis of a theory that regards ME/CFS as being reversible and that "fear of engaging in activity" and "avoidance of activity" are linked and interact with physiological processes to perpetuate fatigue. APT consisted of telling patients not to do activity, if it increases their symptoms; however, patients were encouraged to increase activity if their symptoms were manageable. GET was done on the basis of theories that assumed that ME/CFS is perpetuated by reversible physiological changes of deconditioning and avoidance of activity.

Outcome measures were assessed at the beginning of the trial, and then at 12, 24, and 52 weeks. Subjective outcome measures included self-rated fatigue and physical functioning questionnaires. Objective outcome measures were a six-minute walking test, a fitness test, reception of benefits due to illness, and number of days out of work due to illness. Two and a half years later, there was another follow up using only subjective measures.

The study design had various strengths. The large sample size and randomised allocation of patients into groups of near equal size, increased the precision of findings and, therefore, the likelihood of finding statistically significant outcomes. Additionally the subjects received a substantial amount of therapy (GET or CBT), over an extended duration, which contributed increased precision in the findings.

=== Initial findings ===
Subjective outcomes at 52 weeks reported by the PACE trial

The findings were published in 2011 and concluded GET and CBT were "moderately effective" treatments. 52 weeks after the beginning of the trial, self-reported fatigue scores were significantly lower and self-rated physical function scores significantly higher for the GET and CBT groups than for the SMC and APT groups. The average scores on a 6-minute walking distance test were higher for the GET group than for the other groups. However, the mean distance walked (334 metres) was still well below the mean for healthy elderly people (631 metres) and over 30% of patients in the GET group did not do the test at 52 weeks. The CBT group did not perform significantly differently from the SMC and APT groups on this measure. The results from a step fitness at 52 weeks test showed no significant differences in performance across groups.

A 2013 paper examined the proportion of patients who could be classified as "recovered" after the trial. A patient was considered recovered if they obtained a specified threshold score on the fatigue and physical function self-report scales, if they rated their health as "much better" or "very much better", and if they also failed to meet the authors' case definition of CFS. According to the primary measures of recovery reported in the paper, 22% recovered after CBT, 22% after GET, but only 8% after APT and 7% after SMC.

Although patients were selected based on the Oxford Criteria (which is much broader than modern definitions of ME/CFS, only requiring chronic fatigue as a symptom), subgroup analysis found equivalent results for patients meeting the Oxford criteria and London ME criteria or the 1994 CDC criteria.

A follow-up conducted 2.5 years after the commencement of the trial reported no significant differences between the various treatment groups on the primary self-report measures. That is, the treatment-specific effects evident at 52 weeks were no longer evident at 2.5 years.

== Controversies and criticism ==
After being published, the trial generated considerable criticism and concerns which were voiced through letters to the editor, patient groups, and groups of researchers and healthcare professionals. Lancet Editor Richard Horton defended the trial, calling the critics "a fairly small, but highly organized, very vocal and very damaging group of individuals who have, I would say, actually hijacked this agenda and distorted the debate so that it actually harms the overwhelming majority of patients."

The study continued receiving criticism from within the scientific community. Ronald Davis of Stanford University wrote, "I'm shocked that the Lancet published it […] The PACE study has so many flaws and there are so many questions you'd want to ask about it that I don't understand how it got through any kind of peer review". In an analysis of the study's design, the mathematician Professor Rebecca Goldin wrote that "There were problems with the study on almost all levels […] the flaws in this design were enough to doom its results from the start."

=== Outcome switching ===
After the initial data was collected, the method for scoring the subjective primary outcome measures of patient reported physical functioning and patient reported fatigue was changed, i.e. it used a more sensitive measure of the same primary outcome. Outcome switching is a practice that can lead to bias and undermine reliability, as studies may cherry pick a statistically significant outcome. According to the authors, the switch was done in order to "improve the variance of the measure" and was "approved by the independent PACE Trial Steering Committee and Data Monitoring and Ethics Committee". An analysis under the original protocol found no statistically significant difference in improvement rates. The improvement rates in the GET and CBT groups were around 20%, rather than the 60% reported with switched outcomes.

There was also a change in how recovery (a secondary outcome) was defined. One of the original requirements was that patients would need to score over 85 on a survey of physical functioning, indicative of what healthy working-age people score. This was changed to a score of over 60. This meant that some were above 60 on this metric at the start of the trial, as the criterion for entry was a score of under 65. However, no patients were counted as recovered at trial entry, as they also needed to not meet the Oxford, CDC or London criteria for ME/CFS any more, and rate their overall health as much or very much better in order to be classed as recovered. Recovery rates under the original protocol were much lower and no statistical difference was found between the groups.

=== Subjective primary outcome measures ===
There has been considerable criticism due to the original findings only being supported by subjective (participant reported) primary outcome measures. Professor Jonathan Edwards of University College London wrote that "[the use of subjective outcome measures in an unblinded trial] makes [the PACE trial] non-starter in the eyes of any physician or clinical pharmacologist familiar with problems of systematic bias in trial execution."

The authors responded that a number of objective measures were taken, and the GET group had significant improvement in the 6 minute walking time. However, this was the only statistically significant improvement in objective outcome measures. In a reanalysis of the data Wilshire et al. noted that over 30% of the GET group did not complete the walking test, and that the GET group only walked 10% farther than controls after a year of exercise therapy. The other objective outcome measures included a fitness test, employment, and reception of disability benefits. None of these measures yielded a statistically significant improvement. The authors replied that participants may have lost their job after becoming ill, and that getting better and getting a job are not the same. The authors said they chose patient-reported primary outcomes as they thought patients themselves were the best people to judge the state of their own health.

=== Possible placebo from patient newsletter ===
The patient newsletter given throughout the study subtly praised CBT, GET, and "activity management" by saying a government committee had approved them as treatments, while critiquing biomedical research in ME/CFS. This raised concerns of a possible placebo effect, especially given the subjective outcome measures.

The authors responded that the newsletter's mention of the NICE guidelines included all 3 treatments being compared in the trial. However, the newsletter did not include "adaptive pacing therapy", it did include "activity management" of which adaptive pacing therapy might be classified as a subtype. David Tuller of University of California, Berkeley replied that trial participants would not necessarily be aware that the authors considered "adaptive pacing therapy" as a subtype of "activity management". He also said that, even if all three treatments were included, the positive bias resulting from it will impact the reliability of the trial outcomes.

=== Alleged lack of informed consent ===
Multiple authors of the PACE trial noted potential conflicts of interest in their scientific publications, having worked for or received royalties from disability insurance companies who would benefit from there being a treatment for ME/CFS. These potential conflicts of interest, however, were not disclosed to trial participants. 42 scientists criticised this in an open letter saying it meant there was a lack of informed consent and breached the Helsinki Protocol.

=== Request for data and allegations of harassment ===
The full research data for the PACE trial was requested by both patients acting as citizen scientists, and by other researchers, in order to verify the results through reanalyses. However, the request was initially denied and several of the researchers involved in the PACE trial, reported to the press that they had been verbally abused by patients. This was criticised by patients and advocates as being a coordinated effort to dismiss legitimate concerns about the methodology behind psychosocial studies into ME. However, these allegations continued to gain traction, and some of the authors began saying they were harassed on Twitter (now X).

The argument that ME/CFS patients and their organisations were militant and using methods of harassment was used by the authors to argue against a release of the trial's data. The Information Commissioner dismissed these claims as "wild speculations" and the tribunal found them to be "grossly exaggerated". The judge subsequently ordered a release of the data.

=== Reanalysis ===
After the data was accessed through a Freedom of Information request, researchers published a reanalysis of the PACE trial data, and concluded that the CBT and GET treatments were "not effective and unsafe" and "potentially harmful". The full PACE trial data showed that the treatments did not result in patients being able to return to work or study, and that they were not able to walk significantly further after treatment.

The reanalysis using the original primary outcome measures still showed there was a small improvement in one of the two subjective measures at 52 weeks for the GET and CBT groups. However, this difference was not sustained in the long-term follow-up. The GET group experienced twice the rate of adverse outcomes compared to controls, hence the conclusion that the treatment may be unsafe.

== Health Research Authority inquiry ==
The UK Health Research Authority began an inquiry into the PACE trial in 2018, in response to questions from MP Carol Monaghan. The inquiry looked into conflicts of interest, making data publicly available to other researchers, and whether changing the outcome measures was appropriate. The HRA published its findings in January 2019, and found that the PACE trial exceeded transparency expectations, and there were no regulatory concerns regarding the conduct of the trial. They note that some of the other criticisms of the trial that were brought to their attention are outside their remit, so they are unable to comment on them.

== Legacy and influence ==
The PACE trial was a major piece of evidence used by influential health authorities to recommend cognitive behavioural therapy and graded exercise therapy for people with ME/CFS, such as the CDC (US) and NICE (UK). After many years of controversy and criticism of the trial, the CDC (in 2017), then NICE (in 2021) stopped recommending graded exercise therapy and cognitive behavioural therapy (as a treatment). As of 2024, the Cochrane guidelines conclude that GET likely reduces fatigue for those diagnosed under older criteria sets, partially based on evidence from the PACE trial.
