= Peter Rowe =

Peter Rowe may refer to:

- Peter C. Rowe, chronic fatigue syndrome specialist
- Peter Rowe (politician) (1807–1876), U.S. politician from New York
- Peter Rowe (filmmaker) (born 1947), Canadian filmmaker
- Peter Rowe (rugby) (born 1947), Welsh rugby union, and rugby league footballer of the 1960s and 1970s
- Peter Trimble Rowe (1856–1942), first bishop of the Episcopal Diocese of Alaska
- Peter Rowe (judge), (died c. 1403) Irish judge, Lord Chief Justice of Ireland, 1388–1397
- Peter G. Rowe, architect, author, researcher, professor
