= Self-rated health =

Technique for measuring the health of an individual or group

Self-rated health (also called Self-reported health, Self-assessed health, or perceived health) refers to both a single question such as "in general, would you say that your health is excellent, very good, good, fair, or poor?" and a survey questionnaire in which participants assess different dimensions of their own health. This survey technique is commonly used in health research for its ease of use and its power in measuring health.

== Single question ==
Self-rated health measures the present general health and gives answer choices, typically structured like a Likert Scale. The self-rated health question may take different forms. It may be formulated as "in general, would you say that your health is excellent, very good, good, fair, or poor?" as the first question in the SF-36 questionnaire. It may also be formulated as "In general, how would you rate your health today," with the possible choices being "very good" (1), "good" (2), "moderate" (3), "bad" (4) or "very bad" (5), as used by the World Health Organization. All questions do not necessarily have five answer choices; there can be more or less.

The self-rated health question is purposely vague so as to seize people's own assessment of health according to their own definition of health. Although the answer to the self-rated health question is based on what people think—and thus is subjective—it is a statistically powerful predictor of mortality in the general population and has also been shown to predict morbidity.

However, it is also possible that there are systematic differences in how individuals with specific characteristics report their health. A study of data collected from England's annual health survey found that people who reported their health as 'poor', living in areas of high deprivation generally had worse health than those who reported their health as 'poor' living in the least deprived areas. This could mean that using self-reported health data may under-estimate health inequalities or health disparities.

=== Methodological strength ===
==== Validity ====
The strong association between self-rated health and mortality is used as proof that this measurement is valid, because mortality is considered as the most objective measurement of the general health of an individual.

==== Reliability ====
The self-rated health question has been found to be a reliable measurement of general health since respondents rated the same general health assessment within a period where their health was unlikely to change. Despite the reliability of the measurement, the self-rated health question "in general, would you say that you health is excellent, very good, good, fair, or poor?" is particularly vague. Thus, this measurement has low level in reliability test than other self-rated measurements that assess a more specific aspect of health.

== Questionnaires ==
Self-rated health, as measured by a questionnaire, attempts to measure health in all its dimensions. In such a questionnaire, participants answer a series of questions which are typically structured using a Likert Scale. The SF-36 questionnaire is an example of tool for self-assessed overall health. The SF-36 questionnaire addresses several dimensions of physical and mental health.

== Uses of self-rated health ==
Considering that self-reported health is a powerful predictor of mortality and considering its easy application, this subjective measure of health is often used in health research and large-scale surveys. This measure helps follow the evolution of health across time and between populations.

=== Publication ===
- Syed Ziaur Rahman (2016). Self-rated memory of individuals' associated with demographic profiles, lifestyle parameters, health status and medication use. Ibn Sina Academy of Medieval Medicine and Sciences. ISBN 978-93-80610-24-5.

== See also ==
- Behavioral medicine
- Chronic illness
- Global Forum for Health Research
- Health
- Health promotion
- Malaise
- Severity of illness
- Sickness behavior
- Stress (biology)
