= Management of ME/CFS =

Aspect of healthcare

Management of ME/CFS (myalgic encephalomyelitis/chronic fatigue syndrome) focuses on symptoms management, as no treatments that address the root cause of the illness are available. Pacing, or regulating one's activities to avoid triggering worse symptoms, is the most common management strategy for post-exertional malaise. Clinical management varies widely, with many patients receiving combinations of therapies. The prognosis of ME/CFS is poor, with recovery considered "rare".

There are no Food and Drug Administration-approved medications for ME/CFS, although medications are sometimes used without approval for the illness (off-label). Drugs have been used in experimental studies of the illness that have not been approved for market for any condition in the United States (for example, isoprinosine and rintatolimod). Rintatolimod has been approved for import and use in Argentina.

== Pacing ==
Pacing (activity management) is a management strategy rather than a therapy. Pacing encourages behavioral change, but unlike cognitive behavioural therapy, acknowledge the typical patient fluctuations in symptom severity and experience delayed exercise recovery. Pacing does not require patients to increase their activity levels unless they feel able to do so. Patients are advised to set manageable daily activity/exercise goals and balance their activity and rest to avoid possible over-doing which may worsen their symptoms. A small randomised controlled trial concluded pacing with GET had statistically better results than relaxation/flexibility therapy. A 2008 patient survey by Action for ME found pacing to be the most helpful treatment and a 2009 survey of two Norwegian patient organizations (ME-association and MENiN) had found that 96% evaluated pacing as useful. In 2019, a large UK survey found that pacing led to greater improvements in patients' physical health, although a minority did report becoming worse.

=== Energy envelope theory ===
Energy envelope theory is a form of pacing that states patients should aim to stay within their "envelope" of available energy, as exceeding this limit can lead to the worsening of symptoms after mental and physical exertion (post-exertional malaise), allowing for "modest" gains in functioning as a result. Energy envelope theory is considered to be consistent with pacing, and is a management strategy suggested in the 2011 international consensus criteria for ME, which refers to using an "energy bank budget". Energy envelope theory was first described in 1999. Several studies have found energy envelope theory to be a helpful management strategy for CFS, noting that it reduces symptoms and may increase functioning. Energy envelope theory does not recommend unilaterally increasing or decreasing activity and is not intended as a therapy or cure for CFS.

Energy Envelope Theory has been promoted by various patient groups.

=== Pacing with a heart rate monitor ===
Some patient groups recommend pacing using a heart rate monitor to increase awareness of exertion, and to allow patients to stay within their aerobic threshold envelope. Randomized controlled trials of pacing using a heart rate monitor are lacking.

=== Spoon theory ===
Spoon theory is a way of understanding activity management in chronic illness and is based on the idea that each patient has a limited number of "spoons", with each spoon representing their available energy. A healthy person has an unlimited amount of available energy each day, but a person with chronic illness has a limited amount and must choose which activities to do. Spoon theory is commonly used by people with CFS.

== Cognitive behavioral therapy ==
Cognitive behaviour therapy (CBT) can be used to help people cope with their illness, and by teaching individuals to better management of rest and activity within the boundaries of their energy constraints, and does not actively attempt to improve the patient's physical or psychological capacity. This type of intervention does not assume the symptoms originate from maladaptive illness beliefs. The CDC currently suggests supportive counseling may be helpful in coping with the impact of the illness, but does not directly suggest CBT.

NICE state that CBT should not be offered as a cure. According to the cognitive-behavioural model of CFS, it is the patient's interpretation of symptoms that primarily shapes their behaviour and perpetuates the illness, and that changing these can lead to complete recovery. Cognitive behavioral therapy (CBT) based on this model attempts to reverse patients' symptoms by altering their interpretation of their symptoms and/or the behaviours they engage in as a result. In 2016, an ARHQ addendum downgraded the evidence for CBT and stated it should not be used as a primary treatment.

A 2010 meta-analysis of trials that objectively measured physical activity before and after CBT showed that although CBT effectively reduced patients' fatigue questionnaire scores, activity levels were not improved by CBT and changes in physical activity were not related to changes in fatigue questionnaire scores. They conclude that the effect of CBT on fatigue questionnaire scores is not mediated by a change in physical activity. According to the authors of a 2014 systematic review, the lack of changes to objectively measured physical activity contradict the cognitive behavioural model of CFS and suggest that patients still avoided postexertional symptom exacerbations and adapted to the illness rather than recovered from it.

CBT has been criticised by patients' organisations because of negative reports from many of their members which have indicated that CBT can sometimes make people worse, a common result across multiple patient surveys. One such survey conducted by Action for ME in 2001 found that out of the 285 participants who reported using CBT, 7% reported it to be helpful, 67% reported no change, and 26% reported that it made their condition worse. A large survey commissioned in the UK by NICE for the guidelines review found that CBT for CFS was not effective for more than half of people with CFS, and patients were more likely to get worse physically than to improve.

== Graded exercise therapy ==
Graded exercise therapy (GET) is a programme of physical activity that starts very slowly and gradually increases over time in fixed increments. Most public health bodies, including the CDC and NICE, consider it ineffective, and its safety is disputed. In particular, NICE removed their recommendation for this treatment in 2021.

A 2019 Cochrane review of 8 studies concluded that GET probably reduces fatigue but that evidence on long-term effectiveness and potential harms are very limited. Effects obtained with exercises were greater than pacing but similar to those obtained with CBT. The studies analyzed employed older definitions of CFS, so the effects on current patient cohorts may be different.

== Recovery ==
A 2014 systematic review reported that estimates of recovery from CFS ranged between 0 and 66% in intervention studies and from 2.6 to 62% in naturalistic studies. There was a lack of consensus in the literature on how recovery should be defined, with almost all of the 22 included studies measuring recovery differently. Recovery was operationally defined by reference to, either alone or in combination: fatigue or related symptoms; function; premorbid function; and/or brief global assessment (which was the most common outcome measure, but does not provide information on symptoms and function, and does not "provide assurance that patients have substantially recovered rather than simply improved"). Focusing on only fatigue or function may overestimate recovery rates, because patients may show selective rather than overall change. A patient with reduced self-reported fatigue may still experience functional disruptions, pain, sleep disturbances, or malaise. "Recovery" in the reviewed studies was often based on limited assessments, less than a full restoration of health, and self-reports with a general lack of more objective measures. In the absence of definitive measures, recovery criteria should set high but reasonable standards for behavioural recovery which approach restoration of pre-morbid health. When objective measures are used, such as the relatively objective behavioural measure of actigraphy, the results have been contrary to the cognitive behavioural model of CFS which predicts increased physical functioning as a result of intervention, as otherwise 'successful' trials did not find significant changes in physical activity. The authors state "a more modest interpretation of 'recovery' might characterize such outcomes as successful adaptation of illness-related behaviour and attitudes to ongoing but perhaps diminished illness", "improved or recovered patients may have continued to avoid activity levels that provoked debilitating postexertional symptom flare-ups", which "would seem to be more consistent with a hypothesis of successful adaptation rather than recovery". It was concluded that more precise and accurate labels other than "recovery" (e.g. clinically significant improvement) may be more appropriate and informative for the improvements reported in previous research, and in keeping with commonly understood conceptions of recovery from illness, recommended a consistent definition of recovery that "captures a broad-based return to health with assessments of both fatigue and function as well as the patient's perceptions of his/her recovery status" and "the recovery time following physical and mental exertion".

== Drugs ==
No pharmacological treatments have been established as a cure for ME/CFS, but various drugs are used to manage the symptoms of ME/CFS.

In subsets of patients, various viruses and bacteria have been reported as the causative agents of ME/CFS, although consistent and compelling supportive evidence is still lacking. A number of antiviral and antibacterial treatment studies have been conducted with inconsistent results.

=== Rintatolimod ===
Nucleic acid (double-stranded RNA) compounds represent a potential class of pharmaceutical products that are designed to act at the molecular level, it is an inducer of interferon and is considered to be antiviral and immunomodulatory.

After being used to successfully treat some patients since the late 1980s, one RCT evaluated rintatolimod and found an overall beneficial effect. In December 2009 the U.S. Food and Drug Administration (FDA) refused to approve a New Drug Application (NDA) by the developer of the drug (Hemispherx Biopharma) to market and sell Ampligen for treatment of ME/CFS. The FDA concluded that the two RCTs submitted "did not provide credible evidence of efficacy."

Hemispherx Biopharma performed additional analyses on their data and submitted a new NDA to the FDA in 2012. After reviewing the data, the FDA did not approve the application citing "insufficient safety and efficacy data".

Rintatolimod has achieved statistically significant improvements in primary endpoints in Phase II and Phase III double-blind, randomized, placebo-controlled clinical trials with a generally well tolerated safety profile and supported by open-label trials in the United States and Europe.

Rintatolimod has been approved for marketing and treatment for persons with ME/CFS in Argentina, and in 2019 the U.S. FDA regulatory requirements were met for exportation of rintatolimod from the United States to Argentina.

=== Antidepressants ===
Antidepressants are often prescribed to ME/CFS patients. Their purpose can be to treat secondary depression or mood swings, but low dosage tricyclic antidepressants are sometimes prescribed to improve sleep quality and reduce pain.

The evidence for antidepressants is mixed and their use remains controversial. In a review of pharmacological treatments for ME/CFS, five trials of antidepressants were included but only one of these reported a statistically significant improvement in symptoms and this effect was only observed in patients who received 12 weeks of CBT before starting treatment with mirtazapine.

=== Stimulants ===
Psychostimulants such as amphetamine, methylphenidate, and modafinil have been studied in the treatment of CFS.

=== Hormones ===
Treatment with steroids and thyroid hormones, such as hydrocortisone, fludrocortisone, and nasal flunisolide, has been studied.

The evidence for corticosteroids is limited. A 2006 systematic review examined RCTs of steroids, primarily hydrocortisone, which found one with a significant difference between groups for fatigue, but two other RCTs found no benefit for steroid treatment. The study which showed statistical significance was noted as scoring poorly for validity.

During a randomized, double-blind trial conducted between 1992 and 1996, hydrocortisone treatment (at a higher dose of 20–30 mg) was associated with some statistical improvement in symptoms of ME/CFS. However, the authors concluded that the degree of adrenal suppression precludes its practical use for ME/CFS. Additionally, long-term use of these medications carry risks of steroid-induced osteoporosis and muscle atrophy.

Fludrocortisone is commonly used for patients with postural orthostatic tachycardia syndrome (POTS) to treat orthostatic intolerance. Given the high comorbidity rate between ME/CFS and POTS, it's possible that fludrocortisone could reduce symptoms in these patients. However, there is no research available which examines its effect on comorbid ME/CFS and POTS.

=== NADH ===
There is some evidence that NADH is of benefit for CFS patients, particularly in combination with CoQ10.

=== Immunotherapy ===
==== Rituximab ====
A potential use for rituximab was identified by two Norwegian doctors who were treating people who had cancer with rituximab; two people also had chronic fatigue syndrome and the CFS improved. As of 2017 this use had been explored in some small clinical trials and was undergoing some larger ones; it was unclear as of 2017 whether there is enough benefit in light of the known adverse effects, for rituximab to be a viable treatment for ME/CFS. Results from the 2-year randomized, placebo-controlled, double-blind, multicenter RituxME trial comparing multiple brands of rituximab infusions with placebo in 151 ME/CFS patients concluded that "B-cell depletion using several infusions of rituximab over 12 months was not associated with clinical improvement in patients with ME/CFS," and thirty-four patients had serious events. "

==== Staphylococcal toxoid vaccine ====
A staph vaccine against staphylococcus toxoid (Staphypan Berna) has been studied, but it is not used due to lack of evidence that it helps and concerns about side effects.

==== Interferon ====
A systematic review found two small RCTs that evaluated interferon. One RCT found an overall beneficial effect and the other showed some positive effects in relation to immunological outcomes only. The quality of both of these studies was considered poor. A 2007 review of research needs for ME/CFS concluded that trials for interferon beta are an important priority.

==== IgG ====
A systematic review found five RCTs to have assessed the effects of immunoglobulin treatment for ME/CFS; of these, two RCTs showed an overall beneficial effect and two RCTs showed some positive results, although in one of the studies this was for physiological effects only. The largest of the RCTs found no effect for the treatment. Another review concluded that "Given the weak evidence of benefit for immunotherapy, the potential harms indicate that it should not be offered as a treatment for CFS."

== Alternative medicine ==
In the absence of proven treatments, alternative medicine treatments are often tried in CFS. Some of these therapies are ineffective while others have not been studied enough to prove any effect. Many studies of alternative treatments for CFS suffer from a high risk of bias.

== Dietary supplements ==
A 2008 review found insufficient evidence to recommend dietary supplements as a treatment in ME/CFS.

=== Carnitine ===
L-Carnitine is an amino acid which includes ALC, a group of natural compounds that have an important role in cellular function. It is required for the transport of fatty acids into the mitochondria during the breakdown of lipids (fats) for the generation of metabolic energy including in muscles and in the brain. Two RCTs found benefit from dietary supplementation with L-carnitine or its esters. A 2006 systematic review reported one RCT with overall benefit, although there was no placebo control.

In 2008 a randomised double-blind placebo-controlled six-month trial on 96 aged subjects with CFS symptoms administering acetyl L-carnitine was reported. By the end of the treatment, significant differences between the two groups were found for both physical and mental fatigue and improvements in both the cognitive status and physical functions. A 2002 double‐blind randomized controlled trial with 53 patients found no difference in fatigue severity between groups when given a supplement containing 1200 mg carnitine.

=== Essential fatty acids ===
A randomized controlled trial on patients diagnosed with post viral fatigue syndrome (PVFS) and deficient RBC levels, using essential fatty acids consisting of evening primrose oil containing n-6 GLA together with fishoil concentrate containing n-3 EPA and DHA showed significant overall improvement in symptoms and RBC essential fatty acid levels. However a subsequent RCT trying to replicate this study found no significant differences between the treatment and placebo group after treatment, and no significant differences in pre-treatment red-cell membrane lipids between the two groups. The different results may be explained by the patient selection: the first trial tested people with PVFS, whereas the second used the Oxford criteria for CFS. Also, the first trial used paraffin while the second trial used sunflower oil which is better tolerated and less likely to adversely affect the placebo group.

=== Magnesium ===
Positive results from a trial of magnesium delivered by injection to magnesium-deficient CFS patients were published in 1991, but three subsequent studies did not find magnesium deficiency as a general problem in CFS patients. A 2008 review concluded that there is no good evidence that intramuscular magnesium is of benefit in CFS.

=== Vitamin B_{12} ===
Both oral and injected vitamin B_{12} have been suggested as treatments for generalized fatigue since the 1950s, however recent studies do not suggest any benefit from it, either for generalized fatigue or CFS specifically. Further research is needed, however, as studies to date have been small and used inconsistent dosing regimens.
