= Michael Sharpe =

Michael Sharpe may refer to:

- Michael Sharpe (cricketer) (born 1966), New Zealand cricketer
- Michael Sharpe (psychiatrist), British psychiatrist
- Michael Sharpe (singer), British singer

== See also ==
- Mike Sharpe (disambiguation)
- Michael Sharp (disambiguation)
