= David Tuller =

American journalist and academic

- Born: c. 1957
- Occupations: Journalist, Public Health Expert

David Tuller is a journalist and public health lecturer at the University of California, Berkeley Center for Global Public Health. He spent his early career covering HIV/AIDS, then pivoted to ME/CFS.

== Career ==
His career in public health began with AIDS advocacy in the 1980s. He is also the author of Cracks in the Iron Closet: Travels in Gay and Lesbian Russia, a 1997 book on LGBT history and life in Russia based on Tuller's travels and interviews with LGBT Russians.

Currently, he is a senior fellow in public health and journalism at a crowdfunded position at Berkeley. Before it was widely accepted as such, he advocated for the acceptance of myalgic encephalomyelitis/chronic fatigue syndrome (ME/CFS) as a biological condition. In 2015, he published "Trial by Error," a four-part article criticizing the design of the PACE trial, a controversial study that claimed CBT and graded exercise therapy were effective treatments for ME/CFS, and alleging conflicts of interest among the trial's investigators. Proponents of the controversial psychosomatic model, many of which were behind the PACE trial, accused their critics of harassment. Tuller disputed that his work encouraged this, saying his activities follow academic standards. Later, the claims of harassment were found to be “wildly exaggerated” by a tribunal judge.

== Publications ==
- Cracks in the Iron Closet: Travels in Gay and Lesbian Russia (1996, Faber and Faber, ISBN 978-0-57119-890-0)
- Once again, the PACE authors respond to concerns with empty answers (2017, Journal of Health Psychology)
- The 'cognitive behavioural model' of chronic fatigue syndrome: Critique of a flawed model (2019, Health Psychology Open)
- Chronic fatigue syndrome and occupational status: a retrospective longitudinal study (2022, Occupational Medicine)
