= ME Association =

UK charitable organization

The ME Association
- Abbreviation: MEA
- Formation: 1978
- Type: Nonprofit
- Legal status: Registered Charity Number 801279
- Purpose: The UK charity raises funds for medical research, provides support, information and campaign for people with Myalgic Encephalomyelitis & Chronic Fatigue Syndrome in the UK.
- Headquarters: Gawcott
- Region served: United Kingdom
- Official language: English
- Website: meassociation.org.uk

The ME Association is a UK health charitable organization that provides information, advocacy, and services to persons and families affected by ME/CFS (Myalgic encephalomyelitis/chronic fatigue syndrome), and raises funds for research into ME/CFS. It has been reported to be one of the two largest UK charities for ME/CFS.

== Activities ==
The organisation informs its members of developments affecting sufferers, carers, family and friends, via its quarterly magazine ME Essential, its website, and other communication media. It promotes its members' interests in medical and political arenas, and in the media. It produces advice on specific aspects of the illness and its effect on sufferers, particularly in its clinical guidance booklet, 'ME/CFS/PVFS : An exploration of the key clinical issues', which informs both practitioners and patients.

As of 2005, persons with ME/CFS in the UK still had difficulty obtaining treatment literature from their General Practitioners' surgeries. A majority of persons with the illness were able to obtain treatment literature from the ME Association.

The ME Association has conducted a number of patient surveys, including in 2010 and 2015, which have generally reported that most patients found activity pacing one of the most helpful treatments, and they found graded exercise therapy and cognitive behavioral therapy more harmful than helpful.

The ME Association has campaigned for increased biomedical research on ME/CFS and improved treatment within the UK.

The ME Association funds research into ME/CFS, and in 2018 was reported to be funding the running costs of the UK ME/CFS Biobank.

== Positions ==
=== Illness name ===
In 2001, the ME Association decided to use the term Myalgic Encephalopathy rather than Myalgic Encephalomyelitis, stating that they felt this was a more appropriate description and was a name that doctors "cannot simply dismiss on the grounds that it is pathologically inaccurate in relation to ME (or research defined cases of CFS)".

=== Treatments ===
The ME Association (MEA) campaigned against the PACE trial, a very large trial of cognitive behavioral therapy (CBT) and graded exercise therapy (GET) stating that the money should be spent on biomedical research instead and raising concerns about the methodology.

In 2012, a year after the main PACE trial results, the MEA commenced an extensive opinion survey of patients who had used CBT, GET and pacing as interventions for ME/CFS in the UK. They concluded that over 70 percent of patients said exercise therapy worsened their symptoms. Based on the survey's findings, the MEA concluded that GET should not be used for people with ME/CFS. In 2016, the MEA called for graded exercise therapy to be withdrawn and stated that CBT should not be a primary intervention for ME/CFS. In 2018, the MEA repeated that GET should be withdrawn, and this should not be delayed until the ongoing UK's NICE guidelines review was completed.

The 2015 MEA survey results concluded that CBT based on the now disproven assumption that abnormal beliefs and behaviours are responsible for maintaining the illness, are inappropriate, and risked a worsening of symptoms. A CBT practitioner's belief that ME/CFS is a psychological illness also resulted in less symptom improvement, more symptom worsening, and dissatisfaction of treatment by persons with ME/CFS. The MEA stated CBT that counsels patients with practical coping skills and dealing with co-morbid conditions may be appropriate and should be available as required to ME/CFS patients the same as other chronic conditions such as multiple sclerosis, Parkinson's disease, cancer, heart disease, and arthritis etc.

Pacing was considered, "the most effective, safe, acceptable and preferred form of activity management for people with ME/CFS". The MEA recommended it should be the major management strategy.

The ME association was skeptical of the former guidance recommended by The National Institute for Health and Care Excellence (NICE) for primary treatment of ME/CFS. The MEA considers CBT with GET not safe for ME/CFS patients, or not effective. The ME Association recommends that persons with ME/CFS consider a pacing approach to the illness.

In 2017, the ME Association raised concerns about the use of the controversial lightning process, with medical advisor Charles Shepherd claiming it was "pseudoscience" for a treatment to claim effectiveness for so many different illnesses at once.

Additionally, MEA advocates that NICE has not studied the physiological aspects of persons with ME/CFS.

=== Long COVID ===
In 2020, the ME Association's medical advisor said that COVID-19 may lead to some patients developing post-viral fatigue syndrome, which could then lead to ME/CFS. In May 2020, the MEA published several advice leaflets about COVID-19.
