= Mike Sharpe (disambiguation) =

Mike Sharpe (1951–2016) was a Canadian professional wrestler.

Mike Sharpe may also refer to:

- Mike Sharpe (sprinter) (1956–2021), Bermudian sprinter
- Mike Sharpe (1922–1988), Canadian professional wrestler of the Sharpe Brothers duo
- Mike Sharpe, saxophone performer of song "Spooky"

== See also ==
- Michael Sharp (disambiguation)
- Michael Sharpe (disambiguation)
