= Michael Sharp =

Michael Sharp may refer to:

- Michael Eugene Sharp (1954–1997), American serial killer
- Michael William Sharp (1776?–1840), English painter
- Rex Parker (Michael D. Sharp; born 1969), American professor and crossword blogger

== See also ==
- Mike Sharpe (disambiguation)
- Michael Sharpe (disambiguation)
