= SF-12 =

Survey of patient health

The Short Form (12) Health Survey is a 12-item, patient-reported survey of patient health. It is a reduced size version of the SF-36, and is widely used since it produces similar results for physical and mental health scores with far less respondent burden for producing scores of overall mental and physical well-being.
