= The Ruth Rendell Mysteries =

British television crime drama series

- Title card
- Also known as: The Inspector Wexford Mysteries
- Genre: Crime drama; Mystery; Anthology
- Created by: Ruth Rendell
- Starring: George Baker; Louie Ramsay; Christopher Ravenscroft; Ken Kitson; Diane Keen; John Burgess
- Composer: Brian Bennett
- Country of origin: United Kingdom
- Original language: English
- No. of series: 12
- No. of episodes: 84

Production
- Executive producers: Graham Benson; Colin Rogers; Tim Vaughn
- Producers: John Davies; Neil Zeiger
- Production location: United Kingdom
- Running time: 60 minutes
- Production companies: Television South; Meridian Broadcasting; Blue Heaven

Original release
- Network: ITV
- Release: 2 August 1987 – 11 October 2000

The Ruth Rendell Mysteries is a British television crime drama series, produced by TVS and later by its successor Meridian Broadcasting, in association with Blue Heaven Productions, for broadcast on the ITV network. Twelve series were broadcast on ITV between 2 August 1987 and 11 October 2000. Created by author Ruth Rendell, the first six series focused entirely on her main literary character, Chief Inspector Reg Wexford, played by George Baker. Repeat airings of these series changed the programme's title to The Inspector Wexford Mysteries. However, later series shifted focus to other short stories previously written by Rendell, with Wexford featuring in only three further stories, in 1996, 1998 and 2000. When broadcast, these three stories were broadcast under the title Inspector Wexford.

In some cases stories were expanded from Rendell's original material or elements from a number of stories were woven together into one episode. A smaller number of episodes were based on Rendell's full-length novels, such as The Strawberry Tree starring Simon Ward, Going Wrong starring James Callis, A Case of Coincidence starring Keith Barron and Ronald Pickup, Front Seat starring Janet Suzman, and The Lake of Darkness starring Jerome Flynn. A total of fifty-five episodes featured Inspector Wexford, alongside his wife Dora (Louie Ramsay) and his assistant DI Mike Burden (Christopher Ravenscroft). A total of twenty-nine episodes focused on other characters.

The first six series were released on VHS, but have never been released on DVD due to licensing rights issues with The Walt Disney Company, who owns Television South's back catalogue of programming. Series seven to twelve have since been released on DVD as a Best Of box set, omitting four episodes.

== Plot ==
=== Series 1 to 6 ===
Each episode follows the investigations of Chief Inspector Reg Wexford and his team of detectives in the fictional town of Kingsmarkham. The cases they investigate are often complex and involve a range of characters with hidden motives and dark secrets.

The series delves into the psychology of crime, exploring the motives and behaviors of both the perpetrators and the victims. The stories are often dark and gritty, with themes of murder, revenge, jealousy, and betrayal.

Throughout the series, Wexford faces personal challenges and struggles with his own demons, including his complicated relationship with his wife, Dora. Despite his personal troubles, Wexford remains a dedicated and determined detective, committed to solving each case and bringing justice to the victims.

== Cast ==
=== Regulars ===
- George Baker as DCI Reg Wexford (Series 1—6, 9, 11—12)
- Christopher Ravenscroft as DI Mike Burden (Series 1—6, 9, 11—12)
- Louie Ramsay as Dora Wexford (Series 1—6, 9, 11—12)
- Deborah Poplett as Sheila Wexford (Series 1—6, 9, 11)
- Charon Bourke as Sylvia Wexford (Series 2—6, 9, 11—12)
- Emma Smith as Pat Burden (Series 1—6)
- Diane Keen as Jenny Burden (Series 4—6, 9, 11—12)
- Ann Penfold as Jean Burden (Series 1—4)
- Noah Huntley as John Burden (Series 1—4)
- Ken Kitson as DS Caleb Martin (Series 1—6)
- Isobel Middleton as DS Karen Malahyde (Series 2—6, 9, 11—12)
- Colin Campbell as Sgt Willoughby (Series 2—6)
- Dave Hill as DCC Freeborn (Series 3—6)
- John Burgess as Dr. Len Croker (Series 2—6)
- Gary Mavers as Colin Budd (Series 1—6, 9, 11—12)

== Episodes ==
=== Series 1 (1987) ===
No. overall	No. in series	Title	Directed by	Written by	Original release date
1	1	"Wolf to the Slaughter"	John Davies	Clive Exton	2 August 1987
2	2	"Wolf to the Slaughter"	John Davies	Clive Exton	9 August 1987
3	3	"Wolf to the Slaughter"	John Davies	Clive Exton	16 August 1987
4	4	"Wolf to the Slaughter"	John Davies	Clive Exton	23 August 1987
Part 1: One evening someone messes up a love-nest on a side street in a small country town. The carpet is soaked with human blood, but there is no body to be found. Meanwhile, a beautiful, promiscuous woman goes missing - as does the bundle of cash she was carrying. But Wexford and Burden have different theories about the disappearance of the eccentric Anita Margolis.; Part 2: Who is Ann? Who is Geoff Smith? Who sent the anonymous letter? Inspector Wexford and his team appear nowhere nearer solving the mystery. Perhaps if the missing girl's body could be located things would becomes clearer. But where to begin?; Part 3: A gold lighter is found and provides a vital clue to the girl's disappearance. Its inscription reads 'For the girl who lights up my life' but which girl? And where is the body?; Part 4: Wexford and his colleagues now knows the identity of Anita Margolis's killer, but there is a problem - he died some 18 months before the murder. Are the detectives' investigations at a halt?

=== Series 2 (1988) ===
No. overall	No. in series	Title	Directed by	Written by	Original release date
5	1	"A Guilty Thing Surprised"	Mary McMurray	Clive Exton	19 June 1988
6	2	"A Guilty Thing Surprised"	Mary McMurray	Clive Exton	26 June 1988
7	3	"A Guilty Thing Surprised"	Mary McMurray	Clive Exton	3 July 1988
Wexford finds he is dealing with a very nasty case when nature-loving Elizabeth Nightingale is murdered on one of her nightly walks through the woods around Myfleet Manor.
8	4	"Shake Hands Forever"	Don Leaver	Clive Exton	23 September 1988
9	5	"Shake Hands Forever"	Don Leaver	Clive Exton	30 September 1988
10	6	"Shake Hands Forever"	Don Leaver	Clive Exton	7 October 1988
Angela Hathall is murdered, but Wexford can find no motive and no suspect. Maybe she picked up a stranger who killed her? The line Wexford follows alienates not just his colleagues, including Mike Burden, but his wife, too.
11	7	"No Crying He Makes"	Mary McMurray	Paula Milne	23 December 1988
At Christmas, Wexford and Burden are called to the Kingsmarkham Hospital. A baby has been stolen from her pram and another baby left behind in her place, and it seems that the mother of the stolen child may also be in danger.

=== Series 3 (1989) ===
No. overall	No. in series	Title	Directed by	Written by	Original release date
12	1	"No More Dying Then"	Jan Sargeant	Geoffrey Case	22 October 1989
13	2	"No More Dying Then"	Jan Sargeant	Geoffrey Case	29 October 1989
14	3	"No More Dying Then"	Jan Sargeant	Geoffrey Case	5 November 1989
Wexford investigates the disappearance of John Lawrence, a five-year-old boy. After he goes missing, mad, taunting letters begin to arrive, involving another child who vanished, Stella Rivers.
15	4	"A Sleeping Life"	Bill Hays	Roger Marshall	12 November 1989
16	5	"A Sleeping Life"	Bill Hays	Roger Marshall	19 November 1989
17	6	"A Sleeping Life"	Bill Hays	Roger Marshall	26 November 1989
Wexford investigates when the dead body of a middle aged woman is found - but there are very few clues to the woman's life, let alone those that might lead to her killer.
18	7	"The Veiled One"	Mary McMurray	Trevor Preston	17 December 1989
Gwen Robson, a middle-aged housewife who may have been a blackmailer, is found garotted in the car park of a suburban shopping mall. Wexford is no sooner on the case than a car bomb goes off and all but kills him, putting him in hospital. This leaves Mike Burden with the task of solving the case, but does he go off on the wrong scent? Is Wexford's analysis any better, though?

=== Series 4 (1990) ===
No. overall	No. in series	Title	Directed by	Written by	Original release date
19	1	"Some Lie and Some Die"	Sandy Johnson	Matthew Jacobs	30 September 1990
20	2	"Some Lie and Some Die"	Sandy Johnson	Matthew Jacobs	7 October 1990
21	3	"Some Lie and Some Die"	Sandy Johnson	Matthew Jacobs	14 October 1990
The Kingsmarkham rock festival is going smoothly until the disfigured body of a local girl, thought to be living in London, is found in a nearby quarry. Wexford investigates the links between a charismatic singer and a young woman gone bad.
22	4	"The Best Man to Die"	Herbert Wise	John Brown	21 October 1990
23	5	"The Best Man to Die"	Herbert Wise	John Brown	28 October 1990
24	6	"The Best Man to Die"	Herbert Wise	John Brown	4 November 1990
Wexford joins forces with a bridegroom when his best man is killed at the stag party. And Charlie Hatton's death is only the first in a string of murders which seem to be about cheating husbands, loose women and gangsters.
25	7	"An Unkindness of Ravens"	John Gorrie	Robert Smith	11 November 1990
26	8	"An Unkindness of Ravens"	John Gorrie	Robert Smith	18 November 1990
Rodney Williams disappears and then his body is found in the woods. Wexford investigates and finds more than one mystery.
27	9	"Put on by Cunning"	Sandy Johnson	Trevor Preston	24 December 1990
When a world-famous flautist is murdered, Wexford wonders if his recently returned daughter had anything to do with it. He becomes obsessed with proving that she is an imposter, even getting permission to travel as far afield as the USA and France to do so.

=== Series 5 (1991) ===
No. overall	No. in series	Title	Directed by	Written by	Original release date
28	1	"A New Lease of Death"	Herbert Wise	Peter Berry	29 September 1991
29	2	"A New Lease of Death"	Herbert Wise	Peter Berry	6 October 1991
30	3	"A New Lease of Death"	Herbert Wise	Peter Berry	13 October 1991
Wexford's first ever successful murder case comes back to haunt him when a vicar starts to rake up the past. Was the man hanged on Wexford's evidence actually innocent?
31	4	"Murder Being Once Done"	John Gorrie	Matthew Jacobs	20 October 1991
32	5	"Murder Being Once Done"	John Gorrie	Matthew Jacobs	27 October 1991
33	6	"Murder Being Once Done"	John Gorrie	Matthew Jacobs	3 November 1991
Wexford collapses from overwork so is put on a month's leave. Instead of resting though, he decides to go and visit Mike, who is seconded to London. Although he should be resting, Wexford's dreams have drawn him towards Mike's case of a young murdered girl left lying in a vault, and a strong connection to the baby adoption business.
34	7	"From Doon with Death"	Mary McMurray	George Baker	10 November 1991
35	8	"From Doon with Death"	Mary McMurray	George Baker	17 November 1991
Margaret Parsons, a fairly ordinary housewife who, with her water board official husband Ron, has recently moved to Kingsmarkham, is found murdered in a field. Mrs. Parsons led an extremely uneventful life, being a lay preacher, but Inspector Wexford is intrigued when he is looking through her belongings and finds a number of expensive antique books all inscribed 'From Doon to Minna'. Who is Doon?
36	9	"Means of Evil"	Sarah Hellings	Peter Berry	24 November 1991
37	10	"Means of Evil"	Sarah Hellings	Peter Berry	1 December 1991
Inspector Wexford is confronted with a murder in a vegetarian family and wonders how many kinds of mushrooms there are.
38	11	"Achilles' Heel"	Sandy Johnson	Guy Hibbert	26 December 1991
When Wexford and Burden go on a holiday to France together with their wives, they meet an alluring English couple. Reg becomes transfixed by the wife, and is shocked when he gets back home to hear she has been kidnapped.

=== Series 6 (1992) ===
This was the last series to solely feature Inspector Wexford. The last episode and subsequent series shifted focus onto other characters previously featured in short stories by Rendell.

No. overall	No. in series	Title	Directed by	Written by	Original release date
39	1	"The Speaker of Mandarin"	Herbert Wise	Trevor Preston	27 September 1992
40	2	"The Speaker of Mandarin"	Herbert Wise	Trevor Preston	4 October 1992
41	3	"The Speaker of Mandarin"	Herbert Wise	Trevor Preston	11 October 1992
Having attended a police conference in China, Wexford joins a group of British tourists in Hong Kong including former barrister Adam Knighton and his wife Adela — not the most loving of couples. On return to Kingsmarkham he learns that Mrs. Knighton, who lived nearby, was murdered in an apparent robbery. Burden suspects that an ex-con with a grudge against Mr. Knighton may be responsible, but draws blanks. Wexford is convinced that the death is linked to something that happened in China and interrogates the holidaying party.
42	4	"The Mouse in the Corner"	Rob Walker	George Baker	18 October 1992
43	5	"The Mouse in the Corner"	Rob Walker	George Baker	25 October 1992
Tom Peterlee, a member of a large family who live in three adjoining cottages, is murdered. His mother Eva is, in Wexford's opinion, quite cavalier in reaction to his death, and other family members are no more helpful. Heather, his widow, seems dumb with grief, and his brother and meek sister-in-law are similarly evasive. Family friend Carol is more forthcoming, providing Heather with an alibi, but Wexford is sure that one of the Peterlees is the killer. Burden has problems of his own when his daughter starts dating a married man, and a series of ram-raids in Kingsmarkham add to Wexford's problems.
44	6	"An Unwanted Woman"	Jenny Wilkes	Rosemary Anne Sisson	1 November 1992
45	7	"An Unwanted Woman"	Jenny Wilkes	Rosemary Anne Sisson	8 November 1992
When a 92-year old lady dies, Wexford becomes suspicious that there was more to it than old age, and begins an investigation into the slightly sinister elderly retired community surrounding her.
46	8	"Kissing the Gunner's Daughter"	Mary McMurray	Matthew Jacobs	15 November 1992
47	9	"Kissing the Gunner's Daughter"	Mary McMurray	Matthew Jacobs	22 November 1992
48	10	"Kissing the Gunner's Daughter"	Mary McMurray	Matthew Jacobs	29 November 1992
49	11	"Kissing the Gunner's Daughter"	Mary McMurray	Matthew Jacobs	6 December 1992
When an off-duty DS Martin tries to be a hero during a bank robbery, not only does he get shot, but it also triggers a chain of events involving murders and deceit.
50	12	"Talking to Strange Men"	John Gorrie	Julian Bond	27 December 1992
A man's obsession with his estranged wife hits boiling point when the investigation into his sister's murder is re-opened.

=== Series 7 (1994) ===
This series was the first series not to feature Inspector Wexford, with focus being shifted to other leading characters from Rendell's repertoire of short stories. The lead role of Steven Whalby is played by Colin Firth.

No. overall	No. in series	Title	Directed by	Written by	Original release date
51	1	"Master of the Moor"	Marc Evans	Trevor Preston	2 September 1994
52	2	"Master of the Moor"	Marc Evans	Trevor Preston	9 September 1994
53	3	"Master of the Moor"	Marc Evans	Trevor Preston	16 September 1994
Part 1: An ecology writer finds himself under suspicion of murder after an artist he meets on the moors is found murdered.; Part 2: When a second body is found, the police's suspicion of Steven continues to grow, despite his psychological issues.; Part 3: A third woman is found dead, but Stephen thinks he can finally identify the suspect he saw on the moor that day.

=== Series 8 (1995) ===
No. overall	No. in series	Title	Directed by	Written by	Original release date
54	1	"Vanity Dies Hard"	Alan Grint	Julian Bond	24 March 1995
55	2	"Vanity Dies Hard"	Alan Grint	Julian Bond	31 March 1995
56	3	"Vanity Dies Hard"	Alan Grint	Julian Bond	7 April 1995
Part 1: A Florist, struggling in the recession, disappears without a trace the night before she is due to leave her house and business. She was mildly opposed to the recent marriage of her close friend Alice to Andrew Fielding.; Part 2: Further revelations about Nesta's private life begin to emerge, leading Alice to believe her friend has been murdered.; Part 3: Nesta's affair with Andrew comes to light, and Alice begins to suspect that the letters she received have been faked.
57	4	"The Strawberry Tree"	Herbert Wise	George Baker	21 April 1995
58	5	"The Strawberry Tree"	Herbert Wise	George Baker	28 April 1995
Part 1: A young housewife begins to wonder at whatever happened to her brother and cousin, who disappeared in Majorca several years ago.; Part 2: When Piers and Rosario turn up out of the blue, Petra begins to question them over their whereabouts.

=== Series 9 (1996) ===
No. overall	No. in series	Title	Directed by	Written by	Original release date
59	1	"Heartstones"	Piers Haggard	Guy Meredith	1 January 1996
A sixteen-year-old girl is angered when her father brings home a new woman shortly after her mother's death, and swears revenge.
60	2	"Simisola"	Jim Goddard	Alan Plater	26 January 1996
61	3	"Simisola"	Jim Goddard	Alan Plater	2 February 1996
62	4	"Simisola"	Jim Goddard	Alan Plater	9 February 1996
Part 1: Wexford investigates a complex case involving the disappearance of a Nigerian doctor's daughter, which is only made more complicated when the last person to see her alive is found murdered.; Part 2: Wexford arrests his burglary suspect, but a routine search of his house uncovers a body, which he suspects may be that of Dr. Akande's missing daughter.; Part 3: With his best witness still comatose, Wexford deduces that the unidentified dead girl was an abused servant, so he seeks the truth in the homes of the well-to-do.
63	5	"The Secret House of Death"	Jim Goddard	John Harvey	8 March 1996
64	6	"The Secret House of Death"	Jim Goddard	John Harvey	15 March 1996
Part 1: A divorcée, who refuses to partake of neighbourhood gossip, becomes involved with a neighbour whose wife and her lover appear to have carried out a suicide pact.; Part 2: Unaware that her neighbour Bob and widow Magdalene are the adulterers who murdered their spouses and faked the suicide pact, Susan offers Bob comfort, which he pretends to accept in order to find out how much she knows.
65	7	"A Case of Coincidence"	Gavin Millar	Geoffrey Case	22 March 1996
66	8	"A Case of Coincidence"	Gavin Millar	Geoffrey Case	29 March 1996
Part 1: After four attractive women are found strangled in and around the local river, the free-spirited wife of a London doctor is killed while on an extramarital assignation.; Part 2: The investigation leads to Eddie Brannel, a mentally handicapped childhood friend of Sara's, and although he admits to the other killings, he denies killing her.

=== Series 10 (1997) ===
No. overall	No. in series	Title	Directed by	Written by	Original release date
67	1	"The Double"	Mary McMurray	Piers Haggard	3 January 1997
Two identical women, one virginal and touch-me-not and the other sexy and seductive, vie for the affections of a young stockbroker.
68	2	"A Dark Blue Perfume"	Sandy Johnson	Peter Ransley	10 January 1997
A middle-aged man is still haunted by a love affair from his youth which almost ended in murder.
69	3	"Bribery and Corruption"	Mike Vardy	Guy Meredith	17 January 1997
70	4	"Bribery and Corruption"	Mike Vardy	Guy Meredith	24 January 1997
Part 1: Nick, a recent college graduate, believes he loves Emma, the wife of his father's former friend, but Nick does not know that she's been having an affair with his father. Emma is then murdered.; Part 2: The police make Nick's father their prime suspect in Emma's murder, and he makes a suicide attempt, ending up in a coma. Nick and Annabel conduct their own investigation.
71	5	"Thornapple"	Mary McMurray	Roy MacGregor	31 January 1997
A 12-year-old boy is dazzled when his older cousin comes to stay, but is suspicious when her aunt unexpectedly dies and leaves her a large sum of money in her will.
72	6	"May and June"	James Cellan Jones	Ken Blakeson	7 February 1997
73	7	"May and June"	James Cellan Jones	Ken Blakeson	14 February 1997
Part 1: After a lifetime of sibling rivalry, in which their father favoured the clever and pretty June, May attends her brother-in-law's funeral. Many years before, May attempted suicide when June took May's fiancé.; Part 2: After accepting her sister's offer of reconciliation, May realises June had been having an affair whilst her husband was alive. She grows close to this man, John, and tells him about what happened.
74	8	"Front Seat"	Sandy Johnson	Alex Ferguson	21 February 1997
When Cecily Branksome retires back to her home town over her husband's objections, she becomes involved with her boorish old boyfriend and a 30-year-old murder.

=== Series 11 (1998) ===
No. overall	No. in series	Title	Directed by	Written by	Original release date	Viewers (millions)
75	1	"Going Wrong"	Matthew Evans	Julian Bond	2 June 1998	N/A
76	2	"Going Wrong"	Matthew Evans	Julian Bond	9 June 1998	N/A
77	3	"Going Wrong"	Matthew Evans	Julian Bond	11 June 1998	N/A
Part 1: A successful businessman runs into his old girlfriend. Although she treats him politely, his rekindled feelings to her border on nothing less than obsession.; Part 2: Guy's obsession with his old girlfriend Leonora grows and he becomes convinced that someone close to her is poisoning her against him.; Part 3: Invited to Leonora and William's for dinner, Guy goes mad when he learns that they will be moving to Manchester and attacks William.
78	4	"Road Rage"	Bruce McDonald	George Baker	8 November 1998	10.51
79	5	"Road Rage"	Bruce McDonald	George Baker	9 November 1998	9.06
Part 1: Wexford investigates when a young German girl mysteriously disappears from outside a pub, and a group of environmentalist stage a sit in to prevent a bypass from being built through a forest.; Part 2: Wexford's wife Dora is released by the terrorists, but young Roxanne is found dead, and young Ryan has apparently defected to the terrorists.
80	6	"You Can't Be Too Careful"	Matthew Evans	Ted Whitehead	24 December 1998	5.81
Prim businesswoman Della Galway has a compulsive penchant for double-locking doors - but her new roommate is careless about security.
81	7	"The Orchard Walls"	Gwennan Sage	Jacqueline Holborough	31 December 1998	6.30
A bright young teenage girl is 'farmed out' to relatives in the rural West Country during the Battle of Britain, and makes many astute observations about life there.

=== Series 12 (1999—2000) ===
No. overall	No. in series	Title	Directed by	Written by	Original release date	Viewers (millions)
82	1	"The Lake of Darkness"	Bruce MacDonald	Peter J. Hammond	3 May 1999	7.33
Quiet accountant Martin wins the lottery, but things take a turn for the worse when he meets Francesca, who is not what she seems.
83	2	"The Fallen Curtain"	Matthew Evans	Douglas Livingstone	6 August 1999	6.66
Richard Brazier has a mental block about his abduction as an eight-year-old and is haunted by what may or may not have happened.
84	3	"Harm Done"	Bruce MacDonald	Christopher Russell	11 October 2000	9.78
Wexford copes with two abductions of teen-aged girls, the disappearance of a three-year-old from her bedroom, and the return of a paroled paedophile to the town.

== Media releases ==
The first six series were released on VHS on 21 January 2000 via IMC Vision. This was shortly before the rights to Television South's back-catalogue were purchased by The Walt Disney Company during their purchase of Fox Family Worldwide in 2001, which has subsequently led to all other TVS programmes being unavailable for commercial release on VHS or DVD.

Subsequently, the remaining six series were released on DVD on 9 April 2007, as The Best Of Ruth Rendell Mysteries, via Network. As these series were not produced by TVS, the licensing rights became available for a DVD release. However, four episodes were omitted ("Heartstones", "The Strawberry Tree", "Thornapple" and "Talking to Strange Men"), none of which have ever been commercially released. Again, the remaining six series were released on DVD in the United States on 24 June 2008. Series seven-twelve have since been repeated on ITV3 and ITV Encore, however, once again the four episodes omitted from the DVD were not broadcast, suggesting that the licensing rights for these episodes are no longer available.

As of March 2026, 5 dvds of Wexford episodes have been released by German company Pidax containing Series 1 - 6. Some episodes have full credits and some don't. Both sets are under the title Inspektor Wexford Ermittelt.

Episodes included on the first two box sets include A Guilty Thing Surprised, Shake Hands Forever, No Crying He Makes, Some Lie And Some Die and The Best Man To Die on volume 1, with Murder Being Once Done, Achilles Heel, The House In The Corner and Kissing The Gunners Daughter parts 1 & 2 on volume 2. You can buy these on a few different websites including Amazon.

The only episode not released is Series 6's The Speaker of Mandarin.

Series	Year	# of episodes	Format	Release dates	Notes
Series 1	1987	4	2 x VHS; DVD	21 January 2000	Never released on DVD in the UK due to issues with Television South licensing rights. Released on DVD for the first time in Germany in January 2026.
Series 2	1988	7	3 x VHS; DVD	21 January 2000; 30 May 2016	Never released on DVD in the UK due to issue with Television South licensing rights. Released on DVD for the first time in Germany in May 2016. Two of the three stories ("A Guilty Thing Surprised" and "Shake Hands Forever") were heavily cut for the DVD, each story losing around 45 minutes against the original broadcast version.
Series 3	1989	7	3 x VHS; DVD	21 January 2000	Never released on DVD due to issues with Television South licensing rights. Released on DVD for the first time in Germany in November 2025.
Series 4	1990	9	4 x VHS; DVD	21 January 2000; 30 May 2016	Never released on DVD in the UK due to issue with Television South licensing rights. "Some Lie and Some Die" and "The Best Man to Die" released on DVD for the first time in Germany in May 2016. "An Unkindness of Ravens" and "Put On by Cunning" released on DVD for the first time in Germany in November 2025. Both stories were heavily cut for the DVD, each losing over 41 minutes against the original broadcast version.
Series 5	1991	11	5 x VHS; DVD	21 January 2000; 30 May 2016	Never released on DVD in the UK due to issue with Television South licensing rights. "Murder Being Once Done" and "Achilles Heel" released on DVD for the first time in Germany in May 2016. The story "Murder Being Once Done" was heavily cut for the DVD, losing around 42 minutes against the original broadcast version.
Series 6	1992	11	4 x VHS; DVD	21 January 2000; 30 May 2016	Never released on DVD in the UK due to issue with Television South licensing rights. "The Mouse in the Corner" and "Kissing the Gunner's Daughter" released on DVD for the first time in Germany in May 2016.
Series 7	1992-1994	4	DVD	9 April 2007	Episode 1, "Talking to Strange Men", is not included in the UK set but was commercially released in March 2026 through Pidax in Germany.
Series 8	1995	5	DVD	9 April 2007	Episodes 4-5, "The Strawberry Tree", are not included in this set and has never been commercially released.
Series 9	1996	8	DVD	9 April 2007	Episode 1, "Heartstones", is not included in the UK sert but was commercially released in March 2026 through Pidax in Germany.
Series 10	1997	8	DVD	9 April 2007	Episode 5, "Thornapple", is not included in this set and has never been commercially released.
Series 11	1998	7	DVD	9 April 2007	Includes all seven episodes.
Series 12	1999-2000	3	DVD	9 April 2007	Includes all three episodes.
