= Louie Ramsay =

British actress (1929–2011)

Louie Ramsay (25 November 1929 – 6 March 2011) was a British actress perhaps best known to television audiences for her portrayal of the wife of Chief Inspector Reg Wexford on the ITV television series Ruth Rendell Mysteries. In real life, Ramsay married the man who played Reg Wexford in the series, actor George Baker.

Ramsay was born to Scottish parents in South Africa in 1929, but was raised in London. Her father Melvin Ramsay was a physician known for his work on ME/CFS. She was educated at the North London Collegiate School. She became friends with Patricia Hitchcock, daughter of film director Alfred Hitchcock, who cast her in a small role in his 1950 film Stage Fright. Ramsay made her West End debut in 1951 as a member of the chorus line in the musical South Pacific.

She was the subject of This Is Your Life in 1958 when she was surprised by Eamonn Andrews at the King's Theatre, Edinburgh.

In the 1970s, Ramsay acted at Laurence Olivier's National Theatre, in Peter Shaffer's Equus, The Misanthrope, with Alec McCowen and Diana Rigg, and as Joan Plowright's sister in Olivier's acclaimed production of JB Priestley's Eden End. On the first night of Eden End, taking a curtain call with Olivier and Priestley himself, she said to herself quietly: "Lou, I think you've just peaked."

Ramsay died on 6 March 2011, aged 81.
