= Graded exercise therapy =

Treatment method for addressing fatigue

- Other names: GET
- Specialty: Physical therapy

Graded exercise therapy (GET) is a programme of physical activity that starts very slowly and gradually increases over time, intended as a treatment for myalgic encephalomyelitis/chronic fatigue syndrome (ME/CFS). Most public health bodies, including the CDC and NICE, consider it ineffective, and its safety is disputed. However, GET still enjoys support from a minority of clinicians and organizations.

== Description ==
A graded exercise programme starts with a physiotherapist or exercise physiologist assessing the patient's current abilities and negotiating goals. The patient then begins exercising at a level within their capabilities. The patient and therapist increase the duration of sessions, typically by 10-20% every 1-2 weeks, until they can perform 30 minutes of light exercise five times a week. Then the intensity is raised if desired.

The exercise can be any activity that can be titrated, such as walking, jogging, swimming, using exercise machines, and these may be mixed to add variety. Increasing the intensity can be more challenging than increasing duration, and a heart rate monitor may be employed to track intensity. If exercise exacerbates a patient's symptoms, they may be encouraged to pause the increases until symptoms become manageable again. In other cases, the patient is expected to continue fixed increases in activity regardless of the degree of post-exertional malaise they experience.

Patients are told that if exercise provokes symptoms, it is a typical response to becoming more active rather than a pathological process that causes permanent damage. Adverse effects may be increased if the practitioner is unfamiliar with CFS or exercise is not ramped up appropriately.

== Model ==
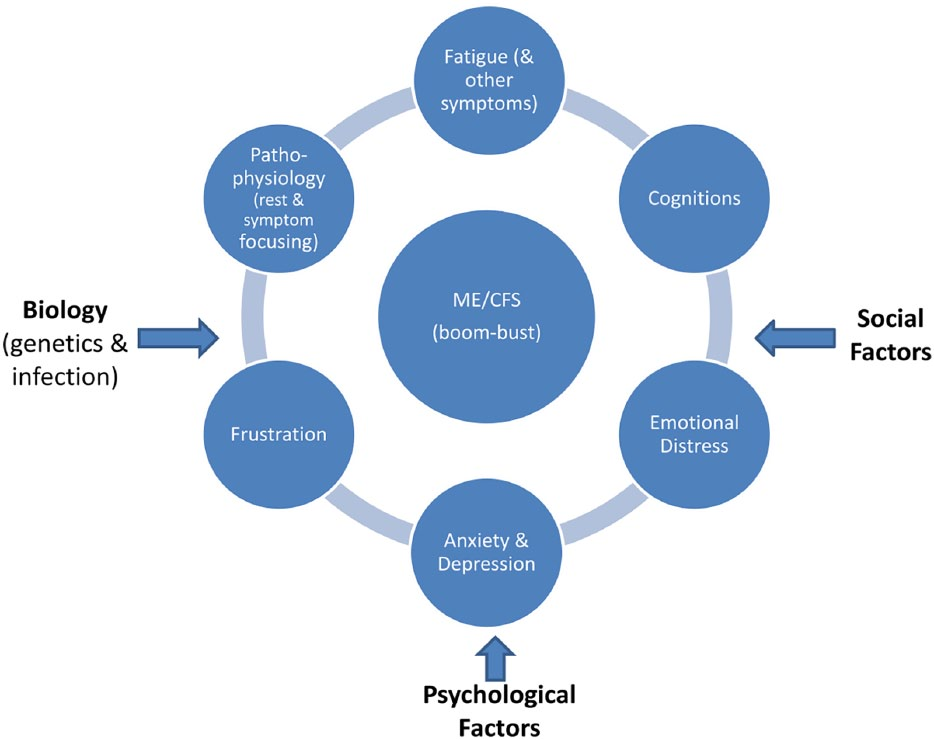
The disputed cognitive-behvioral model that underlies graded exercise

GET is based on the discredited model that people with ME/CFS avoid exerting themselves due to fear of triggering symptoms such as pain and fatigue, which causes deconditioning and further worsening of symptoms. Excessive focus on symptoms and attributing illness to biological factors are also said perpetuate the illness.

This model lacks evidence, contradicts patient experience, and fails to account for the biological evidence that ME/CFS is a serious medical condition. Further, mental health problems or deconditioning do not cause ME/CFS.

== Effectiveness ==
Graded exercise therapy is generally considered to be an ineffective, outdated standard of care that can worsen the condition. GET does not enable patients to increase their activity levels (as objectively measured by actigraphy) or return to work.

Major public health bodies recommend against GET. The CDC stopped recommending GET in 2017, and says that people with ME/CFS do not tolerate vigorous exercise. NICE's 2021 guidance for ME/CFS removed graded exercise, which was recommended in the previous 2007 version, and cautions against "any programme that...uses fixed incremental increases in physical activity or exercise, for example, graded exercise therapy." According to NICE, studies of GET have been of poor or very poor quality.

Two regional departments of health, in New York state and Victoria, Australia, say GET is ineffective and potentially dangerous. The Mayo Clinic consensus recommendations for the treatment of ME/CFS also oppose GET.

ME/CFS patient organizations strongly oppose GET because they disagree that mental health problems are a cause of their illness and because many patients anecdotally report harms due to GET.

As of 2015, the Royal Australian College of General Practitioners still supported graded exercise for CFS.

== Research ==
Outcomes reported by the PACE trial

The available research into GET is of poor or very poor quality. These studies generally have limited tracking of adverse effects, employ outdated definitions of ME/CFS that do not require post-exertional malaise, and rely on subjective self-reported outcome measures within unblinded trials, making them prone to placebo effects.

The largest study on GET, the 2011 PACE trial, reported that GET and cognitive-behavioral therapy were safe and resulted in recovery for 22% of participants and improvement for 60%. There has since been considerable debate over the validity of the results. Outcome measures were modified mid-trial without a clear rationale. When the data were reanalyzed utilising the original protocol, the rate of improvement was only 21%, and recovery was just 4%. While trial participants reported subjective improvement, there was no clinically significant improvement in fitness according to the 6-minute walk test, an objective outcome.

A 2022 review commissioned by the CDC concluded that weak evidence suggests that GET has "small to moderate" benefits, including reduced fatigue, decreased depression and anxiety, and better sleep. It said these results are of uncertain relevance to people with severe ME/CFS, a diagnosis according to modern criteria, or post-exertional malaise. According to the review, limited evidence suggests that GET is not harmful, but that reporting of harms was "suboptimal."

A 2019 Cochrane review of 8 studies concluded that GET "probably" reduces fatigue but that evidence on long-term effectiveness and potential harms are very limited. The studies analyzed employed older definitions of CFS, so the effects on current patient cohorts may be different. An independent analysis of the same studies reached the opposite conclusion based on the unreliability of subjective outcomes in unblinded trials, lack of objective improvements in physical fitness and employment, and insufficient tracking of adverse events.

The ME Association asserts that GET causes a significant fraction of patients to get worse: 30% to 50% in self-reported patient questionnaires. According to the Mayo Clinic Proceedings recommendations, 54% to 74% reported harm.

Graded exercise therapy has also been trialled in long COVID; a retrospective study showed adherence predicted outcomes, implying some utility of GET in this patient group.
