= Michael Sharpe (psychiatrist) =

British psychiatrist

Michael Sharpe is a British psychiatrist and academic, specialising in the psychiatric aspects of medical illness. He is an emeritus Professor of Psychological Medicine at the University of Oxford and a Fellow of Saint Cross College, Oxford. From 1997 to 2011, he was Professor of Psychological Medicine at the University of Edinburgh. Sharpe was the elected President of the European Association of Psychosomatic Medicine for 2022–2023.

== Work ==
While a professor at Oxford, Sharpe ran a research programme to develop and evaluate psychiatric treatments for medically ill patients.

Sharpe has worked on the CFS/ME for years, and is perhaps best known as a co-author on the controversial PACE trial. He, like CFS researcher Simon Wessely, has since then withdrawn from CFS/ME research, saying the climate had become “too toxic” because of online abuse from some patients who reject his claims that CFS/ME is a mental illness.

In 2021 he controversially gave a presentation on secondary COVID-19 impacts to Swiss Re in which he suggested that Long COVID was partly caused by psychological and social factors such as reportage by the Guardian columnist George Monbiot.

Sharpe's recent work is on depression in people with cancer and the mental health of elderly inpatients.

== Honours ==
In 2009, he was named Psychiatric Academic of the Year by the Royal College of Psychiatrists. In 2014, he was named Psychiatrist of the Year by the Royal College of Psychiatrists.
