= Solve ME/CFS Initiative =

U.S. nonprofit organization

- Abbreviation: SMCI, CFIDS
- Predecessor: Chronic Fatigue Immune Dysfunction Syndrome (CFIDS) Association of America
- Formation: 1987
- Type: NGO
- Legal status: Charity
- Location: Los Angeles, California, United States
- President and CEO: Oved Amitay
- Vice President of Advocacy and Engagement: Emily Taylor
- Medical Advisor: David Hardy
- Staff: 10 (2020)
- Website: solvecfs.org

The Solve ME/CFS Initiative (Solve M.E.) is an American nonprofit that does research and advocacy for myalgic encephalomyelitis/chronic fatigue syndrome (ME/CFS), Long COVID, and other post-infectious diseases. Their stated mission is to assist research into ways to diagnose, treat, or cure these conditions. They also advocate for increased awareness, public funding of research, and access to medical care for patients.

== History ==
Solve M.E. was founded in 1987 as the Chronic Fatigue Immune Dysfunction Syndrome (CFIDS) Association of America, and changed to its current name in the spring of 2014. Oved Amitay was named president and chief executive officer on June 1, 2020. He was preceded by Carol Head, who was CEO and President from 2013 to 2019. The chair of the board of directors is John Nicols.

== Activities ==
Solve M.E. funds research through their Ramsay Research Grant program, whose stated aims are to attract new researchers and fund pilot studies that could lead to researchers getting funding from other sources. They maintain a biobank called the You + M.E. Registry, which stores blood samples and self-reported data from people with ME/CFS, people with long COVID, and healthy controls. They perform advocacy activities, such as contacting elected officials, and publishing materials for patients. They are a member of the DecodeME, a genetic study of ME/CFS, and the Long COVID Alliance, an advocacy organization for long COVID.
