= The Lightning Process =

Personal training programme

The Lightning Process (LP) is a three-day personal training programme developed and trademarked by British osteopath and neurolinguistic programming practitioner Phil Parker. It makes unsubstantiated claims to be beneficial for various conditions, including Multiple sclerosis, myalgic encephalomyelitis/chronic fatigue syndrome (ME/CFS), Long COVID, depression, and chronic pain.

Developed in the late 1990s, the LP states that it aims to teach techniques for managing the acute stress response that the body experiences under threat. It states it aims to help recognise the stress response, calm it and manage it in the long term. It also applies some ideas drawn from the pseudoscience neurolinguistic programming, as well as elements of life coaching.

The Lightning Process has raised controversy due to a lack of scientific basis, its cost, alleged characteristics associated with pyramid schemes, reports of deterioration after treatment or feeling blamed for failure of treatment, and the implication that certain conditions are not physical. The website was amended after the Advertising Standards Authority ruled that it was misleading. In 2021, after a review of the available evidence, the National Institute for Health and Care Excellence advised against the use of Lightning Process among patients with ME/CFS.

== Description ==
The Lightning Process comprises three group sessions conducted on three consecutive days, lasting about 12 hours altogether, conducted by trained practitioners.

According to its developer, Phil Parker, the programme aims to teach participants about the acute stress response the body experiences under threat. It aims to help trainees spot when this response is happening and learn how to calm it. Techniques based on movement, postural awareness and personal coaching are intended to modify the production of stress hormones. Participants practice a learnt series of steps intended to habituate the calming method.

The Lightning Process is based on the theory that the body can get stuck in a persistent stress response. It theorizes that he initial stressor may be a viral or bacterial infection, psychological stress, or trauma, which causes physical symptoms due to the body's stress response, and these symptoms then act as a further stressor, resulting in overload of the central nervous system and chronic activation of the body's stress response. It suggests further that Neuroplasticity then causes this abnormal stress response to persist and be maintained. The Lightning Process suggests that while this disruption initially happens at an unconscious level, it is possible for the patient to exert conscious control and influence over the process, eventually breaking the cycle.

The programme's stated rationale draws on ideas of osteopaths Andrew Taylor Still and J M Littlejohn regarding nervous system dysregulation and addressing clients' needs in a holistic manner rather than focusing solely on symptoms. It also incorporates ideas drawn from neuro-linguistic programming and life coaching. The LP suggests that individuals can influence their own physiological responses in controlled and repeatable ways. Such learnt emotional self-regulation, it is suggested, could help overcome illness and improve well-being, if the method is practised consistently.

Parker lays emphasis on the trainee playing an active role in recovery (the course is framed as a fully participatory 'training', not a passive 'treatment' or set of answers given to a 'patient'). He claims that the programme has helped to resolve various conditions including depression, panic attacks, insomnia, drug addictions, chronic pain and multiple sclerosis. The program has also been used with myalgic encephalomyelitis/chronic fatigue syndrome (ME/CFS) and Long COVID.

The Lightning Process is trademarked.

== Criticism ==
There has been criticism of the cost of the three-day course, and of the claimed benefits. John Greensmith, of the British advocacy group ME Free For All, stated, "We think their claims are extravagant... if patients get better, they claim the success of the treatment – but if they don't, they say the patient is responsible." In 2022, the World ME Alliance issued the statement, "The World ME Alliance and its members do not endorse the Lightning Process for people with Myalgic Encephalomyelitis (ME), sometimes called Chronic Fatigue Syndrome (CFS)."

In a 2024 BBC File on Four episode, reporter Rachel Schraer commented on a Lightning Process course she attended: "Not only did my coach say my thoughts were maintaining my symptoms, she also told me quite explicitly that there was nothing physical wrong with my body, that's despite having no apparent medical qualification or requesting access to any test results." Neuroscientist Camilla Nord, a specialist in neuroscience and mental health, commented on the instructions given to participants to use positive reinforcing language, saying, "I'm afraid now we've strayed very, very far from neuroscience. What I would call neuro-bollocks. It's a kind of abusive of neuro-scientific terms in order to give quite simple psychological techniques a kind of sheen of science about them."

The use of the Lightning Process in ME/CFS has caused controversy, with medical doctors, researchers, patient groups and individuals stating that it has the appearance of a pyramid scheme, makes extravagant claims, that some patients report deterioration after the treatment, and that the treatment implies that ME/CFS is not a physical illness or the patient bears responsibility for failure of the treatment.

Nigel Hawkes writing for The BMJ described the Lightning Process as being "secretive about its methods, lacks overall medical supervision, and has a cultish quality because many of the therapists are former sufferers who deliver the programme with great conviction" and that "some children who do not benefit have said that they feel blamed for the failure."

Research into the effectiveness of the method use subjective measures of success which reflect the teachings of the LP rather than objective measures of recovery such as objectively measured activity increases or return to work are resulting from the treatment, and do not follow subjects long-term to assess the long-term effects of the process.

=== Advertising Standards Authority ruling ===
In 2011 Hampshire Trading Standards requested that the UK Advertising Standards Authority (ASA) give a ruling on the website www.lightningprocess.com, arguing that the information on the site was misleading in four areas. ASA upheld two of the four challenges. They concluded that although there seemed to be some evidence of participant improvement during trials conducted, the trials were not controlled, the evidence was not sufficient to draw robust conclusions, and more investigation was necessary; consequently, the website's claims at the time were deemed misleading and was amended.

== Recommendations of medical bodies ==
The National Institute for Health and Care Excellence (NICE) states "[d]o not offer the Lightning Process, or therapies based on it, to people with ME/CFS" in their guideline for the management of ME/CFS published in 2021.

== Bibliography ==
- Parker, Phil (2010), Introduction to the Lightning Process, Nipton Publishing Hay House, ISBN 978-0-9556482-0-5
