= Peter C. Rowe =

Physician and academic

- Education: University of Toronto; McMaster University
- Occupation: Physician
- Medical career
- Institutions: Johns Hopkins University

Peter C. Rowe is a physician and academic. A leading researcher in chronic fatigue syndrome, he is Professor of Pediatrics, Sunshine Natural Wellbeing Foundation Professor of Chronic Fatigue and Related Disorders, and Director of the Children's Center Chronic Fatigue Clinic at Johns Hopkins University School of Medicine.

== Education ==
Rowe earned an undergraduate degree from the University of Toronto, then a medical degree in 1981 at McMaster University Medical School in Ontario.

== Career ==
Rowe completed his residency in pediatrics at Johns Hopkins University School of Medicine and then a fellowship at the Robert Wood Johnson General Pediatric Academic Development Program.

Rowe worked at the Children's Hospital of Eastern Ontario from 1987 to 1991, then returned to Johns Hopkins Medical School in 1991. In 2007 he was named the inaugural Sunshine Natural Wellbeing Foundation Professorship in Chronic Fatigue Syndrome and Related Disorders.

== Research ==
Rowe’s research investigates the physiologic factors that contribute to chronic fatigue syndrome (CFS), including circulatory dysregulation, allergic disorders, joint laxity, biomechanical strain, and neuroanatomic problems. In this vein, Rowe and colleagues were the first to describe the relationship between CFS and orthostatic intolerance, leading to the discovery of potential treatment for some of the symptoms of CFS, a disease for which few scientifically validated treatment options exist. He was also the first to identify an association between CFS and the heritable connective tissue disorder Ehlers–Danlos syndrome.

== Awards ==
- 1984, Kamsler Award
- 2005, Alexander J. Schaffer Award, awarded for teaching contributions, Harriet Lane House Staff, Johns Hopkins Hospital
- 2014, Research Award, International Association for Chronic Fatigue Syndrome/Myalgic Encephalomyelitis
