= SF-36 =

Survey of patient health

The Short Form (36) Health Survey is a 36-item, patient-reported survey of patient health. The SF-36 is a measure of health status and an abbreviated variant of it, the SF-6D, is commonly used in health economics as a variable in the quality-adjusted life year calculation to determine the cost-effectiveness of a health treatment. The SF-36 is also commonly utilized in health psychology research to examine the burden of disease. The original SF-36 stemmed from the Medical Outcome Study, MOS, which was conducted by the RAND Corporation. Since then a group of researchers from the original study released a commercial version of SF-36 while the original SF-36 is available in public domain license free from RAND. A shorter version is the SF-12, which contains 12 items rather than 36. If having only adequate physical and mental health summary scores is of interest, "then the SF12 may be the instrument of choice".

== Difference between the SF-36 and the RAND-36 ==
The SF-36 and RAND-36 include the same set of items that were developed in the Medical Outcomes Study. Scoring of the general health and pain scales is different between the versions. The differences in scoring are summarized by Hays, Sherbourne, and Mazel.

== Scoring ==
The SF-36 consists of eight scaled scores, which are the weighted sums of the questions in their section. Each scale is directly transformed into a 0-100 scale on the assumption that each question carries equal weight. The lower the score the more disability. The higher the score the less disability i.e., a score of zero is equivalent to maximum disability and a score of 100 is equivalent to no disability. To calculate the scores it is necessary to purchase special software for the commercial version, but no special software is needed for the RAND-36 version. Pricing depends on the number of scores that the researcher needs to calculate.

The eight sections are:

- vitality
- physical functioning
- bodily pain
- general health perceptions
- physical role functioning
- emotional role functioning
- social role functioning
- mental health or emotional wellbeing

Instructions for converting the individual scores into z-scores and to provide standardised combined scores (mean 50, standard deviation 10) for several populations (Australian women, combined or in three different age groups, also the general Australian and US population - for example younger people have better physical score averages) are on the website of the Australian Longitudinal Study of Women's Health. SAS code is provided as well.

An interesting point of the document is that physical health scores are counted negatively when calculating combined mental health scores and vice versa. In other words, to score highly on mental health it is better to have worse physical health and vice versa. This is the result of the negative weights that resulted from the principal component analysis used. If you have perfect physical and mental health, your scores are on a 50 mean / 10 standard deviation scale: 56.5 for physical health and 62.5 for mental health if you use the Australian population numbers in the ALSWH document. If you have perfect physical but the worst mental health your physical health score is 61.6 and for the opposite your mental health score is 66.2.

== Uses ==
- Evaluating individual patients health status
- Researching the cost-effectiveness of a treatment
- Monitoring and comparing disease burden

== Limitations ==
- The survey does not take into consideration a sleep variable
- The survey has a low response rate in the >65 population though not always.
- Concerns around cross-cultural validity and conceptual equivalence of items have been raised.
