= Chronotropic incompetence =

Blunted heart rate response

- Other names: Chronotropic intolerance
- Symptoms: Exercise intolerance
- Diagnostic method: Cardiopulmonary exercise test
- Prevalence: 50% among people with heart failure

Chronotropic incompetence (CI) is the inability of heart rate to increase as expected in response to exercise. The condition can be defined in different ways and occurs in various diseases. Sufferers have a higher risk of cardiovascular disease and early death.

== Definition ==
In healthy people, cardiac output during exercise increases via a rise in both heart rate and stroke volume. When the heart rate does not rise sufficiently, this can lead to exercise intolerance. CI can be detected using a cardiopulmonary exercise test. People with CI have a higher risk of cardiovascular disease and early death.

There are different ways to define CI. One common threshold is not being able to reach 80% of age-predicted maximal heart rate (APMHR), which is said to be 220 – age. Another definition is not being able to reach 80% of the expected heart rate reserve, that is, the difference between the individual's resting heart rate and APMHR.

== Incidence ==
Chronotropic incompetence occurs in various diseases. Roughly half of people with heart failure experience it, compared to less than 9% of age-matched healthy controls. When CI occurs alongside issues with stroke volume, it can lead to a strong decrease in functional ability. It is associated with the activation of the sympathetic nervous system (part of the fight-or-flight response), leading to higher levels of norepinephrine. CI in people with heart failure can further be related to the use of β-blockers, a high resting heart rate or the downregulation of β-adrenergic receptors.

CI is also observed in people with obstructive sleep apnea. Similarly to CI in heart failure, it is possibly linked to the autonomic nervous system shift towards the sympathetic nervous system. People with type-2 diabetes often experience CI too, as do some people with long COVID. People with myalgic encephalomyelitis/chronic fatigue syndrome (ME/CFS) also experience a blunted heart rate response to exercise. CI in ME/CFS is most evident on the second day of a repeated exercise test, after the first exercise test induces post-exertional malaise.
