= Small heart syndrome =

- Other names: Small heart; Neurocirculatory asthenia
- Specialty: Cardiology

Small heart syndrome is a cardiovascular condition in which the heart is small and cardiac output is low. It has been defined as a small heart shadow on chest roentgenogram and more specifically as a cardiothoracic ratio (CTR) of less than or equal to 42%. It has been hypothesized that a small heart in relation to body size may be inadequate for work and that the condition may result in cerebral hypoperfusion, orthostatic intolerance, and exaggerated sympathetic activation. This in turn may result in a variety of symptoms including malaise, weakness, fatigue, tachycardia, heart palpitations, low blood pressure, chest pain, dizziness, shortness of breath, nervousness, trembling, sweating, fainting, and cold feet, among others.

The symptoms of small heart syndrome show some parallels to those of chronic heart failure and resemble the symptoms of myalgic encephalomyelitis/chronic fatigue syndrome (ME/CFS). Small heart syndrome is known to be present at high rates in people with ME/CFS. General cardiovascular findings in these individuals have included small hearts, left ventricular dysfunction, poor cardiac performance, low stroke volume, low cardiac output, low total blood volume, low blood pressure, cerebral hypoperfusion, and heart rate abnormalities. Exaggerated diurnal variation in blood pressure has also been observed, and diurnal blood pressure variation has been found to correlate with fatigue severity. In addition to ME/CFS, people with postural orthostatic tachycardia syndrome (POTS) frequently show small hearts. ME/CFS and POTS additionally co-occur at high rates. Small heart syndrome has been associated with symptoms and their severity in people with ME/CFS.

Dehydration, for instance due to inadequate fluid intake, diarrhea, or sweating, may worsen symptoms of small heart syndrome due to reduced venous return and cardiac output. Relatedly, adequate hydration in people with ME/CFS may be beneficial. Habitual exercise may improve cardiac and pulmonary conditioning, increase cardiac output, and thereby improve symptoms in the condition. Treatments like antihypotensive agents such as the α_{1}-adrenergic receptor agonist phenylephrine and medications to increase fluid retention and thus blood volume like the mineralocorticoid fludrocortisone may be helpful in small heart syndrome. Compression stockings may increase venous return and improve symptoms as well.

Small heart syndrome in for instance ME/CFS may in part be related to physical inactivity, prolonged bed rest, and associated cardiac deconditioning. Alternatively, cardiovascular dysfunction and other symptoms in ME/CFS may not be due to deconditioning and may instead be related to autonomic dysfunction, for example caused by viral infection. However, even if not a major cause, small heart syndrome may still contribute to symptom burden in ME/CFS. There is said to be no organic heart disease or systemic disease in small heart syndrome. Small heart syndrome due to anorexia nervosa has been reported and may also occur in other situations such as cancer-induced cachexia.

The concept of small heart syndrome was first described by René Laennec in 1826. Subsequently, Commander A. M. Master described small heart as the cause of a condition he referred to as "neurocirculatory asthenia", considered to be synonymous with small heart syndrome, in 1944. Kunihisa Miwa and colleagues described small heart syndrome as a possible cause or contributor to ME/CFS in 2008 and thereafter. Small heart syndrome as a contributor to ME/CFS has also since been studied by Julia Newton and colleagues.

== See also ==
- Sedentary lifestyle
- Deconditioning
- Effect of spaceflight on the human body
