= CPET =

CPET may refer to:

- Cardiopulmonary exercise test, a cardiological test that measures the heart's ability to respond to external stress
- Concerted proton-electron transfer
