= Post-exertional malaise =

Worsening of symptoms with activity

- Other names: Post-exertional symptom exacerbation (PESE), post-exertional neuroimmune exhaustion (PENE)
- Chart of physical, cognitive, and emotional activities that may trigger PEM
- Symptoms: Delayed symptoms after exertion: cognitive issues, pain, fatigue, weakness and flu-like symptoms like a sore throat
- Prevention: Pacing (staying within the energy envelope)
- Management: Rest
- Frequency: Required for a diagnosis of ME/CFS; 55% in people with long COVID

Post-exertional malaise (PEM) is a worsening of existing symptoms or appearance of new symptoms that occurs after even minimal exertion. It is the hallmark symptom of myalgic encephalomyelitis/chronic fatigue syndrome (ME/CFS) and is a symptom for about half of people with long COVID.

PEM is often severe enough to be disabling, and is triggered by ordinary activities that individuals tolerated before their illness. Typically, it begins 12–48 hours after the activity that triggers it, and lasts for days, but this is highly variable and may persist much longer. Example triggers are taking a shower or holding a conversation. It can be assessed by a questionnaire, and in research settings, measured with a 2-day cardiopulmonary exercise test.

Individuals are recommended to pace their activities to stay within their individual energy limits to avoid triggering PEM. During a crash, management involves a further reduction in activity levels and rest. The use of assistive technologies can help people maintain their independence.

== History and terminology ==
Melvin Ramsay, the infectious diseases specialist who was the first to create a case definition for myalgic encephalomyelitis, described the symptom in his 1988 book:

Muscle fatigability whereby, even after a minor degree of physical effort, three, four or five days or longer elapse before full muscle power is restored is unique and constitutes the sheet anchor of diagnosis. Without it I would be unwilling to diagnose a patient as suffering from ME.

Later definitions of PEM broadened the concept to include mental exertion in addition to physical exertion.

The term "post-exertional malaise" itself was mentioned in a 1991 review summarizing the symptoms of ME/CFS. The International Consensus Criteria, published in 2011, used the term post-exertional neuroimmune exhaustion, as they considered the term 'malaise' to be overly vague. Similarly, the 2021 NICE committee stated they consider the term PEM outdated, as it may give the impression of just a 'vague discomfort' (malaise), and argued that the term post-exertional symptom exacerbation better captures the phenomenon. Nonetheless, they decided to continue using PEM as it is the more familiar term.

People experiencing PEM often describe it as a "crash", "collapse", or "setback". A longer period of symptom exacerbation is called a relapse. A flare-up can also occur without a clear trigger.

== Description ==
=== Triggers ===
PEM can be triggered by minimal physical or mental activities that were previously tolerated. There is a wide range of triggers that can cause PEM:

- physical triggers like taking a shower, getting groceries, or working
- environmental triggers like heat or cold
- cognitive or social triggers like holding a conversation, or going to a school event

In addition to these triggers, sensory overload, emotional distress, injury, sleep deprivation, and infections are other potential triggers. The resulting symptoms are disproportionate to the triggering activity and are often debilitating, potentially rendering someone who is able to leave the house at baseline housebound, or someone who is able to leave the bed at baseline bedbound.

=== Timeline ===
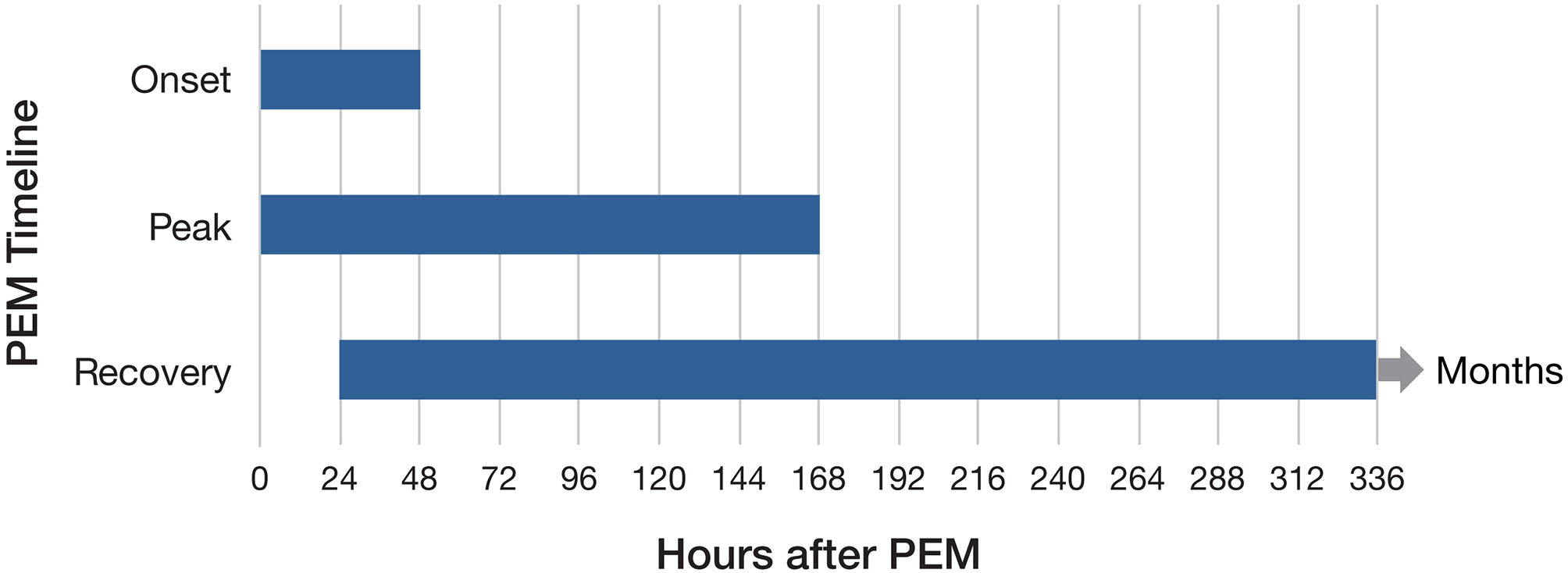
Typical timeframes of post-exertional malaise after normal daily activities

Symptoms typically begin 12–48 hours after the triggering activity, but may be immediate, or delayed up to 7 days. PEM lasts "usually a day or longer", but can span hours, days or weeks. In some cases, PEM can result in a relapse or even a permanent decrease of baseline capacity.

The level of activity that triggers PEM, as well as the symptoms, varies within individuals over time. Due to this variability, affected people may be unable to predict what will trigger it. This variable pattern can cause abilities to fluctuate from one day to the next.

=== Symptoms ===
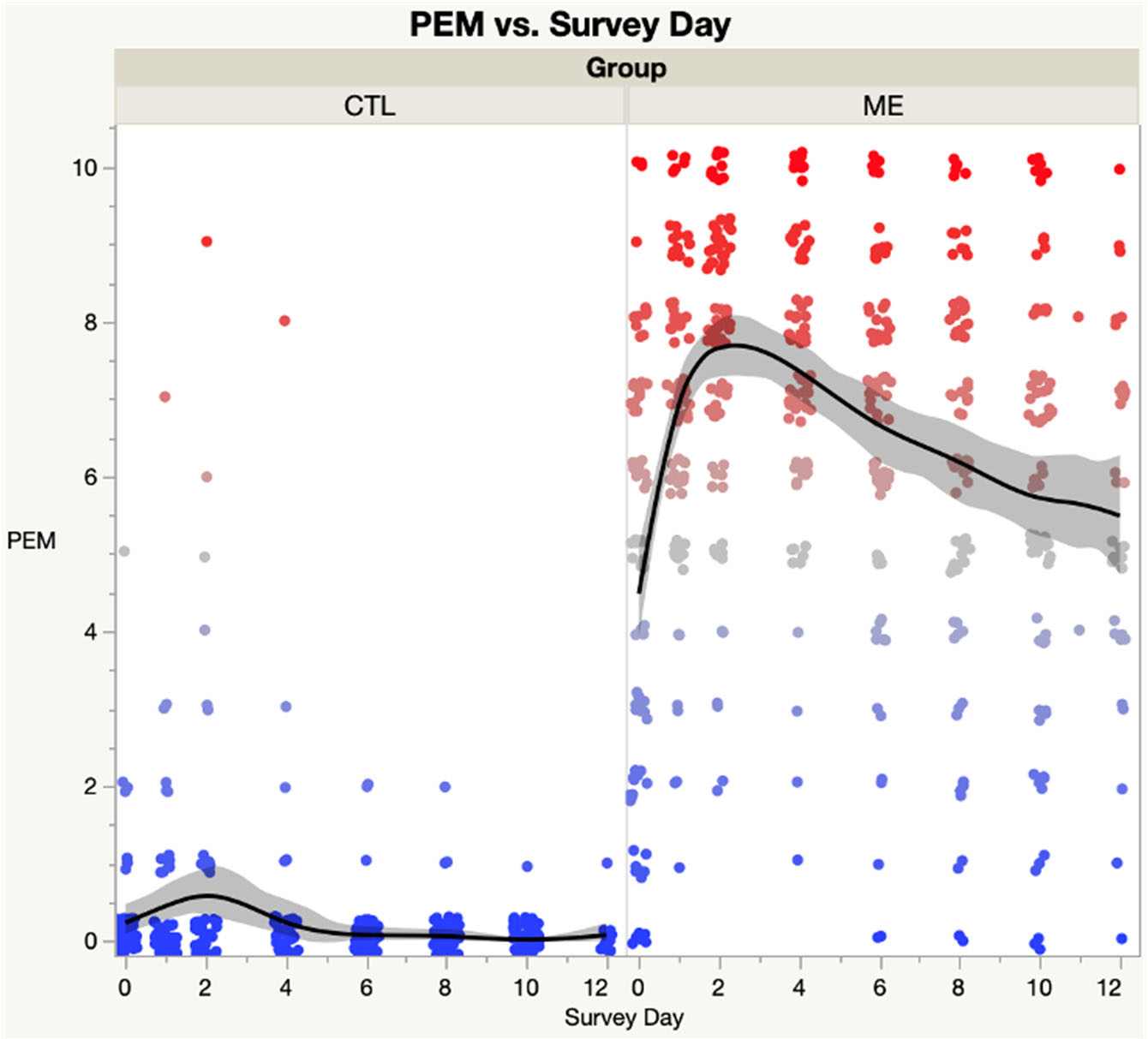
Symptom severity triggered by a 2-day CPET in people with ME/CFS. Healthy controls are shown on the left, and people with ME on the right.

PEM can produce a wide set of symptoms. This includes fatigue and a reduction in functional ability. Cognitive issues during PEM include impaired memory and slower processing speed. Physical symptoms can involve pain, weakness, dizziness, trouble sleeping and flu-like symptoms like a sore throat. Though typically cast as a worsening of existing symptoms, individuals may experience some symptoms exclusively during PEM.

The experience of PEM has been described as follows:

Some days can be absolutely horrendous […] Because of my fine motor control, I struggle to do up buttons, zip up shirts […] hold a knife. Legs are heavy, it's almost like dragging feet across the floor, and every small […] effort and heart rate [spikes].

When I do any activity that goes beyond what I can do—I literally collapse—my body is in major pain, it hurts to lay in bed, it hurts to think, I can’t hardly talk—I can't find the words, I feel my insides are at war.

== Diagnosis ==
Post-exertional malaise can be screened using a validated questionnaire, DSQ-PEM. As individuals with PEM may not be familiar with the symptom, they may not spontaneously raise it during a doctor's visit. Hence, the World Health Organization recommends that clinicians explicitly ask people with long COVID whether and which symptoms worsen with activity and for how long. Questions can be used to distinguish PEM from exercise intolerance, which can be caused by respiratory or cardiovascular conditions.

The 2-day cardiopulmonary exercise test (CPET) can be used to quantify PEM by researchers. The first CPET test induces PEM, which can be measured by the second test. The test comes with risk, as recovery can be prolonged, and is not suitable for people with more severe illness. The hand-grip test is an alternative test, which may be used for more severely affected individuals or in low-resource settings.

== Epidemiology ==
PEM is considered a cardinal symptom of ME/CFS by modern diagnostic criteria: the International Consensus Criteria, the National Academy of Medicine criteria, and NICE's definition of ME/CFS all require it. The Canadian Consensus Criteria require "post exertional malaise and/or [post exertional] fatigue". PEM was not a required symptom for chronic fatigue syndrome under the 1994 Fukuda criteria; its prevalence ranged from 25% to 100% in different studies, with a median of 85%.

Many people develop ME/CFS after an infection, and PEM is also prevalent in infection-associated chronic illnesses more widely. Around 55% of people with long COVID are estimated to experience PEM, and around 51% meet the diagnostic criteria for ME/CFS. It is also a symptom of Q fever fatigue syndrome.

== Mechanism ==
PEM is not well understood. Evidence from 2-day cardiopulmonary exercise testing (CPET) shows significant reductions in oxygen consumption and workload at the ventilatory anaerobic threshold during PEM.

One hypothesis is that people with ME/CFS or long COVID have a reduced ability to extract oxygen and therefore shift energy production to anaerobic glycolysis. This would be accompanied by a shift in glycolytic muscle fibers. The reduced oxygen extraction is thought to result from dysfunction of the mitochondria in muscle cells and from impaired blood flow in the smallest blood vessels. Features reported in affected people include damage to the lining of blood vessels, altered muscle tissue, and signs that muscle cells switch early to anaerobic energy production. This switch would lead to the build-up of lactate and reactive oxygen species.

These by-products would be able to activate the immune system in muscle and throughout the body, which in turn worsens the energy problems and disrupts the balance of sodium and calcium in muscle cells, leading to further muscle and mitochondrial damage. This could explain why symptoms worsen with a delay and last for days or weeks rather than appearing during the activity itself. Inflammatory signalling molecules released from tissues may also affect the central nervous system, causing generalised fatigue and worsening of neurological symptoms.

== Management ==
Pacing, a management strategy in which someone plans their activities to stay within their limits or energy envelope, is recommended to reduce the risk of PEM. Education about how to rest properly and sleep may be useful.

Graded exercise therapy (GET), which involves increasing activity levels in fixed increments, is contraindicated in the presence of PEM. If people want to try increasing activity levels, this only be tried in periods of stability (for instance a month without crashes), or alternatively, in periods of improvement. To prevent deconditioning, activities that are tolerated within an individual's limits, should not be avoided.

Management of flare-ups themselves involves a reduction in activities, and not returning to the baseline until the flare-up is resolved. Assistive technology and changes in the environment can help increase independence during crashes. For instance, people moderately or severely affected can benefit from walking sticks, wheelchairs or home modifications to make toileting easier.
