= 2-day CPET =

Medical test for post-exertional malaise

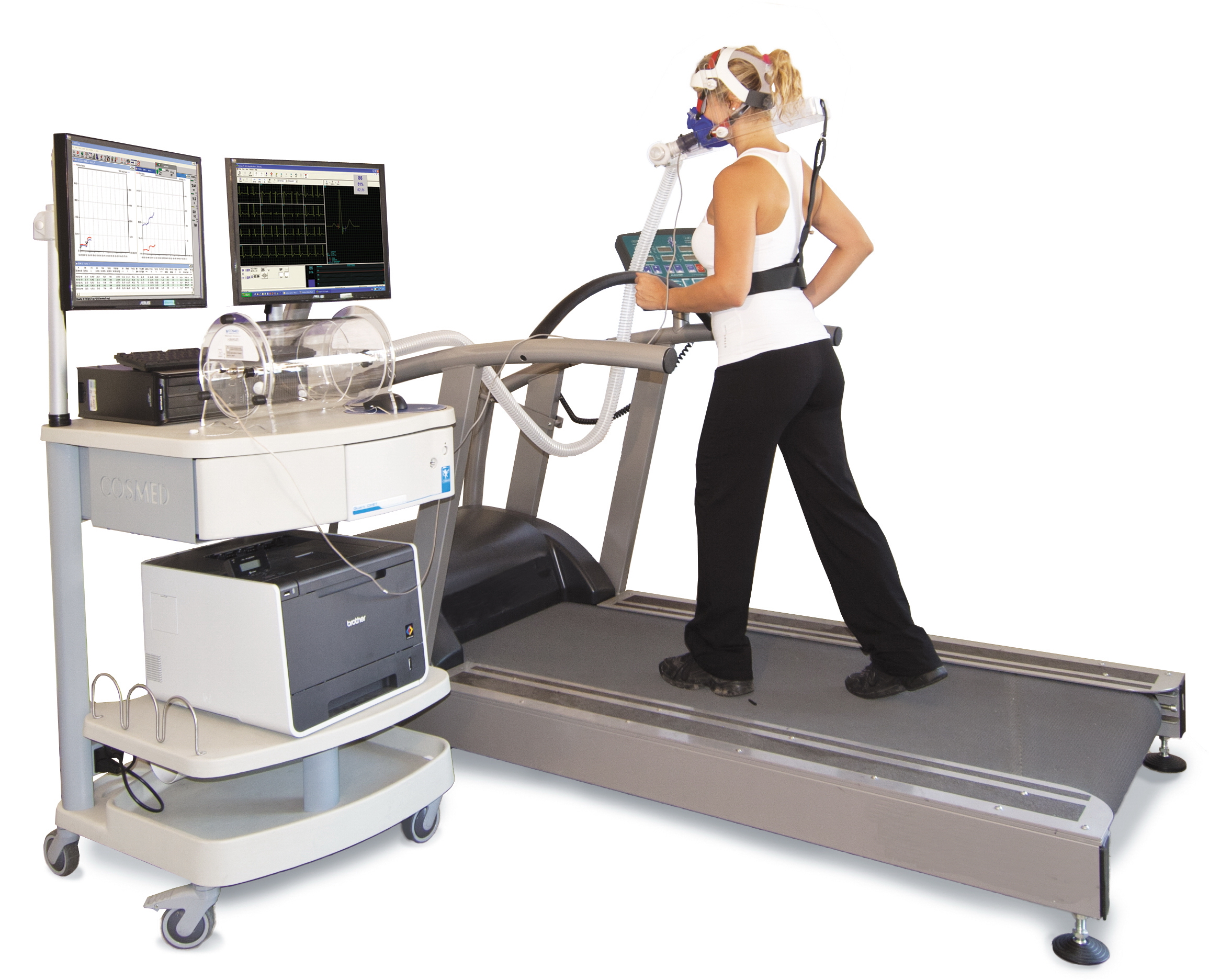
- A CPET being administered

A 2-day CPET is a cardiopulmonary exercise test given on two successive days to measure the effect of post-exertional malaise (PEM) on a patient's ability to exercise. PEM is a cardinal symptom of myalgic encephalomyelitis/chronic fatigue syndrome and is common in long COVID as well.

== Background ==
Several differences have been found between people with and without ME/CFS, including people with other diseases or who are sedentary. On the first test, people with ME/CFS exhibit lower performance and heart rate, and on the second test, performance is even lower, while for controls, it is the same or slightly better. The largest decrease is in anaerobic threshold, which signifies a shift from aerobic to anaerobic metabolism at a lower level of exertion, and is not influenced by effort. Peak power output, heart rate, and VO_{2}max also decrease, and in ME/CFS, but effort and familiarity with the test may affect VO_{2}max and power. Additionally, healthy people generally recover from a CPET within 24 hours while people with ME/CFS do not.

A 2-day CPET is hypothesized to measure PEM and its effect on physical functioning. (Objective indicators of maximal effort during both tests control for effort.) However, its utility has not been completely confirmed, as many studies of it have been small. While it should not be required for a diagnosis, a 2-day CPET can show that symptoms are not due to deconditioning and provide evidence for obtaining disability benefits. Because PEM is also a symptom of long COVID, the 2-day CPET may be useful in evaluating exercise intolerance there as well.

The cause of decreased performance is not understood. Proposals include impaired oxygen transport, impaired aerobic metabolism, impaired microvascular blood flow, loss of passive microvascular filtration and mitochondrial dysfunction.

The test provokes symptoms by design, and recovery may be prolonged. In some cases, it may worsen the illness long-term, as such it should only be applied to patients when absolutely necessary.

== Criticisms ==
A pilot comparison using the same 24 h repeat protocol found multiple-sclerosis patients showed day-2 VO₂ and workload shifts that overlapped CFS, undermining “uniqueness.” Repeat-CPET reliability studies in cardiac, pulmonary and multiple sclerosis cohorts report intra-individual variation of 4-7 % for VO₂-peak; several CFS papers cite falls in the 7-12 % range—just outside that noise band and within confidence limits of small samples. A 2015 PLoS One analysis explicitly questioned the sensitivity of CPET change-scores in fatiguing illness. On top of that PEM itself has been claimed to exist in cancer-related fatigue, however this study did not differentiate between PEM and exercise intolerance.
