= History of ME/CFS =

Aspect of medical history

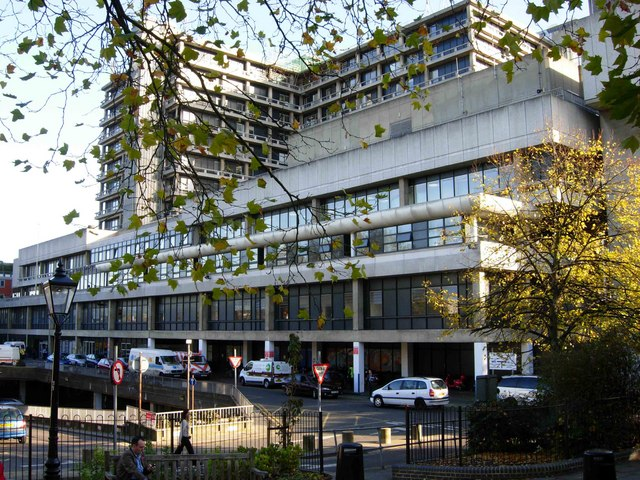
Royal Free Hospital in London, where myalgic encephalomyelitis came to prominent attention in 1955

Myalgic encephalomyelitis/chronic fatigue syndrome (ME/CFS) has a long history with an evolution in medical understanding, diagnoses and social perceptions.

In the early 19th century, the diagnosis of neuresthenia ('nerve weakness'), which had overlaps with current ME/CFS criteria, was popular. Various outbreaks of similar enigmatic disease occurred in the early 20th century, variably known as atypical poliomyelitis, Akureyri disease, or epidemic neuromyasthenia.

After an outbreak in the Royal Free Hospital in London in the mid-20th century, the disease became known as benign myalgic encephalomyelitis. The benign was later dropped, and this became the first case definition of ME, published in 1956. Controversy erupted when psychiatrists in 1970, who had not spoken to any of the patients, called the outbreak a case of "mass hysteria". The first definition of chronic fatigue syndrome (CFS) was published in 1988.

== Timeline ==
=== 19th century ===
Several descriptions of illness resembling ME/CFS have been reported for at least 200 years.

In the 19th century, neurologist George Miller Beard popularised the concept of neurasthenia, with symptoms including fatigue, anxiety, headache, impotence, neuralgia and depression. This concept remained popular well into the 20th century, eventually coming to be seen as a behavioural rather than physical condition, with a diagnosis that excluded postviral syndromes. Neurasthenia has largely been abandoned as a medical diagnosis. The ICD-10 system of the World Health Organization categorized neurasthenia under (F48 Other neurotic disorders) which specifically excluded chronic fatigue syndrome. The current version of ICD, ICD-11, does not include neurasthenia and "deprecates" its use.

=== Outbreaks in the 20th century ===
A United States Public Health Service (USPHS) official, Alexander Gilliam, described an illness that resembled poliomyelitis, after interviewing patients and reviewing records of one of several clusters which had occurred in Los Angeles, during 1934. The Los Angeles County Hospital outbreak included all or most of its nurses and doctors. Gilliam called the outbreak "atypical poliomyelitis" and described the symptoms as: rapid muscle weakness, vasomotor instability, clonic twitches and cramps, ataxia, severe pain (usually aggravated by exercise), neck and back stiffness, menstrual disturbance and dominant sensory involvement.

There was a cluster of "encephalitis" cases in 1936, at a convent in Wisconsin, amongst novices and convent candidates. The following year two towns in Switzerland had outbreaks of "abortive poliomyelitis", and 73 Swiss soldiers were given the same diagnosis in 1939. Outbreaks in Iceland were called "Akureyri disease" or "simulating poliomyelitis" and were later called "Iceland disease." 800 people in Adelaide, Australia became ill during 1949–1951 with a disease "resembling poliomyelitis." Two smaller clusters in the United States during 1950 were diagnosed as "Epidemic neuromyasthenia" and "resembling Iceland disease simulating acute anterior poliomyelitis." Additional outbreaks of poliomyelitis-like "mystery diseases" occurred from the 1950s through the 1980s, in Denmark, the United States, South Africa, and Australia, among others.

Several outbreaks of a polio-resembling illness occurred in Britain in the 1950s. A 1955 outbreak at the Royal Free Hospital Group was later called "Royal Free disease" or "benign myalgic encephalomyelitis". The term "benign myalgic encephalomyelitis" was selected to represent the lack of mortality, the severe muscle pain, symptoms suggesting damage to the nervous system, and to the assumed inflammation involved in the illness. Icelandic physician Björn Sigurðsson disapproved of the name, stating that the illness is rarely benign, does not always cause muscle pain, and is possibly never encephalomyelitic.

After the Royal Free Hospital outbreak, a disorder with similar symptoms was found among the general population and the epidemic form came to be considered the exception. Pathology findings, both in monkeys and in rare human casualties, led to the conclusion that the disorder was caused by inflammation of the brain and the spinal cord, particularly the afferent nerve roots, perhaps with neuroimmune etiology.

=== Psychological framing (1960s and 1970s) ===
In the 1960s and 1970s, chronic fatigue symptoms were often attributed to chronic brucellosis, but typically people were seen as having psychiatric disorders, in particular depression. Epidemic cases of benign myalgic encephalomyelitis were called mass hysteria by psychiatrists McEvedy and Beard in 1970, provoking criticism in letters to the editor of the British Medical Journal by outbreak researchers, attending physicians, and physicians who fell ill. The psychiatrists were faulted for not adequately investigating the patients they described, and their conclusions have been refuted. In 1978 a symposium held at the Royal Society of Medicine (RSM) concluded that "epidemic myalgic encephalomyelitis" was a distinct disease entity with a clear organic basis.

Despite the criticism, the paper by McEvedy and Beard had a large impact and the view of ME as a psychosomatic disease became prevalent for almost 50 years.

=== Case definitions (1986 onwards) ===
In 1986, Melvin Ramsay published the first diagnostic criteria for ME, in which the condition was characterized by: 1) muscle fatiguability in which, even after minimal physical effort, three or more days elapse before full muscle power is restored; 2) extraordinary variability or fluctuation of symptoms, even in the course of one day; and 3) chronicity. By 1988, the continued work of Ramsay had demonstrated that, although the disease rarely resulted in mortality, it was often severely disabling. Because of this, Ramsay proposed that the prefix "benign" be dropped.

The illness gained national attention in the United States when the popular magazine Hippocrates ran a cover story of an epidemic at Lake Tahoe, Nevada, in the mid-1980s. The designation Chronic Epstein–Barr Virus (EBV) was in use in the U.S., but the magazine used the colloquial term "Raggedy Ann Syndrome" to note the fatigue and loss of muscle power patients felt. Researchers investigating the Lake Tahoe cluster did not find evidence that EBV was involved, and they proposed the name "chronic fatigue syndrome", describing a main symptom of the illness. They published the first working case definition for CFS in 1988. Research increased considerably, and more so after the criteria were relaxed in 1994.

In 1990, researchers presented evidence they found DNA sequences very similar to the human HTLV-II retrovirus in some CFS patients, at a conference in Kyoto, Japan. Their study was later published in the Proceedings of the National Academy of Sciences. A reporter on Prime Time Live stated the announcement made headlines all over the world. The CDC first ignored their findings, then later conducted a study and published a paper that refuted the hypothesis.

In the United Kingdom, the Chief Medical Officer Kenneth Calman requested a report from the medical Royal Colleges in 1996. This led to the publication of a joint report in which the term "chronic fatigue syndrome" was found to be most representative. This was followed in 2002 by a further report by the new CMO, Liam Donaldson.

The U.S. Centers for Disease Control & Prevention (CDC) recognize CFS as a serious illness, and launched a campaign in June 2006 to raise public and medical awareness about it.

=== XMRV controversy ===
A 2009 study published in the journal Science reported an association between a retrovirus xenotropic murine leukemia virus–related virus (XMRV) and CFS. The editors of Science subsequently attached an "Editorial Expression of Concern" to the report, to the effect that the validity of the study "is now seriously in question". and in September 2011, the authors published a "Partial Retraction" of their 2009 findings; this was followed by a full retraction by the magazine's Editor in Chief, after the authors failed to agree on a full retraction statement. Also in September 2011, the Blood XMRV Scientific Research Working Group published a report, which concluded "that currently available XMRV/P-MLV assays, including the assays employed by the three participating laboratories that previously reported positive results on samples from CFS patients and controls (2, 4), cannot reproducibly detect direct virus markers (RNA, DNA, or culture) or specific antibodies in blood samples from subjects previously characterized as XMRV/P-MLV positive (all but one with a diagnosis of CFS) or healthy blood donors." In December 2011, the Proceedings of the National Academy of Sciences published a similar retraction for an August 2010 paper. Some members of the patient community, who had viewed the XMRV findings as a source of hope for a possible cure, initially reacted negatively when the papers were called into question. One UK researcher reported verbal abuse after publishing an early paper indicating that the XMRV studies were flawed.

== International classifications ==
The World Health Organization's (WHO) International Classification of Diseases (ICD), mandates the international classifications of diseases to allow comparison of health and health fields across countries and throughout the world. Not all terms appear in the tabular list (Volume 1), and many more terms are listed in the alphabetic index (Volume 3) of the ICD.

=== ICD-8 ===
Since its introduction into the eighth edition of the WHO ICD-8 in 1969 (code 323), (Benign) myalgic encephalomyelitis has been classified as a disease of the central nervous system.

=== ICD-9 ===
The term "benign myalgic encephalomyelitis" appears in the 1975 ICD-9 alphabetic index, and references code 323.9, Encephalitis of unspecified cause. The code 323.9 did not include reference to postviral syndrome. The term “postviral syndrome” was classified to code 780.7, Malaise and fatigue, in Chapter 16, Symptoms, signs and ill-defined conditions.

The name Chronic Fatigue Syndrome has been attributed to the US Centers for Disease Control 1988 research case definition for the illness, "Chronic fatigue syndrome: a working case definition". Chronic Fatigue Syndrome (CFS) was added to ICD-9 after 1988 and listed under code 780.71, Symptoms Signs and Ill-defined Conditions.

==== ICD-9-CM ====
Since 1979 the U.S. has used a clinical modification of WHO's ICD 9th revision (ICD-9-CM), and ME is under index: "Encephalomyelitis (chronic) (granulomatous) (hemorrhagic necrotizing, acute) (myalgic, benign) (see also Encephalitis) 323.9."

For CFS, a modification to the alphabetic index was made, effective on October 1, 1991, to direct users to code 780.7, Malaise and fatigue, the same code used to identify cases of postviral syndrome. In 1998, a new five-digit code included 780.71, Chronic fatigue syndrome, consistent with the WHO version of ICD-9. Chronic fatigue syndrome is classified in tabular list: "Symptoms, Signs and Ill-Defined Conditions," under the sub-heading of "General Symptoms".

=== ICD-10 ===
CFS is not included as a coded term in the 1992 ICD-10, WHO created a new category G93, Other disorders of brain, in Chapter VI, Diseases of the Nervous System, and created a new code G93.3, post-viral fatigue syndrome (PVFS), a condition which was previously in the symptom chapter of ICD-9. WHO also moved benign myalgic encephalomyelitis to G93.3, subordinate to PVFS. The alphabetic index contains other terms, such as chronic fatigue syndrome, to which WHO assigned the same code.

==== ICD-10-CM ====
The 2010 version of the ICD-10-CM separates CFS and Postviral fatigue syndrome into mutually exclusive categories. "Chronic fatigue, unspecified | Chronic fatigue syndrome not otherwise specified" appears in Chapter XVIII under R53.82. "Postviral fatigue syndrome | benign myalgic encephalomyelitis" appears in Chapter VI under G93.3. The Chronic Fatigue Syndrome Advisory Committee (CFSAC) had previously recommended CFS to be placed under the same neurological code as ME and PVFS, G93.3.

The 2023 update to the ICD-10-CM added a specific code for ME/CFS, G93.32, giving CFS a code separate from unspecified chronic fatigue.

=== ICD-11 ===
ICD-11 includes Chronic fatigue syndrome and Myalgic encephalomyelitis under Post-viral fatigue syndrome, (8E49), within the classification; Other disorders of the nervous system. Excluded is the condition of fatigue (MG22). Numerous index terms are presented, which represent current and historical names of the illness.

== Historical naming ==
A range of both theorised and confirmed medical entities and naming conventions have appeared historically in the medical literature dealing with ME and CFS. These include:

- Epidemic neuromyasthenia was a term used for outbreaks with symptoms resembling poliomyelitis.
- Iceland disease and Akureyri disease were synonymous terms used for an outbreak of fatigue symptoms in Iceland.
- Low natural killer syndrome, a term used mainly in Japan, reflected research showing diminished in vitro activity of natural killer cells isolated from patients.
- Neurasthenia had been proposed as a historical diagnosis that occupied a similar medical and cultural space to CFS.
- Royal Free disease was named after the historically significant outbreak in 1955 at the Royal Free Hospital used as an informal synonym for "benign myalgic encephalomyelitis".
- Tapanui flu was a term commonly used in New Zealand, deriving from the name of a town, Tapanui, where numerous people had the syndrome.
