= Akureyri disease =

Name used for a fatigue outbreak in Iceland

Akureyri disease (also called Iceland disease or epidemic neuromyasthenia) is the name used for an outbreak of what is now recognised as myalgic encephalomyelitis/chronic fatigue syndrome in Iceland. A disease with symptoms similar to poliomyelitis broke out in the town of Akureyri in northern Iceland in the winter of 1948–1949. The center of the epidemic was in the main secondary boarding school. The predominant symptoms were tiredness and exhaustion. Since the outbreak of the disease, those affected were often thought to have a psychiatric disorder such as hysteria.

The disease was first diagnosed as poliomyelitis and the first case was reported on September 25, 1948, in Akureyri. During the third and fourth weeks of November, this epidemic evidently was different from epidemics of poliomyelitis. The epidemic lasted for more than 3 months, and the total number of reported cases was 488.

This disease, also known as epidemic neuromyasthenia, has appeared in later decades in Louisville, Kentucky; Williamstown and Pittsfield, Massachusetts; Seward, Alaska; Dalston, England; and in the 1970s at Lackland Air Force Base, Texas.
