= Pacing (activity management) =

Technique for managing fatigue or pain

Pacing is an activity management technique for managing a long-term health condition or disability, aiming to maximize what a person can do while reducing, or at least controlling, any symptoms that restrict activity. Patients with varying fatigue-causing conditions such as multiple sclerosis, lupus, myalgic encephalomyelitis/chronic fatigue syndrome, and rheumatoid arthritis can benefit from exercise with pacing. Pacing is commonly used to help manage conditions that cause chronic pain or chronic fatigue.

== Aims of pacing ==
Pacing aims to manage symptoms and allow people with chronic energy-limiting conditions to be able to be as active as possible by avoiding the "boom and bust" cycle that is common among people exceeding their current, limited capacities. This often leads to being forced to stop their activities as a result of pain, fatigue, or other symptoms, and then requiring a large amount of rest before being able to resume their activity. The cycle then repeats. One goal of pacing for people with energy-limiting conditions is to prevent or limit post-exertional malaise (PEM) or crash by conserving energy by balancing activity and rest. PEM is an atypical response to mental or physical activity in which symptoms of an energy-limiting or chronic pain condition are exacerbated in the days following mental or physical exhaustion, sometimes lasting over a week.

== Elements of pacing ==
There is no consensus regarding what elements are part of pacing. Pacing typically involves:

- planning activities in advance
- taking regular rest breaks
- choosing activities based on available energy
- prioritizing activities

== Uses ==
Pacing has been used to help manage a wide variety of different illnesses and disabilities, including neuromuscular diseases like Charcot-Marie-Tooth disease (CMT), rheumatoid or immune-mediated diseases like rheumatoid arthritis, juvenile arthritis and fibromyalgia, ME/CFS, Ehlers–Danlos syndromes (EDS), and Long COVID.

== Methods of pacing ==
Pacing can be done using natural methods without therapeutic intervention and protocols or in more clinical and therapeutic settings including wearing trackers such as Apple Watches, Fitbits, MakeVisible, and other health trackers that have heart rate parameter tracking. Heart rate tracking can be an effective tool when used in a pacing protocol to detect variations in the autonomic balance for ME/CSF patients.

Therapeutic interventions of pacing include using tools such as an RPE Rating of perceived exertion scale or a CR-10 scale. The RPE scale can be modified for certain disabilities or illnesses including dyspnea There are typically two types of pacing interventions which are energy conservation and conditioning. The energy conservation approach is based on creating an energy bank or storage by conserving energy and only participating in activities that are within the energy allotment for the time period while the conditioning approach is geared towards participating in graduated activities to build an energy tolerance and ultimately decrease disability.

== Outcomes of pacing ==
Pacing has been shown to reduce post-exertional symptom exacerbation in people with long COVID. In many health conditions, there are no clinical trials to establish the effectiveness of pacing.

== See also ==
- Spoon theory
