= Myalgic encephalomyelitis/chronic fatigue syndrome =

Chronic medical condition

- Other names: Post-viral fatigue syndrome (PVFS), systemic exertion intolerance disease (SEID)
- The four primary symptoms of ME/CFS according to the National Institute for Health and Care Excellence
- Specialty: Rheumatology, rehabilitation medicine, endocrinology, infectious disease, neurology, immunology, primary care, paediatrics
- Symptoms: Worsening of symptoms with activity, long-term fatigue, sleep problems, others
- Usual onset: Peaks at 10–19 and 30–39 years old
- Duration: Long-term
- Causes: Unknown
- Risk factors: Female sex, family history, viral infections
- Diagnostic method: Based on symptoms
- Treatment: Symptomatic
- Prevalence: About 0.17% to 0.89% (pre-COVID-19 pandemic)

Myalgic encephalomyelitis/chronic fatigue syndrome (ME/CFS) is a disabling chronic illness. People with ME/CFS experience profound fatigue that does not go away with rest, as well as problems with sleep and memory or concentration. The hallmark symptom is post-exertional malaise (PEM), a worsening of the illness that can start immediately or up to days after even minor physical or mental activity. This "crash" can last hours, days or several months. Further common symptoms include orthostatic intolerance—dizziness or faintness when upright—and pain.

The cause of the disease is unknown. ME/CFS often starts after an infection, such as infectious mononucleosis. Studies find impairment in the nervous and immune systems, as well as in energy production. A diagnosis is established with the presence of clinical symptoms and systematic differential diagnosis, as there is no verified diagnostic laboratory test or imaging procedure available.

ME/CFS symptoms can improve or worsen over time, but a full recovery is uncommon. No therapies or medications are approved to treat the cause of the condition, and treatment or management is aimed at relieving symptoms. Pacing of activities can help avoid PEM which can worsen symptoms for extended periods, and counselling may help in coping with the illness. Before the COVID-19 pandemic, ME/CFS affected two to nine out of every 1,000 people, depending on the diagnostic criteria. Since the pandemic began, with the similarity of long COVID, many more people fit a diagnosis of ME/CFS. It occurs more often in women than in men and is more common in middle age, but can occur at all ages, including childhood.

The societal and economic impact of the disease is large, and the symptoms can be socially isolating. About a quarter of those affected are unable to leave their bed or home. People with ME/CFS often face stigma in healthcare settings, and care is complicated by controversies around the cause and treatments of the illness. Doctors may be unfamiliar with diagnosing the illness, as it is often not fully covered in medical school. Historically, research funding for ME/CFS has been far below that of diseases with comparable impact.

== Classification and terminology ==
ME/CFS has been classified as a neurological disease by the World Health Organization (WHO) since 1969, initially under the name benign myalgic encephalomyelitis. The classification as a neurological disease is based on symptoms that indicate a central role of the nervous system. Alternatively, on the basis of abnormalities in immune cells, ME/CFS is labelled a neuroimmune condition. The disease can further be regarded as a post-acute infection syndrome (PAIS) or an infection-associated chronic condition. PAISes such as long COVID and post-treatment Lyme disease syndrome share many symptoms with ME/CFS and are suspected to have a similar cause.

Many names for the illness have been proposed. The most commonly used are myalgic encephalomyelitis, chronic fatigue syndrome, and the combined umbrella term myalgic encephalomyelitis/chronic fatigue syndrome (ME/CFS). Agreement on a name has been difficult because the cause and pathology remain unknown. In the WHO's recent classification, the ICD-11, chronic fatigue syndrome and myalgic encephalomyelitis are named under post-viral fatigue syndrome. The term post-infectious fatigue syndrome was initially proposed as a subset of "chronic fatigue syndrome" with a documented triggering infection, but is also used as a synonym of ME/CFS, or for a broader set of fatigue conditions after infection.

Most individuals with ME/CFS object to the name "chronic fatigue syndrome", which was formalised in 1988. They consider the term simplistic, and that it trivialises the debilitating symptoms, preventing the illness from being taken seriously. There are also problems with the previous term used since 1956, "myalgic encephalomyelitis", as there is limited evidence of brain inflammation (myalgia means 'muscle pain' and encephalomyelitis means 'brain and spinal cord inflammation'). The umbrella term ME/CFS retains the often used phrase CFS without trivialising the disease, but some object to this name too, because they believe previous dissimilar diagnostic criteria for ME and CFS identify separate illnesses.

A 2015 report from the US Institute of Medicine recommended the illness be renamed systemic exertion intolerance disease (SEID) and suggested new diagnostic criteria. While the new name was not widely used, the diagnostic criteria were adopted by the Centers for Disease Control and Prevention (CDC). Like CFS, the name SEID only focuses on a single symptom, and opinion from those affected was generally negative.

== Signs and symptoms ==
ME/CFS causes debilitating fatigue, sleep problems, and post-exertional malaise (PEM, overall symptoms getting worse after mild activity). In addition, cognitive problems, orthostatic intolerance (dizziness or nausea when upright) or other physical symptoms may be present (see also § Diagnostic criteria). Symptoms significantly reduce the ability to function and typically last for three to six months before a diagnosis can be confirmed. ME/CFS usually starts after an infection. Onset can be sudden or more gradual over weeks to months.

=== Core symptoms ===
People with ME/CFS experience persistent debilitating fatigue. It is made worse by normal physical, mental, emotional, and social activity, and is not a result of ongoing overexertion. Rest provides limited relief from fatigue. Particularly in the initial period of illness, this fatigue is described as "flu-like". Individuals may feel "physically drained" and unable to start or finish activities. They may also feel restless while fatigued, describing their experience as "wired but tired". When starting an activity, muscle strength may drop rapidly, which can lead to difficulty with coordination, clumsiness or sudden weakness. Mental fatigue may also make cognitive efforts difficult. The fatigue experienced in ME/CFS is of a longer duration and greater severity than in other conditions characterised by fatigue.

The hallmark feature of ME/CFS is a worsening of symptoms after exertion, known as post-exertional malaise or post-exertional symptom exacerbation. PEM involves increased fatigue and is disabling. It can also include flu-like symptoms, pain, cognitive difficulties, gastrointestinal problems, nausea, and sleep problems.

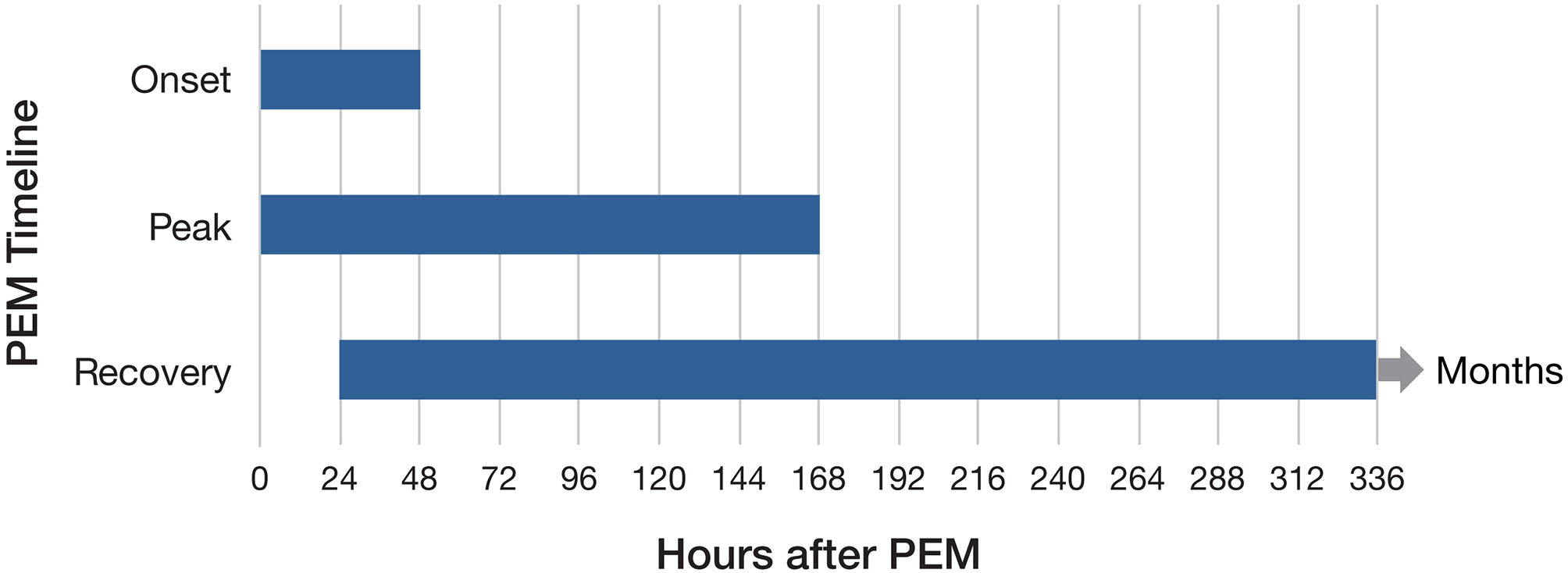
Typical time frames of post-exertional malaise after normal daily activities

All types of activities that require energy, whether physical, cognitive, social, or emotional, can trigger PEM. Examples include attending a school event, food shopping, or even taking a shower. For some, just being in a stimulating environment can be a sufficient trigger. PEM usually starts 12 to 48 hours after the activity, but can also follow immediately after. PEM can last hours, days, weeks, or months. Extended periods of PEM, commonly referred to as "crashes" or "flare-ups" by people with the illness, can lead to a prolonged relapse.

Unrefreshing sleep is a further core symptom. People wake up exhausted and stiff rather than restored after a night's sleep. This can be caused by a pattern of sleeping during the day and being awake at night, shallow sleep, or broken sleep. However, even a full night's sleep is typically non-restorative. Some individuals experience insomnia, hypersomnia (excessive sleepiness), or vivid nightmares.

Cognitive dysfunction in ME/CFS can be as disabling as physical symptoms, leading to difficulties at work or school, as well as in social interactions. People with ME/CFS sometimes describe it as "brain fog", and report a slowdown in information processing. Individuals may have difficulty speaking, struggling to find words and names. They may have trouble concentrating or multitasking, or may have difficulties with short-term memory. Tests often show problems with short-term visual memory, reaction time and reading speed. There may also be problems with attention and verbal memory.

People with ME/CFS often experience orthostatic intolerance, symptoms that start or worsen with standing or sitting. Symptoms, which include nausea, lightheadedness, and cognitive impairment, often improve again after lying down. Weakness and vision changes may also be triggered by the upright posture. Some have postural orthostatic tachycardia syndrome (POTS), an excessive increase in heart rate after standing up, which can result in fainting. Additionally, individuals may experience orthostatic hypotension, a drop in blood pressure after standing.

=== Other common symptoms ===
Pain and hyperalgesia (an abnormally increased sensitivity to pain) are common in ME/CFS. The pain is not accompanied by swelling or redness. The pain can be present in muscles (myalgia) and joints. Individuals with ME/CFS may have chronic pain behind the eyes and in the neck, as well as neuropathic pain (related to disorders of the nervous system). Headaches and migraines that were not present before the illness can occur as well. However, chronic daily headaches may indicate an alternative diagnosis.

Additional common symptoms include irritable bowel syndrome or other problems with digestion, chills and night sweats, shortness of breath or an irregular heartbeat. Some experience sore lymph nodes and a sore throat. People may also develop allergies or become sensitive to foods, lights, noise, smells or chemicals.

== Illness severity ==
ME/CFS often leads to serious disability, but the degree varies considerably. The illness severity is generally classified into four categories:

- People with mild ME/CFS can usually still work and care for themselves, but they will need their free time to recover from these activities rather than engage in social and leisure activities.
- Moderate severity impedes activities of daily living (self-care activities, such as making a meal). People are usually unable to work and require frequent rest.
- Those with severe ME/CFS are homebound and can do only limited activities of daily living, for instance brushing their teeth. They may be wheelchair-dependent and spend the majority of their time in bed.
- With very severe ME/CFS, people are mostly bed-bound and cannot care for themselves.

Results of a study on the quality of life of individuals with ME/CFS, showing it to be lower than in 20 other chronic conditions

Roughly a quarter of those living with ME/CFS fall into the mild category, and half fall into the moderate or moderate-to-severe categories. The final quarter falls into the severe or very severe category. Severity may change over time. Symptoms might get worse, improve, or the illness may go into remission for a period of time. People who feel better for a period of time may overextend their activities, triggering PEM and a worsening of symptoms.

Those with severe and very severe illness experience more extreme and diverse symptoms. They may face severe weakness and greatly limited ability to move. They can lose the ability to speak, swallow, or communicate completely due to cognitive problems. They can further experience severe pain and hypersensitivities to touch, light, sound, and smells. Minor day-to-day activities can be sufficient to trigger PEM.

Individuals with ME/CFS have decreased quality of life when evaluated by the SF-36 questionnaire, especially in the domains of physical and social functioning, general health, and vitality. However, their emotional functioning and mental health are not much lower than those of healthy individuals. Functional impairment in those affected can be greater than multiple sclerosis, heart disease, or lung cancer. Fewer than half of people with ME/CFS are employed, and roughly one in five have a full-time job.

== Causes ==
The cause of the illness is not yet known. Between 60% and 80% of cases start after an infection, which is most often viral. Besides viruses, other reported triggers include stress, traumatic events, and environmental exposures such as to mould. Bacterial infections, such as Q fever, might also be triggers. ME/CFS may occur after physical trauma, such as an accident or surgery. Pregnancy has been reported in around 3% to 10% of cases as a trigger. It can also begin with multiple minor triggering events, followed by a final trigger that leads to a clear onset of symptoms.

Other factors may include problems with the nervous and immune systems, as well as energy metabolism. ME/CFS is a biological disease, not a psychological condition, and is not due to deconditioning.

A genetic susceptibility is implicated, but no single gene is known to be responsible for an increased risk of developing the illness. Instead, specific combinations of gene variants and gene expression have been associated with MF/CFS.

=== Risk factors ===
ME/CFS can affect people of all ages, ethnicities, and income levels, but it is more common in women than men. In the United States, white Americans are diagnosed more frequently than other groups, but ME/CFS is probably at least as prevalent among African Americans and Hispanics. It used to be thought it occurred more commonly among those with higher incomes. Instead, people in minority groups or lower-income groups may have increased risks due to poorer nutrition, lower healthcare access, and increased work stress.

People with a history of frequent infections are more likely to develop the illness. Those with family members who have ME/CFS are also at higher risk, suggesting a genetic factor. Specific symptom combinations are associated with particular gene expression patterns, and indicate abnormal central nervous system and immune system pathology. The same genetic combinations correspond with other neurological and cardiometabolic conditions. Some fibromyalgia and major depression (MD) studies found similar gene variants, and neuroinflammation is confirmed in a subset of people with MD.

=== Viral infections ===
Viral infections have long been suspected to cause ME/CFS based on the observation the illness sometimes occurs in outbreaks and is possibly connected to autoimmune diseases. How viral infections cause ME/CFS is unclear; it could be via viral persistence or via a "hit and run" mechanism, in which infections dysregulate the immune system or cause autoimmunity.

Different types of viral infection have been implicated in ME/CFS, including airway infections, bronchitis, gastroenteritis, or an acute "flu-like illness". Between 15% and 50% of people with long COVID also meet the diagnostic criteria for ME/CFS. Of people who get infectious mononucleosis, which is caused by the Epstein–Barr virus (EBV), around 8% to 15% develop ME/CFS, depending on criteria. Other viral infections that can trigger ME/CFS are the influenza A virus subtype H1N1, varicella zoster virus (the virus that causes chickenpox and shingles), and SARS-CoV-1.

Reactivation of latent viruses, in particular EBV and human herpesvirus 6, has also been hypothesised to drive symptoms. EBV is present in about 90% of people, usually in a latent state. The levels of antibody to EBV are commonly higher in those with ME/CFS, indicating possible viral reactivation.

== Pathophysiology ==
ME/CFS is associated with changes in several areas, including the nervous and immune systems, as well as disturbances in energy metabolism. Neurological differences include autonomic nervous system dysfunction and a change in brain structure and metabolism. Observed changes in the immune system include decreased natural killer cell function and, in some cases, autoimmunity.

=== Neurological ===
A range of structural, biochemical, and functional abnormalities are found in brain imaging studies of people with ME/CFS. Common findings are changes in the brainstem and the use of additional brain areas for cognitive tasks. Other consistent findings, based on a smaller number of studies, are low metabolism in some areas, reduced serotonin transporters, and problems with neurovascular coupling.

Neuroinflammation has been proposed as an underlying mechanism of ME/CFS that could explain a large set of symptoms. Several studies suggest neuroinflammation in the cortical and limbic regions of the brain. Individuals with ME/CFS, for instance, have higher brain lactate and choline levels, which are signs of neuroinflammation. More direct evidence from two small positron emission tomography studies of microglia, a type of immune cell in the brain, were contradictory, however.

ME/CFS affects sleep. Individuals experience decreased sleep efficiency, take longer to fall asleep, and take longer to achieve REM sleep, a phase of sleep characterised by rapid eye movement. Changes to non-REM sleep have also been found, together suggesting a role of the autonomic nervous system. Individuals often have a blunted heart rate response to exercise, but a higher heart rate during a tilt table test when the body is rotated from lying flat to an upright position. This again suggests dysfunction in the autonomic nervous system.

=== Immunological ===
People with ME/CFS often have immune system abnormalities. A consistent finding in studies is a decreased function of natural killer cells, a type of immune cell that targets virus-infected and tumour cells. They are also more likely to have active viral infections, correlating with cognitive problems and fatigue. T cells show less metabolic activity. This may reflect they have reached an exhausted state and cannot respond effectively against pathogens.

Autoimmunity has been proposed to be a factor in ME/CFS. There is a subset of people with ME/CFS with increased levels of autoantibodies, possibly as a result of viral mimicry. Some may have higher levels of autoantibodies to muscarinic acetylcholine receptors as well as to β2 adrenergic receptors. Problems with these receptors can lead to impaired blood flow.

=== Energy ===
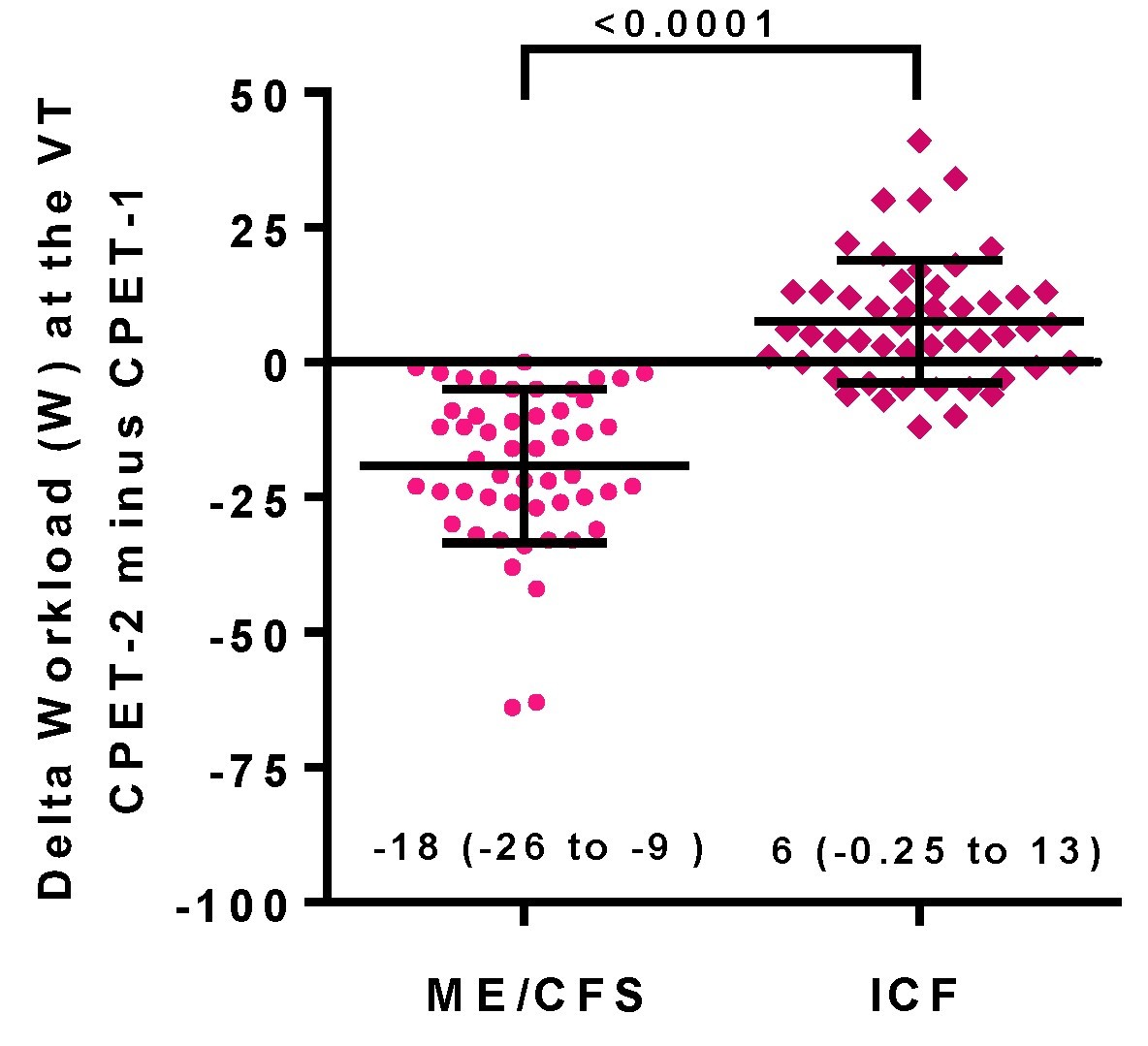
When people with ME/CFS exercise on consecutive days, their performance declines on the second day, unlike those with unexplained chronic fatigue (ICF).

Objective signs of PEM have been found with the 2-day cardiopulmonary exercise test. People with ME/CFS have lower performance compared to healthy controls on the first test. On the second test, healthy people's scores stay roughly the same or increase slightly, while those with ME/CFS have a clinically significant decrease in work rate at the anaerobic threshold. Potential causes include mitochondrial dysfunction, and problems with the transport and use of oxygen. Some of the usual recovery processes following exercise may be lacking, providing an alternative explanation for PEM.

Studies have observed mitochondrial abnormalities in cellular energy production, but differences between studies make it hard to draw clear conclusions. ATP, the primary energy carrier in cells, is likely more frequently produced from lipids and amino acids than from carbohydrates.

=== Other ===
Some people with ME/CFS have abnormalities in their hypothalamic–pituitary–adrenal axis hormones. This can include lower cortisol levels, less change in cortisol levels throughout the day, and a weaker reaction to stress and stimuli. Other proposed abnormalities are reduced blood flow to the brain under orthostatic stress (as found in a tilt table test), small-fibre neuropathy, and an increase in the amount of gut microbes entering the blood. The diversity of gut microbes is reduced compared to healthy controls. Female individuals with ME/CFS are more likely to experience endometriosis, early menopause, and other menstrual irregularities than those without the condition.

== Diagnosis ==
Diagnosis of ME/CFS is based on symptoms and involves taking a medical history and a mental and physical examination. No specific lab tests are approved for diagnosis; while physical abnormalities can be found, no single finding is considered sufficient for diagnosis. Blood and urine tests are used to rule out other conditions that could be responsible for the symptoms. People with ME/CFS often face significant delays in obtaining a diagnosis, and diagnoses may be missed altogether. Specialists in ME/CFS may be asked to confirm a diagnosis, as primary care physicians often lack a good understanding of the illness.

=== Diagnostic criteria ===
ME/CFS symptoms according to five diagnostic criteria
Symptom M: Mandatory O: Optional	CDC/Fukuda	CCC	ICC	IOM	NICE
Fatigue	M	M	M	M	M
Functional impairment	M	M	M	M	M
PEM	O	M	M	M	M
Sleep problems	O	M	O	M	M
Cognitive problems	O	O	O	O	M
Pain or headaches	O	M	O		
Orthostatic intolerance		O	O	O	
Flu or cold symptoms	O	O	O		
Nausea		O	O		
Cardiovascular problems		O	O		
Hypersensitivities		O	O		
Susceptibility to infection			O		

Multiple research and clinical criteria exist to diagnose ME/CFS. These include, but are not limited to, the NICE guidelines, Institute of Medicine (IOM) criteria, the International Consensus Criteria (ICC), the Canadian Consensus Criteria (CCC), and CDC criteria. The criteria sets were all developed based on expert consensus and differ in the required symptoms and which conditions preclude a diagnosis of ME/CFS. Many different definitions of the illness have evolved since the ME criteria, published in 1986, along with their concept of the cause and mechanisms of ME/CFS.

As there are no confirmed biomarkers that can diagnose ME/CFS, it is not possible to determine which set of criteria is the most accurate. A trade-off must be made between overdiagnosis and missing more diagnoses. The broad Fukuda criteria have a higher risk of overdiagnosis, whereas the strict ICC criteria have a higher risk of missing people. The IOM and NICE criteria fall in the middle.

The 1994 CDC criteria, sometimes called the Fukuda criteria, require six months of persistent or relapsing fatigue for diagnosis, as well as the persistent presence of four out of eight other symptoms. While used frequently, the Fukuda criteria have limitations: PEM and cognitive problems are not mandatory. The large variety of optional symptoms can lead to diagnosis of individuals who differ significantly from each other.

The Canadian Consensus Criteria, another commonly used criteria set, was developed in 2003. In addition to PEM, fatigue and sleep problems, pain and neurological or cognitive problems are required for diagnosis. Furthermore, three categories of symptoms are defined (orthostatic, thermal instability, and immunological). At least one symptom in two of these categories needs to be present. People diagnosed under the CCC have more severe symptoms compared to those diagnosed under the Fukuda criteria. The 2011 International Consensus Criteria defines ME using symptom clusters and has no minimum duration of symptoms. Similarly to the CCC criteria, ICC is stricter than the Fukuda criteria and selects more severely ill people.

The 2015 IOM criteria share significant similarities with the CCC but were developed to be easy to use for clinicians. Diagnosis requires fatigue, PEM, non-restorative sleep, and either cognitive problems (such as memory impairment) or orthostatic intolerance. Additionally, fatigue must persist for at least six months, substantially impair activities in all areas of life, and have a clearly defined onset. Symptoms must be present at least half of the time, and be of moderate severity or worse; previous criteria just required symptoms to be present. In 2021, NICE revised its criteria based on the IOM criteria. The updated criteria require fatigue, PEM, non-restorative sleep, and cognitive difficulties persisting for at least three months.

Separate diagnostic criteria have been developed for children and young people. A diagnosis for children often requires a shorter symptom duration. For example, the CCC definition only requires three months of persistent symptoms in children compared to six months for adults. NICE requires only four weeks of symptoms to suspect ME/CFS in children, compared to six weeks in adults. Exclusionary diagnoses also differ; for instance, children and teenagers may have anxiety related to school attendance, which could explain symptoms.

=== Clinical assessment ===
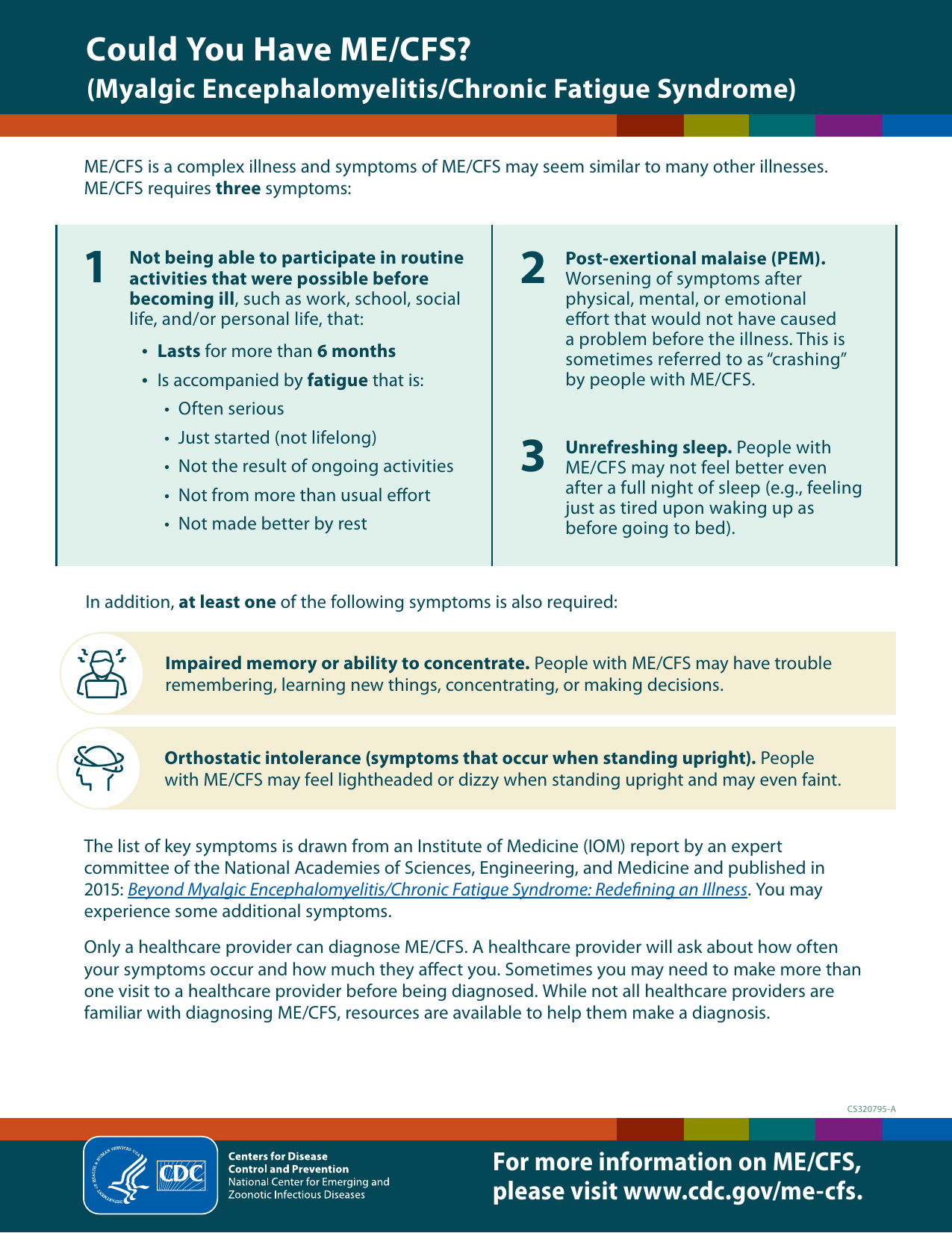
Could You Have ME/CFS? handout from the US Centers for Disease Control and Prevention

Screening can be done using the DePaul Symptom Questionnaire, which assesses the frequency and severity of ME/CFS symptoms. Individuals may struggle to answer questions related to PEM, if they are unfamiliar with the symptom. To find patterns in symptoms, they may be asked to keep a diary.

A physical exam may appear completely normal, particularly if the individual has rested substantially before a doctor's visit. There may be tenderness in the lymph nodes and abdomen or signs of hypermobility. Answers to questions may show a temporary difficulty with finding words or other cognitive problems. Cognitive tests and a two-day cardiopulmonary exercise test (CPET) can be helpful to document aspects of the illness, but they may be risky as they can cause severe PEM. They may be warranted to support a disability claim. Orthostatic intolerance can be measured with a tilt table test. If that is unavailable, it can also be assessed with the simpler NASA 10-minute lean test, which tests the response to prolonged standing.

Standard laboratory findings are usually normal. Standard tests when suspecting ME/CFS include an HIV test, and blood tests to determine full blood count, red blood cell sedimentation rate (ESR), C-reactive protein, blood glucose and thyroid-stimulating hormone. Tests for antinuclear antibodies may come back positive, but below the levels that suggest the individual may have lupus. C-reactive protein levels are often at the high end of normal. Serum ferritin levels may be useful to test, as borderline anaemia can make some ME/CFS symptoms worse.

=== Differential diagnosis ===
Some medical conditions have symptoms similar to ME/CFS. Diagnosis often involves clinical evaluation, testing, and specialist referrals to identify the correct condition. During the time other possible diagnoses are explored, advice can be given on symptom management to help prevent the condition from getting worse. Before a diagnosis of ME/CFS is confirmed, a waiting period is used to exclude acute medical conditions or symptoms which may resolve within that time frame.

Possible differential diagnoses span a large set of specialties and depend on the medical history. Examples are infectious diseases, such as Epstein–Barr virus and Lyme disease, and neuroendocrine disorders, including diabetes and hypothyroidism. Blood disorders, such as anemia, and some cancers may also present similar symptoms. Various rheumatological and autoimmune diseases, such as fibromyalgia, Sjögren's syndrome, lupus, and arthritis, may have overlapping symptoms with ME/CFS. Furthermore, it may be necessary to evaluate psychiatric diseases, such as depression or substance use disorder, as well as neurological disorders, such as narcolepsy, multiple sclerosis, and craniocervical instability. Finally, sleep disorders, coeliac disease, and side effects of medications may also explain symptoms.

Joint and muscle pain without swelling or inflammation is a common feature of ME/CFS, but is more closely associated with fibromyalgia. Modern definitions of fibromyalgia not only include widespread pain but also fatigue, sleep disturbances, and cognitive problems. This makes it difficult to distinguish ME/CFS from fibromyalgia and the two are often co-diagnosed.

Another common condition that often co-occurs with ME/CFS is hypermobile Ehlers–Danlos syndrome (EDS). Unlike ME/CFS, EDS is present from birth. People with ME/CFS are more often hypermobile compared to the general population. Sleep apnea may also co-occur with ME/CFS. However, many diagnostic criteria require ruling out sleep disorders before confirming a diagnosis of ME/CFS.

Like with other chronic illnesses, depression and anxiety co-occur frequently with ME/CFS. Depression may be differentially diagnosed by the presence of feelings of worthlessness, the inability to feel pleasure, loss of interest, and/or guilt, and the absence of ME/CFS bodily symptoms such as autonomic dysfunction, pain, migraines, and PEM. People with chronic fatigue, which is not due to ME/CFS or other chronic illnesses, may be diagnosed with idiopathic (unexplained) chronic fatigue.

== Management ==
There is no approved drug treatment or cure for ME/CFS, although some symptoms can be treated or managed. Care for ME/CFS involves multidisciplinary healthcare professionals. Usually, the primary care clinician plays an important role in coordinating health care, social care and educational support for those still in school. This coordinator can help provide access to community resources such as occupational therapy and district nursing. Management may start with treating the most disabling symptom first, and tackle symptoms one by one in further health care visits.

Pacing, or managing one's activities to stay within energy limits, can reduce episodes of PEM. Addressing sleep problems with good sleep hygiene, or medication if required, may be beneficial. Chronic pain is common in ME/CFS, and the CDC recommends consulting with a pain management specialist if over-the-counter painkillers are insufficient. For cognitive impairment, adaptations like organisers and calendars may be helpful.

Co-occurring conditions that may interact with and worsen ME/CFS symptoms are common, and treating these may help manage ME/CFS. Commonly diagnosed ones include fibromyalgia, irritable bowel syndrome, migraines and mast cell activation syndrome. The debilitating nature of ME/CFS can cause depression, anxiety, or other psychological problems, which can be treated. People with ME/CFS may be unusually sensitive to medications, especially ones that affect the central nervous system.

=== Pacing and energy management ===
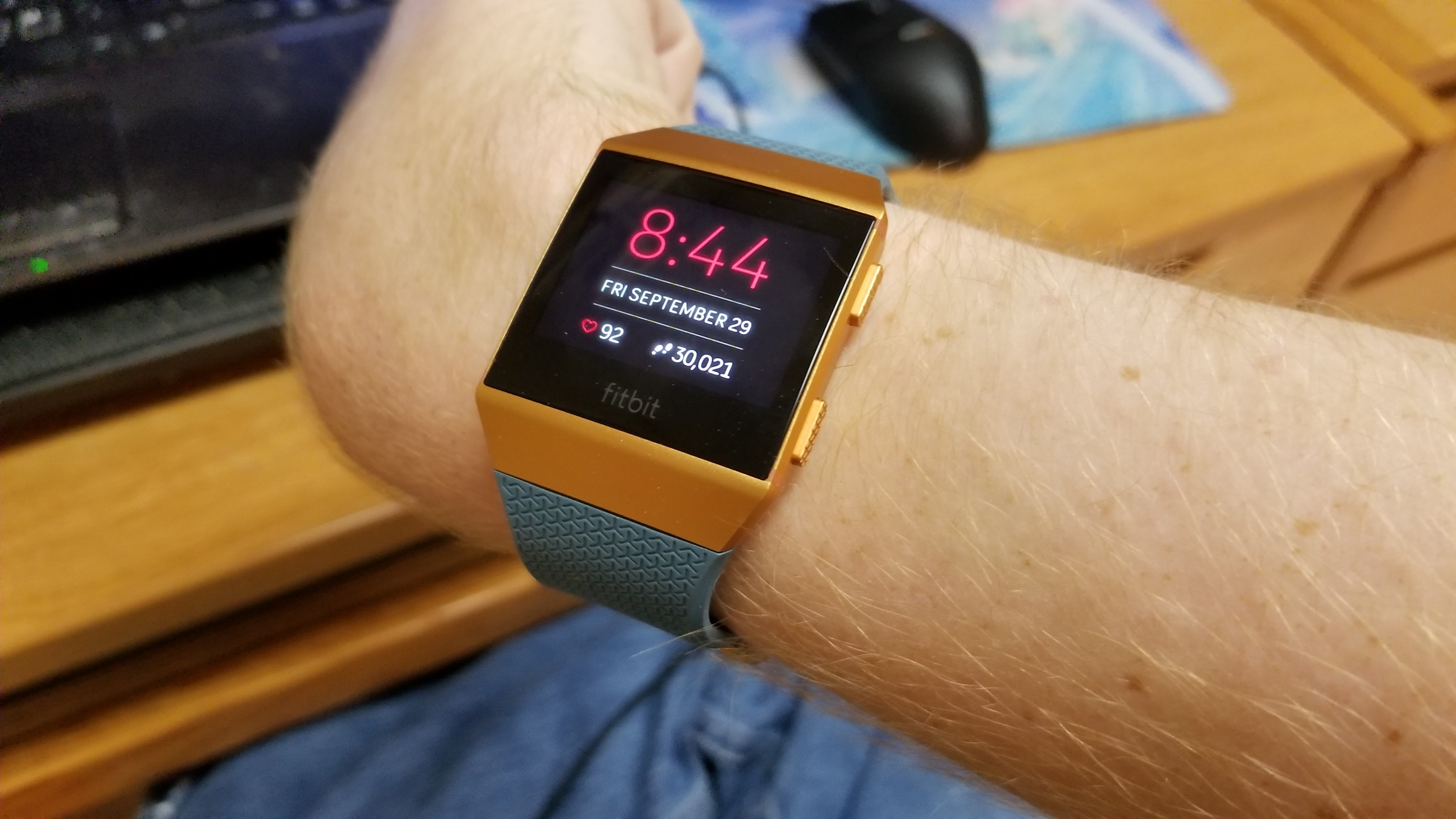
A heart rate monitor can be helpful for energy management.

Pacing, or activity management, involves balancing periods of rest with periods of activity. The goal of pacing is to stabilise the illness and avoid triggering PEM. This involves staying within an individual's available energy envelope to reduce the PEM "payback" caused by overexertion. The technique was developed for ME/CFS in the 1980s.

Pacing can involve breaking up large tasks into smaller ones and taking extra breaks, or creating easier ways to do activities. For example, this might include sitting down while doing the laundry. The decision to stop an activity (and rest or change an activity) is determined by self-awareness of a worsening of symptoms. Use of a heart rate monitor may help some individuals with pacing.

Research on pacing and energy envelope theory typically shows positive effects. However, these studies have often had a low number of participants and have rarely included methods to check if study participants implemented pacing well. Pacing is difficult to apply for people with very severe ME/CFS, as the activities that trigger PEM in this group, such as eating, cannot be avoided completely.

Those with a stable illness who understand how to "listen to their body" may be able to carefully and flexibly increase their activity levels. The goal of an exercise programme would be to increase stamina, while not interfering with everyday tasks or making the illness more severe. In many chronic illnesses, intense exercise is beneficial, but in ME/CFS it is not recommended. The CDC states:

Vigorous aerobic exercise can benefit people with many chronic illnesses. But people with ME/CFS do not tolerate such exercise routines. Standard exercise recommendations for healthy people can be harmful for patients with ME/CFS. However, it is important that patients with ME/CFS undertake activities that they can tolerate.

Graded exercise therapy (GET), a proposed treatment for ME/CFS that assumes deconditioning and a fear of activity play important roles in maintaining the illness, is no longer recommended for people with ME/CFS. Reviews of GET either see weak evidence of a small to moderate effect or no evidence of effectiveness. GET can have serious adverse effects. Similarly, a form of cognitive behavioural therapy (CBT) that assumed the illness is maintained by unhelpful beliefs about the illness and avoidance of activity is no longer recommended.

=== Symptom relief ===
The first management step for sleep problems in ME/CFS is improving sleep habits. If sleep problems remain after implementing sleep hygiene routines, cognitive behavioural therapy for insomnia can be offered. Avoiding naps during the day can further improve sleep, but there may be a trade-off with needed rest during the day. Drugs that help with insomnia in fibromyalgia, such as trazodone or suvorexant, may help in ME/CFS too.

Pain is initially managed with over-the-counter pain medication, such as ibuprofen or paracetamol (acetaminophen). If this is insufficient, referral to a pain specialist or counselling on pain management can be the next step. Heat treatment, hydrotherapy and gentle massage can sometimes help. In addition, stretching and exercise may help with pain, but a balance must be struck, as they can trigger PEM. While there is lack of evidence on pharmaceutical options for pain management in ME/CFS, medication that works for fibromyalgia may be tried, such as pregabalin.

Like in other chronic illnesses, those with ME/CFS often experience mental health problems like anxiety and depression. Psychotherapy, such as CBT may help manage the stress of being ill and teach self-management strategies. Family sessions may be useful to educate people close to those with ME/CFS about the severity of the illness. Antidepressants can be useful, but there may be more side effects than in the general population. For instance, it may be difficult to stop weight gain due to exercise intolerance.

Bowel problems are a common symptom of ME/CFS. For some, eliminating specific foods, such as caffeine, alcohol, gluten, or dairy, can alleviate symptoms. Those with orthostatic intolerance can benefit from increased salt and fluid intake. Compression stockings can help with orthostatic intolerance.

=== Severe ME/CFS ===
People with moderate to severe ME/CFS may benefit from home adaptations and mobility aids, such as wheelchairs, disability parking, shower chairs, or stair lifts. To manage sensitivities to environmental stimuli, these stimuli can be limited. For instance, the surroundings can be made perfume-free, or an eye mask or earplugs can be used. Those with severe ME/CFS may have significant trouble getting nutrition. Intravenous feeding (via blood) or tube feeding may be necessary to address this or to address electrolyte imbalances.

Patients who cannot move easily in bed may need help to prevent pressure sores. Regular repositioning is important to keep their joints flexible and prevent contractures and stiffness. Osteoporosis may pose a risk over the long term. Symptoms of severe ME/CFS may be misunderstood as neglect or abuse during well-being evaluations, and NICE recommends that professionals with experience in ME/CFS should be involved in any type of assessment for safeguarding.

== Prognosis ==
Information on the prognosis of ME/CFS is limited. Complete recovery, partial improvement, and worsening are all possible, but full recovery is uncommon. Symptoms generally fluctuate over days, weeks, or longer periods, and some people may experience periods of remission. Overall, many will have to adjust to life with ME/CFS.

An early diagnosis may improve care and prognosis. Factors that may make the disease worse over days, but also over longer periods, are physical and mental exertion, a new infection, sleep deprivation, and emotional stress. Some people who improve need to manage their activities to prevent a relapse. Children and teenagers are more likely to recover or improve than adults. For instance, a study in Australia among 6- to 18-year-olds found that two-thirds reported recovery after 10 years and that the typical duration of illness was five years.

The effect of ME/CFS on life expectancy is poorly studied, and the evidence is mixed. One large retrospective study on the topic found no increase in all-cause mortality due to ME/CFS. Death from suicide was, however, significantly higher among those with ME/CFS. In extreme cases, people can die from the illness.

== Epidemiology ==
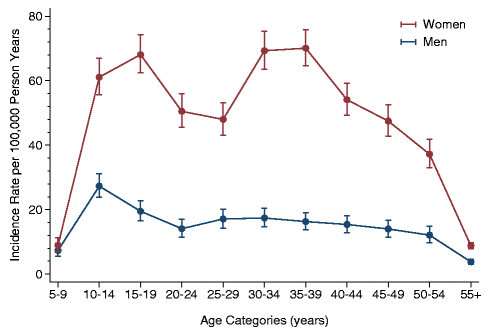
Incidence rates by age and sex, from a 2014 study in Norway

Reported prevalence rates vary widely depending on how ME/CFS is defined and diagnosed. Overall, around one in 150 people has ME/CFS. Based on the 1994 CDC diagnostic criteria, the global prevalence rate for CFS is 0.89%. In comparison, estimates using the stricter 1988 CDC criteria or the 2003 Canadian Consensus Criteria for ME/CFS produced a prevalence rate of only 0.17%.

In England and Wales, over 250,000 people are estimated to be affected. These estimates are based on data before the COVID-19 pandemic. It is likely that numbers have increased as a large share of people with long COVID meet the diagnostic criteria of ME/CFS. A 2021–2022 CDC survey found that 1.3% of adults in the United States, or 3.3 million, had ME/CFS. The 2026 National Institutes of Health research overview estimates that 18–26 million U.S. adults have ME/CFS, including cases associated with long COVID.

Women are diagnosed with ME/CFS about 1.5 to four times more often than men. The prevalence in children and adolescents is slightly lower than in adults, and children have it less than adolescents. The incidence rate (the onset of ME/CFS) has two peaks, one at 10–19 and another at 30–39 years, and the prevalence is highest in middle age.

== History ==
From 1934 onwards, there were multiple outbreaks globally of an unfamiliar illness, initially mistaken for polio. A 1950s outbreak at London's Royal Free Hospital led to the term "benign myalgic encephalomyelitis" (ME). Those affected displayed symptoms such as malaise, sore throat, pain, and signs of nervous system inflammation. While its infectious nature was suspected, the exact cause remained elusive. The syndrome appeared in sporadic as well as epidemic cases.

In 1970, two UK psychiatrists proposed that these ME outbreaks were psychosocial phenomena, suggesting mass hysteria or altered medical perception as potential causes. This theory, though challenged, sparked controversy and cast doubt on ME's legitimacy in the medical community.

Melvin Ramsay's later research highlighted ME's disabling nature, prompting the removal of "benign" from the name and the creation of diagnostic criteria in 1986. These criteria included the tendency of muscles to tire after minor effort and take multiple days to recover, high symptom variability, and chronicity. Despite Ramsay's work and a UK report affirming that ME was not a psychological condition, scepticism persisted within the medical field, leading to limited research.

In the United States, Nevada and New York State saw outbreaks of what appeared similar to mononucleosis in the middle of the 1980s. People suffered from "chronic or recurrent fatigue", among a large number of other symptoms. The initial link between elevated antibodies and the Epstein–Barr virus led to the name "chronic Epstein–Barr virus syndrome". The CDC renamed it chronic fatigue syndrome (CFS), as a viral cause could not be confirmed in studies. An initial case definition of CFS was outlined in 1988; the CDC published new diagnostic criteria in 1994, which became widely referenced.

In the 2010s, ME/CFS began to gain more recognition from health professionals and the public. Two reports proved key in this shift. In 2015, the US Institute of Medicine produced a report with new diagnostic criteria that described ME/CFS as a "serious, chronic, complex systemic disease". Following this, the US National Institutes of Health published their Pathways to Prevention report, which gave recommendations on research priorities.

== Society and culture ==
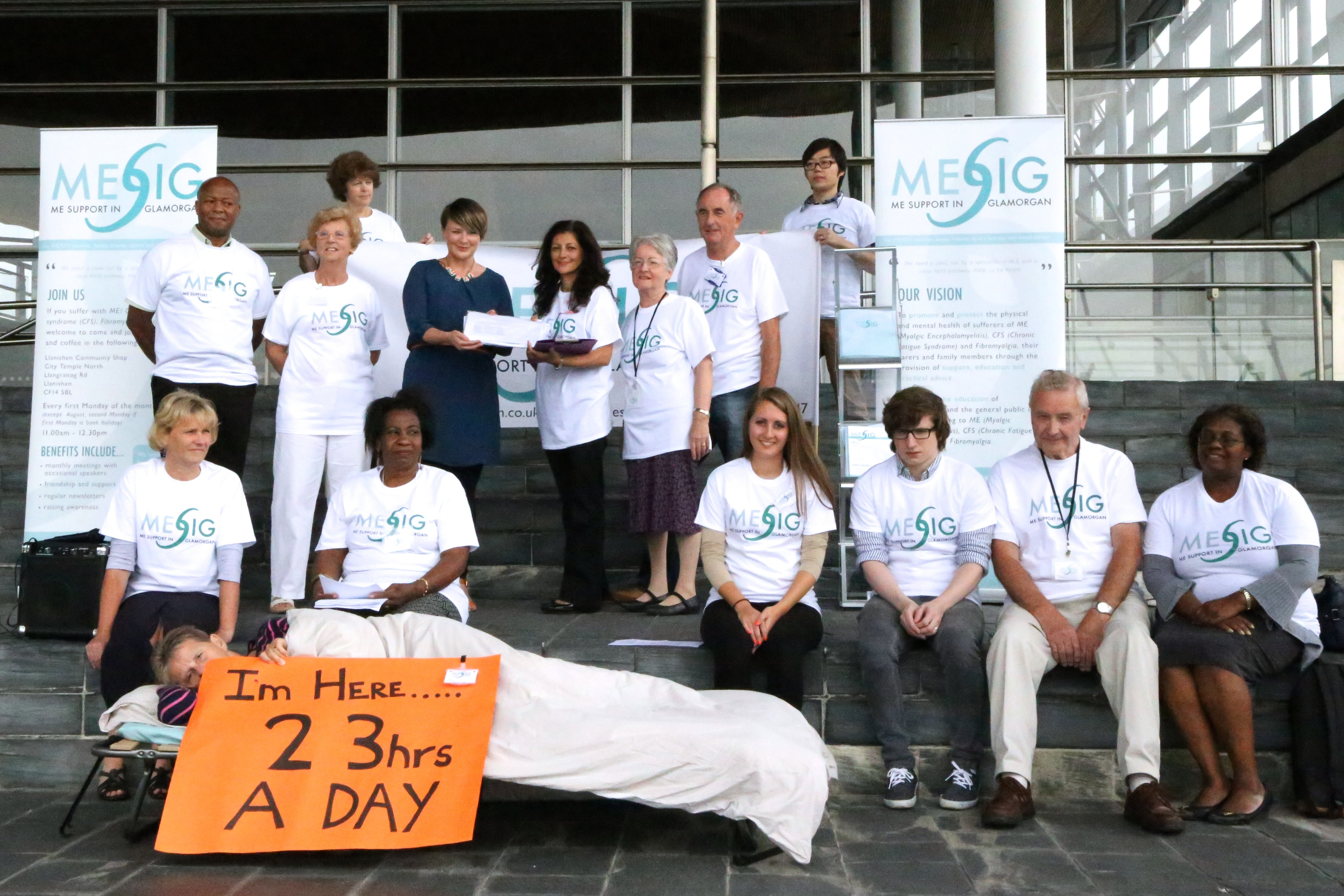
Presentation of a petition to the Welsh Parliament relating to ME support in South East Wales

=== Controversy ===
ME/CFS has been the subject of long-standing debate mainly revolving around the cause of the illness and treatments. Historically, there was a heated discussion about whether the condition was psychological or neurological. Professionals who subscribed to the psychological model had frequent conflicts with patients, who believed their illness to be organic. While ME/CFS is now generally believed to be a multisystem neuroimmune condition, a subset of professionals still see the condition as psychosomatic, or an "illness-without-disease".

The possible role of chronic viral infection in ME/CFS has been a subject of disagreement. One study caused considerable controversy by establishing a causal relationship between ME/CFS and a retrovirus called XMRV. Some with the illness began taking antiretroviral drugs targeted specifically for HIV/AIDS, another retrovirus, and national blood supplies were suspected to be tainted with the retrovirus. After several years of study, the XMRV findings were determined to be the result of contamination of the testing materials.

Treatments based on behavioural and psychological models of the illness have also been the subject of much contention. A large influential clinical trial on behavioural interventions, the 2011 PACE trial, concluded that graded exercise therapy and CBT are moderately effective. The trial drew heavy criticism. The study authors weakened their definition of recovery during the trial: 13% of participants then met a key criterion for recovery before the trial started. Several other aspects of the study were also criticized. A reanalysis under the original clinical trial protocol showed no significant difference in recovery rate between treatment groups and the controls receiving standard care.

=== Doctor–patient relations ===
People with ME/CFS often face stigma in healthcare settings, and the majority of individuals report negative healthcare experiences. They may feel that their doctor inappropriately calls their illness psychological or doubts the severity of their symptoms. They may also feel forced to prove that they are legitimately ill. Some may be given outdated treatments that provoke symptoms or assume their illness is due to unhelpful thoughts and deconditioning.

Clinicians may be unfamiliar with ME/CFS, as it is often not fully covered in medical school. Due to this unfamiliarity, people may go undiagnosed for years or be misdiagnosed with mental health conditions. As individuals gain knowledge about their illness over time, their relationship with treating physicians changes. They may feel on a more equal footing with their doctors and able to work in partnership. At times, relationships may deteriorate instead as the previous asymmetry of knowledge breaks down.

=== Economic and social impact ===
ME/CFS negatively impacts people's social lives and relationships. Stress can be compounded by disbelief in the illness from the support network, who can be sceptical due to the subjective nature of diagnosis. Many people with the illness feel socially isolated, and thoughts of suicide are high, especially in those without a supportive care network. ME/CFS interrupts normal development in children, making them more dependent on their family for assistance instead of gaining independence as they age. Caring for somebody with ME/CFS can be a full-time role, and the stress of caregiving is made worse by the lack of effective treatments.

Economic costs due to ME/CFS are significant. In the United States, estimates range from $36 to $51 billion per year, considering both lost wages and healthcare costs. A 2017 estimate for the annual economic burden in the United Kingdom was £3.3 billion.

=== Advocacy ===
The blue ribbon is used for ME/CFS awareness.

Patient organisations have aimed to involve researchers via activism but also by publishing research themselves—similarly to AIDS activism in the 1980s, which also sought to combat underfunding and stigma. Citizen scientists, for example, helped start discussions about weaknesses in trials of psychological treatments.

ME/CFS International Awareness Day takes place on 12 May. The goal of the day is to raise awareness among the public and health care workers about the diagnosis and treatment of ME/CFS. The date was chosen because it is the birthday of Florence Nightingale, who had an unidentified illness similar to ME/CFS.

== Research ==
Graph of ME/CFS papers published by year: Papers mentioning ME or CFS Papers whose title mentions ME/CFS

Research into ME/CFS seeks to find a better understanding of the disease's causes, biomarkers to aid in diagnosis, and treatments to relieve symptoms. The emergence of long COVID has sparked increased interest in ME/CFS, as the two conditions may share pathology and treatment for one may treat the other.

=== Funding ===
Historical research funding for ME/CFS has been far below that of comparable diseases. In a 2015 report, the US National Academy of Sciences said that "remarkably little research funding" had been dedicated to causes, mechanisms, and treatment. Lower funding levels have led to a smaller number and size of studies. In addition, drug companies have invested little in the disease.

The US National Institutes of Health (NIH) is the largest biomedical funder worldwide. Using rough estimates of disease burden, a study found NIH funding for ME/CFS was only 3% to 7% of the average disease per healthy life year lost between 2015 and 2019. Worldwide, multiple sclerosis, which affects fewer people and results in disability no worse than ME/CFS, received 20 times as much funding between 2007 and 2015. When comparing diseases based on years lived with disability, ME/CFS gets less than 1% of funding compared to the average. Funding cuts to Columbia University during the second Trump administration forced the closure of a large research programme dedicated to the disease.

Multiple reasons have been proposed for the low funding levels. Diseases for which society "blames the victim" are frequently underfunded. This may explain why COPD, a severe lung disease often caused by smoking, receives low funding per healthy life year lost. Similarly, for ME/CFS, the historical belief that it is caused by psychological factors may have contributed to lower funding. Gender bias may also play a role; the NIH spends less on diseases that predominantly affect women in relation to disease burden. Less well-funded research areas may also struggle to compete with more mature areas of medicine for the same grants.

=== Directions ===
Many biomarkers for ME/CFS have been proposed. Studies on biomarkers have often been too small to draw robust conclusions. Natural killer cells have been identified as an area of interest for biomarker research as they show consistent abnormalities. Other proposed markers include electrical measurements of blood cells and Raman microscopy of immune cells. Several small studies have investigated the genetics of ME/CFS, but none of their findings have been replicated. A larger study, DecodeME, is currently underway in the United Kingdom.

Various drug treatments for ME/CFS are being explored. Drugs under investigation often target the nervous system, the immune system, autoimmunity, or pain directly. More recently, there has been a growing interest in drugs targeting energy metabolism. In several clinical trials of ME/CFS, rintatolimod showed a small reduction in symptoms, but improvements were not sustained after discontinuation. Rintatolimod has been approved in Argentina. Rituximab, a drug that depletes B cells, was studied and found to be ineffective. Another option targeting autoimmunity is immune adsorption, which removes a large set of (auto)antibodies from the blood.

=== Challenges ===
Symptoms and their severity can widely differ among people with ME/CFS. This poses a challenge for research into the cause and progression of the disease. Dividing people into subtypes may help manage this heterogeneity. The existence of multiple diagnostic criteria and variations in how scientists apply them complicate comparisons between studies. Definitions also vary in which co-occurring conditions preclude a diagnosis of ME/CFS.

== See also ==
- List of people with ME/CFS
- History of ME/CFS
