= Deconditioning =

Adaptation of an organism to a less demanding environment

- Specialty: Physical medicine and rehabilitation
- Symptoms: Fatigue, weakness, muscle atrophy, joint stiffness, pressure ulcers/wounds, loss of appetite, constipation, depression, disorientation
- Risk factors: Old age, disability, prolonged hospitalization, chronic disease
- Prevention: Mobility exercises
- Treatment: Physical therapy, occupational therapy

Deconditioning is the adaptation of an organism to a less demanding environment, or, alternatively, the decrease of physiological adaptation to normal conditions. Deconditioning can result from decreased physical activity, prescribed bed rest, orthopedic casting, paralysis, and disability that can accompany aging. A particular interest in the study of deconditioning is in aerospace medicine, to diagnose, fight, and prevent adverse effects of the conditions of space flight.

Deconditioning due to lack of gravity or non-standard gravity action (e.g., during bed rest) results in abnormal distribution of body fluids.

Deconditioning as a syndrome has historically been associated with a number of medical disorders, including chronic fatigue syndrome, though whether it plays any role in the latter is highly controversial.

== Signs and symptoms ==
Patients affected by deconditioning can have almost all systems of their body negatively impacted. Fatigue is a manifestation of a decline in function in both the cardiovascular and pulmonary system. Effects of deconditioning on the heart include: decreased cardiac output, increased heart rate, orthostatic hypotension, and an inability to exert oneself. On the other hand, effects on the lungs include: increased pneumonia risk, decreased oxygenation of organs, and shortness of breath.

Deconditioning can impact the musculoskeletal system through muscle loss, weakness, increased bone fragility, and joint stiffness. These symptoms may increase the risk of fall and decrease the pain threshold that patients may have. One source states that muscles become significantly deconditioned at approximately 1 week of being immobile with 37.3% of patients being classified as sarcopenic. More specifically, it is found there is a 1.5% decrease in leg strength each day a patient is immobile, which equates to a 10% loss in total strength after a week of immobility. Other symptoms that deconditioned patients are at increased risk for are: constipation, urinary incontinence, increased blood viscosity, and skin ulcers/wounds (due to prolonged pressure from bedrest).

One body system that is commonly overlooked in patients with deconditioning is the psychological impact it can bring. Some psychiatric symptoms that deconditioned patients may experience are depression, anxiety, confusion, disorientation, and delirium. Specifically, patients with delirium are likely to increase their stay in the hospital by 2 times than without, 2 times more likely to fall, and 3 times more likely to result in early death.

=== Complications ===
Complications stemming from the changes due to hospital-associated deconditioning include aspiration pneumonia, hospital-acquired pneumonia, pneumothorax (collapsed lung), blood clots, urinary tract infections, falls, and fragility fractures.

== Causes ==
Factors that put a patient at risk for deconditioning include prolonged bed rest, old age, prior frailty, sarcopenia (muscles that are dysfunctional or reduced in size), chronic malnutrition, and prior cognitive issues.

== Treatment ==
Once a patient has been deconditioned, it typically takes double the amount of time they have been deconditioned in order to recover their prior condition.

== Prognosis ==
30% of elderly patients are able to regain the same level of function they were at prior to their deconditioned state after 1 year.

== Epidemiology ==
30-41% of older adults are affected by hospital-associated deconditioning following an acute hospital admission. Deconditioning has been observed to be the cause of delaying hospital discharges in 47% of older patients. Independent elderly adults are 4 times more likely to develop significant functional decline after a hospital stay.

== See also ==
- Atrophy
- Effect of spaceflight on the human body
