= Cardiopulmonary exercise test =

Test assigned by clinicians to test cardiopulmonary function

Cardiopulmonary exercise test (CPET), also known as cardiopulmonary exercise testing, is a non-invasive diagnostic assessment that assesses the combined performance of the cardiovascular, respiratory, and musculoskeletal systems during physical exercise. First developed in the early 20th century, CPET has become a gold-standard method for evaluating cardiorespiratory function. It is widely used to measure exercise tolerance, diagnose cardiopulmonary diseases and guide individualized treatment plans for patients.

During the test, key physiological parameters, including heart rate, blood pressure, oxygen consumption and ventilation patterns are continuously monitored while the patient performs graded exercise of increasing intensity, typically on a treadmill or cycle ergometer. Advanced data analysis is an essential component of CPET, enabling clinicians to interpret the body's response to physical stress and detect abnormalities that may not be evident at rest.

However, CPET may not be suitable for high-risk patients, such as those recovering from a recent heart attack or experiencing acute respiratory failure. Despite these contraindications, CPET remains widely utilized in clinical practice, and when combined with other tools, new applications continue to emerge.

== History and Development ==
The origins of cardiopulmonary exercise test (CPET) trace back to the early 20th century, when researchers began systematically studying the body's physiological responses to physical exertion. A key breakthrough occurred in the 1920s when scientists first recognized that measuring oxygen consumption (VO_{2}) during exercise could serve as an indicator of cardiopulmonary function, establishing the foundational principles of modern CPET.

A major milestone came in the 1950s with the introduction of the Douglas bag method, a technique enabling precise measurement of gas exchange (oxygen uptake and carbon dioxide output) during exercise, which significantly enhanced diagnostic accuracy. Further technological progress is made with the advancement of computerized systems in the 1980s, which automated data collection and analysis, enhancing the reliability and clinical utility of the test.

Today, the cardiopulmonary exercise test (CPET) has become a gold-standard diagnostic tool, valued for its ability to identify the underlying causes of exercise intolerance and assess integrated cardiopulmonary function. It plays a critical role in the assessment and management of various conditions, including heart failure, chronic obstructive pulmonary disease, and metabolic conditions. Beyond clinical medicine, cardiopulmonary exercise test has broad interdisciplinary applications including sports science, physiotherapy and rehabilitation.

== Equipment and Methodology ==
A cardiopulmonary exercise test (CPET) requires specialized equipment to collect precise physiological data during controlled physical exertion. The core components include:

=== Cycle ergometer or Treadmill ===
This equipment determines the exercise modality. While treadmills better simulate natural walking/running patterns, cycling is preferred for patients with balance issues, severe obesity, or orthopedic constraints.

A cycle ergometer is a stationary exercise bike which allows the respondents to pedal the bike under medical supervision. It can measure the amount of work done (in units of watts) by the respondent when he is performing the test. To increase the exercise intensity, the resistance can be increased over time.

The treadmill simulates walking/ running, the speed of which is adjusted incrementally to increase metabolic load in the test.

=== Spirometer ===
Spirometers record pulmonary parameters including tidal volume (VT), respiratory rate (RR), forced expiratory volumes (FEV), and airflow rates. It aids in diagnosing restrictive lung diseases or obstructive lung diseases.

=== Metabolic cart or gas analyzer ===
This kind of tool is mostly used to analyze the oxygen concentrations (VO_{2}) and carbon dioxide concentrations (VCO_{2}) in exhaled gas. This system makes use of infrared CO_{2} analyzers and an oxygen sensor made of zirconium oxide to measure the concentrations. These data will synchronize with a workload data for comprehensive assessment of gas exchange efficiency.

=== 12-lead electrocardiography system (ECG) ===
This electrocardiography system continuously tracks cardiac electrical activity, detecting exercise-induced arrhythmias, ischemic heart disease, ST-segment changes (a key landmark for contractility error in the heart), or conduction abnormalities. This represents the primary cardiac assessment tool, allowing visualization of cardiac performance.

=== Ancillary equipment ===
This kind of equipment is not compulsory but is often added to this test to ensure precise measurement and safety. Blood pressure cuffs monitor systolic and diastolic blood pressures at 2-3 minute intervals of the individual in the test. Pulse oximeters track peripheral oxygen saturation to detect exercise-induced hypoxemia. Safety gears such as bronchodilators or defibrillators are on standby for addressing rare complications like exercise-induced asthma during the test.

All devices should undergo rigorous pre-test calibration by technicians to ensure accurate measurement, and tests must be conducted under continuous medical supervision to ensure safety and data accuracy.

== Protocol ==
Cardiopulmonary exercise test (CPET) serves as a comprehensive diagnostic tool in a clinical setting. Utilizing a standardized protocol with breath-by-breath analysis, the test precisely measures oxygen uptake and carbon dioxide output, synchronizing these measurements with real-time workload data to provide a complete assessment of cardiopulmonary function. The protocol is structured into four consecutive phases (resting phase, unloaded phase, incremental exercise phase, and recovery phase), each designed to systematically assess physiological systems while ensuring patient safety. This approach is effective in revealing limitations in oxygen delivery, metabolic efficiency, and ventilatory capacity.

1. Resting phase: Before exercise begins, a 2-3 minute baseline period establishes pre-test measurements of heart rate, blood pressure, and respiratory gas exchange values. These values provide reference points for interpreting subsequent exercise-induced physiological changes.

2. Unloaded phase: This phase transits from rest to exercise, typically done by a 2-3 minute period of low-intensity exercise, either cycling without resistance on an ergometer or walking at a slow pace on a treadmill. This warm-up period serves multiple purposes: it allows patients to acclimate to the equipment, stabilizes physiological variables, and prepares the body for more intense exertion while minimizing abrupt cardiovascular demands.

3. Incremental exercise phase: The core of the test involves an 8-12 minute period of progressively increasing workload, referred to as a ramp modality. The ramp protocol is individually tailored based on fitness level. Severely impaired individuals will have a slower increment rate than fitter subjects. Fitter subjects will have a workload increment rate as high as 25 - 30W/minute, while for debilitated patients, 5W/minute may be used. This phase continues until maximal exertion is achieved, determined either by patient symptoms or objective criteria like the respiratory exchange ratio (RER). RER is calculated as the ratio of VCO_{2} to VO_{2} (RER = VCO_{2}/VO_{2}); when this ratio exceeds 1.15, it indicates maximal metabolic stress.

4. Recovery phase: Following peak exertion, a 3-5 minute active recovery period monitors the body's return to baseline. For cycle ergometer tests, the workload should be kept below 15W. For treadmill tests, a lower speed between 1.0 and 1.6 km/hour should be applied. It allows clinicians to monitor post-exercise stabilization of heart rate, blood pressure, and ventilation. An abnormal recovery profile may indicate underlying cardiovascular or autonomic dysfunction.

CPET is invaluable for diagnosing in a clinical setting. CPET's holistic analysis distinguishes cardiovascular, respiratory, or metabolic dysfunction, guiding targeted therapeutic strategies.

== The 9-panel analysis of cardiopulmonary exercise test ==
In Cardiopulmonary exercise test (CPET), the interpretation relies heavily on the standardized nine-panel display. This display arranges key physiological variables across nine coordinated plots to reveal the relationships between different systems during exercise. Each panel highlights specific aspects of cardiopulmonary function, such as ventilatory efficiency, oxygen uptake kinetics.

=== Parameters required for analysis ===
- Pulmonary metrics: O2 consumption (VO_{2}), CO_{2} production (VCO_{2}), oxygen saturation in blood (SpO2), minute ventilation (VE)
- Cardiovascular metrics: Heart rate, blood pressure, ECG-derived contractility
- Functional capacity: Peak workload (watts/speed) and maximal oxygen uptake

=== Details of the 9-panel analysis ===
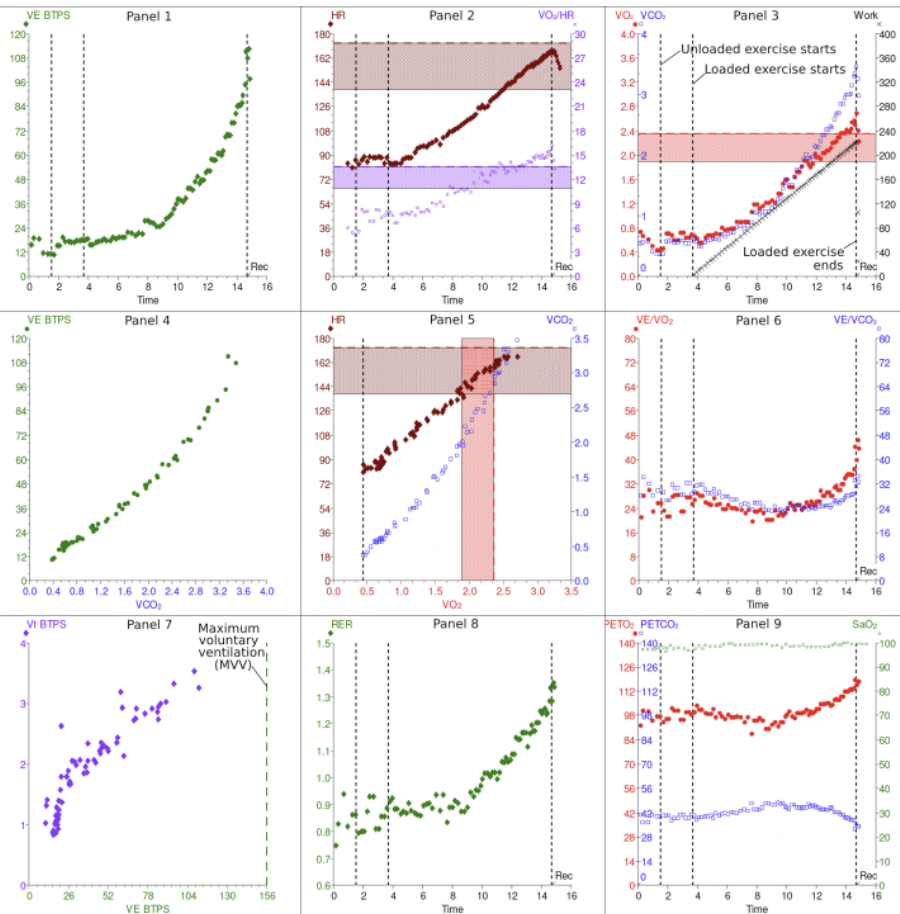
9-panel analysis of cardiopulmonary exercise test.

The original nine panels are arranged in order from left to right, from top to bottom. In nine panels, Panel 2,3,5 indicates the cardiovascular system; Panel 1,4,7 shows ventilation; Panel 6,8,9 represents ventilation-perfusion relationships.

1. VO_{2}, VCO_{2}, VE vs. time: Tracks oxygen uptake, CO_{2} output, and ventilation, showing exercise response. VE is supposed to increase with workload smoothly. EOV (exercise oscillatory ventilation) is noted.
2. Heart rate & O_{2} pulse vs. time: Monitors heart rate and oxygen delivery efficiency. It shows the maximum cardiac ability to pump blood for oxygen delivery.
3. VE vs. VCO_{2}: Measures ventilatory efficiency via the slope of ventilation to CO_{2} output.
4. VE vs. VO_{2}: Assesses breathing efficiency relative to oxygen use.
5. VO_{2} vs. work rate: Links oxygen uptake to workload, spotting abnormal responses.
6. VCO_{2} vs. VO_{2}: Marks the anaerobic threshold where CO_{2} exceeds O_{2} due to lactic acid.
7. PetO_{2} & PetCO_{2} vs. time: Reflects lung gas exchange through end-tidal O_{2} and CO_{2}.
8. VE/VCO_{2} & VE/VO_{2} vs. time: Indicates gas exchange efficiency. It represents the ventilatory limitations during exercise.
9. RER vs. time: Shows respiratory exchange ratio (VCO_{2}/VO_{2}), highlighting fuel use and anaerobic shift.

The 9-panel analysis is a framework for interpreting CPET data, but its panel order, parameters, and emphasis may vary across institutions or clinical scenarios to optimize diagnostic insights.

== Key interpretation of the 9-panel analysis ==
Cardiopulmonary exercise test provides a multidimensional assessment of cardiovascular, respiratory, and metabolic function during physical exertion. It can provide several key interpretations (integrated information). Key physiological parameters derived from CPET include:

=== Anaerobic threshold (AT) ===
The anaerobic threshold marks the exercise intensity at which an individual's energy production shifts from predominantly aerobic respiration (oxygen-dependent) to anaerobic respiration. This transition occurs when oxygen delivery to muscles becomes insufficient to meet demand, leading to lactic acid accumulation. This transition can be identified through gas exchange analysis, specifically a nonlinear increase in VCO_{2} relative to VO_{2} or an abrupt rise in minute ventilation. The anaerobic threshold usually occurs between 47% and 64% of VO_{2} max, meaning 47-64% of maximum oxygen uptake in the test. A lower anaerobic threshold indicates an oxygen delivery impairment.

=== Electrocardiographic findings ===
Continuous 12-lead ECG monitoring during CPET evaluates cardiac contractility and rhythm stability under stress. The ECG should show minimal waveform changes and no significant deviation from normal sinus rhythm. Abnormalities denote potential cardiovascular diseases.

=== Gas exchange efficiency ===
The ability to oxygenate blood and remove CO_{2} can also be measured during the test. By increasing the exercise intensity, the pulmonary system's capacity to oxygenate blood and eliminate CO_{2} is exposed. The presence of exercise-induced desaturation with a SpO2 drop of more than 4% during exercise is a significant sign of ventilatory error. It manifests potential interstitial lung disease.

=== Peak oxygen uptake ===
Peak oxygen uptake is achieved during maximal exercise, indicated by a plateau in the VO_{2} curve. During the plateau, VO_{2} no longer increases even with progressive increments in exercise workload. Clinically, values falling below 85% of age and sex-predicted norms indicate functional impairment, with established correlation to heart failure, pulmonary hypertension, or metabolic disorders.

=== EOV (exercise oscillatory ventilation) ===
It is described as the oscillating frequency of ventilation during exercise. In normal individuals, a continuous linear rise instead of oscillating. An oscillating pattern that persists ≥60% of the exercise test at an amplitude of ≥15% of the average resting baseline represents potential respiratory conditions such as chemoreceptor dysregulation.

These parameters obtained through cardiopulmonary exercise tests provide objective physiological evidence to either confirm or refine preliminary clinical diagnoses. These measurements also enable quantitative assessment of disease severity.

== Clinical significance ==
The cardiopulmonary exercise test is widely used in clinical treatment, from pre-operative risk stratification to determining a specific disease process.

- Used in preoperative assessment to evaluate surgical risk, especially in patients with known or suspected cardiopulmonary disease. It could also be used to assess fitness for transplantation, determining cardiopulmonary reserve for procedures like heart or lung transplants.
- Identify the intolerance to exercise of an individual, mostly athletes. It could be used to show the cardiopulmonary vascular limitation and the improvement in individuals who are in rehabilitation programs.
- Provide prognostic insights and guide therapeutic decision-making, particularly in heart failure management. For patients with heart failure, it is valuable in assessing severity and guiding decisions on device implantation.

== Contraindications ==
Although the cardiopulmonary exercise test (CPET) is a well-established diagnostic tool, it carries certain risks depending on the patient's health condition. These risks can be categorized as absolute contraindications (prohibiting testing) and relative contraindications(requiring risk-benefit analysis).

=== Absolute Contraindications ===
CPET is strictly avoided in these acute cardiopulmonary conditions due to the high risk of developing life-threatening complications. These include:

- Active/Post Myocardial ischemia – Reduced blood flow to the heart muscle, which may worsen under exercise, potentially leading to myocardial infarction (heart attack) if oxygen demand exceeds supply.
- Pulmonary edema – Fluid accumulation in the lungs' alveoli, impairing gas exchange and reducing oxygen uptake.
- Respiratory failure – Inadequate oxygenation or ventilation due to airway obstruction or impaired gas diffusion, leading to ventilation-perfusion mismatch and hypoxemia (low blood oxygen).
- Decompensated heart failure
- uncontrolled arrhythmias
- untreated pulmonary embolism or deep venous thrombosis
- Other severe cardiopulmonary-related conditions

These conditions compromise cardiopulmonary function, limiting oxygen delivery during exercise and increasing the risk of hypoxemic hypoxia (oxygen deficiency in tissues).

=== Relative Contraindications ===
Relative contraindications include chronic conditions that may elevate risk but do not outright prohibit testing. Key examples are:

- Hypertension – Persistently elevated blood pressure, often linked to endothelial dysfunction(impaired blood vessel dilation due to reduced nitric oxide bioavailability). Chronic hypertension can damage arterial walls, promoting atherosclerosis.
- Coronary heart disease (CHD) – Atherosclerotic plaque buildup in the coronary arteries, which may rupture during exercise, triggering thrombosis (blood clot formation) and vessel occlusion. This can lead to acute myocardial ischemia or infarction.
- Pregnancy
- Symptomatic tachycardia or bradycardia

These conditions impair cardiovascular efficiency, increasing the strain on the heart and lungs during CPET. And may lead to severe consequences if CPET is in progress.

If any of the below are observed in the patients during the test, this test needs to be terminated immediately: Hypotension, Arrhythmias, Leg claudication, ST-segment depression, Cardiac chest pain.

== Future Directions ==
More applications of the CPET may appear by combining the results with other medical tests, as well as introducing wearable technology, which makes it more accessible to the public. Future developments include integrating CPET with imaging like echocardiography for detailed cardiac function. Automated interpretation tools can also be incorporated into cardiopulmonary exercise tests in the future, to reduce subjectivity during clinicians' diagnoses. These innovations aim to enhance CPET's diagnostic precision while improving accessibility. Continued research is needed to validate these approaches and establish standardized implementation protocols.

== See also ==
- Cardiac stress test
- Pulmonary function testing
