= Foreign policy of the first Trump administration =

U.S. foreign policy during the first presidency of Donald Trump was noted for its unpredictability and reneging on prior international commitments, upending diplomatic conventions, embracing political and economic brinkmanship with most adversaries, and stronger relations with traditional allies. Donald Trump's "America First" policy pursued nationalist and unilateralist foreign policy objectives while prioritizing bilateral relations over multinational agreements. As president, Trump described himself as a nationalist and a globalist while espousing views that have been characterized as isolationist, non-interventionist, and protectionist, although the "isolationist" label has been disputed, including by Trump himself, and periods of his political career have been described by the alternative term "semi-isolationist". Trump personally praised some populist, neo-nationalist, illiberal, and authoritarian governments, while antagonizing others, even as administration diplomats nominally continued to pursue pro-democracy ideals abroad.

Upon taking office, Trump relied more on military personnel than any previous administration since the presidency of Ronald Reagan, and more on White House advisors than on the State Department to advise him on international relations; for example, assigning policy related to the Middle East peace process to senior advisor Jared Kushner. Former ExxonMobil CEO Rex Tillerson was Trump's first secretary of state, appointed for his experience and contacts in many other countries, particularly Russia. During Tillerson's tenure at the State Department, budget cuts and Trump's reliance on White House advisors led to media reports that the State Department had been noticeably "sidelined". Former CIA director Mike Pompeo succeeded Tillerson as Secretary of State in April 2018.

As part of the "America First" policy, Trump's administration reevaluated many of the U.S.'s prior multinational commitments, including withdrawing from the Trans-Pacific Partnership, the INF Treaty, the UNHRC and UNESCO, and the Paris Agreement, and urging NATO allies to increase financial burden sharing. The Trump administration introduced a ban on travel from certain Muslim-majority countries and recognized Jerusalem as the capital of Israel. He sought rapprochement with North Korean leader Kim Jong-un as part of efforts to denuclearize the Korean Peninsula, although North Korea continued to expand its nuclear arsenal. Trump withdrew the U.S. from the Iran nuclear deal and increased sanctions against Iran, precipitating several confrontations between the two countries. He increased belligerence against Venezuela and Nicaragua while overseeing drawdowns of U.S. troops from Syria, Iraq, Somalia, and Afghanistan, while agreeing with the Taliban for a conditional full withdrawal from Afghanistan in 2021. He also increased U.S. drone strikes in Africa, and continued the U.S.'s war on terror and campaign against the Islamic State terror organization, including overseeing the death of its leader Abu Bakr al-Baghdadi in October 2019. In January 2020, Trump ordered a drone strike in Iraq which assassinated Iranian major general Qasem Soleimani.

The Trump administration often used economic pressure to enforce its foreign policy goals. Trump's import tariffs agitated trade partners and triggered a trade war with China. He also signed the United States–Mexico–Canada Agreement (USMCA), a continental trade agreement which replaced NAFTA. Trump's administration brokered the Kosovo–Serbia agreement, the Abraham Accords, and subsequent Arab-Israeli normalization agreements with Bahrain, Sudan, and Morocco.

Scholars have offered differing interpretations of Donald Trump's foreign policy. Some have described it as nationalist and populist, highlighting Trump's opposition to the foreign policy establishment, international organizations and migration. Other scholars argue that key themes of Trump's foreign policy - particularly America First and Make America Great Again — draw on ideological narratives associated with fascism, such as themes of national decline and rebirth. According to this view, Trump's rhetoric and policy positions contributed to the normalization and legitimization of exclusionary politics and the justification of hostility or violence toward racialized minorities and political opponents.

== Timeline of notable events ==
=== 2016 ===
In 2020, Trump explained how some of his foreign policy goals became his rationale behind running for office: "I ran for president because I cannot watch this betrayal of our country any longer. I could not sit by as career politicians let other countries take advantage of us on trade, borders, foreign policy and national defense."

In May 2016, Trump campaigned to secure American energy independence for the first time. He drew attention to China's acceptance into the World Trade Organization (WTO) in 2001 as a mistake, claiming the decision had contributed to massive job losses. Consequently, he threatened in 2016 to place tariffs on Chinese products if elected, and post-election he vowed to impose tax penalties on American firms that offshored their companies.

=== 2017 ===
On January 23, 2017, three days after taking office, he withdrew from the Trans-Pacific Partnership, which he deemed a "job killing partnership". Trump announced a preference for bilateral agreements; over the remainder of Trump's term, his administration produced a handful of limited bilateral agreements covering specific products or industries, with limited results. Trump pursued only one general free trade agreement (FTA): the USMCA (with Canada and Mexico), which modified NAFTA. Although the U.S. under Trump eschewed FTAs, the six most important U.S. trading partners continued to negotiate and enter into FTAs, with the U.S. losing ground as a result.

On April 6, 2017, in retaliation for Syrian president Bashar al-Assad's chemical weapon attack, of sarin, against civilians, Trump authorized a limited cruise missile strike on a Syrian air base. After Russia blocked U.S.-sponsored measures against the Syrian regime at the UN Security Council, the U.S. took unilateral action. The attack drew international support and claims it was justified, citing enforcement of the Chemical Weapons Convention (CWC).

On April 27, 2017, the administration reversed the United States-Korea Free Trade Agreement, which Trump described as a "job-killing trade deal" when he was still a presidential candidate.

In April 2017, the administration confronted North Korea and Vice President Pence paid a visit to the DMZ. Tensions increased when Trump asserted in an interview, "If China is not going to solve North Korea, we will." A few months later, in June, he declared a national emergency with respect to North Korea. On June 17, North Korea released American captive Otto Warmbier who was returned to the U.S. in a comatose state and died shortly thereafter.

In May 2017, Trump took his first trip abroad as president, traveling to Saudi Arabia, Israel, the West Bank, Vatican City, Belgium, and Italy. In Brussels, he addressed North Atlantic Treaty Organization (NATO) heads of state and governments, calling on each of them to "finally contribute their fair share" to the alliance. In January 2019, secretary general of NATO Jens Stoltenberg, thanked Trump for being "committed to NATO", professing that he deserved credit for obtaining an additional $100 billion in defense spending for the alliance.

In June 2017, Trump announced that the U.S. would withdraw from the Paris Agreement to combat climate change. The withdrawal left the U.S. as one of the world's only countries outside the Paris Agreement (which consolidated each country's voluntary pledge to reduce carbon emissions and aimed to further emissions cuts), and made the U.S. the sole country to withdraw from the agreement after entering into it. Trump's withdrawal formally abandoned President Obama's goal of cutting U.S. emissions by 28% below 2005 levels by 2025. The U.S. withdrawal formally came into effect on November 4, 2020. Trump's decision to withdrawal from the agreement dismayed business leaders and U.S. allies and was condemned by scientists, which warned that U.S. withdrawal would deepen the climate crisis. Joe Biden, Trump's successor, re-entered the U.S. into the Paris Agreement on February 19, 2021.

On December 6, 2017, Trump officially recognized Jerusalem as the capital of Israel and started the process of relocating the U.S. embassy to Jerusalem.

=== 2018 ===
In March 2018, Trump proposed the creation of an independent space force. Following the decision, he directed the Department of Defense to establish the United States Space Force, a new branch of the Armed Forces. It was signed into law on December 20, 2019.

On May 14, 2018, the Trump administration officially moved the U.S. embassy in Israel from Tel Aviv to Jerusalem.

On May 18, 2018, Trump announced that the United States would withdraw from the Joint Comprehensive Plan of Action, known as the Iran Nuclear Deal. The administration had earlier put Iran "on notice" after they test-fired a missile a few days after Trump took office.

On June 12, 2018, Trump and North Korean leader Kim Jong-un met in Singapore. Trump hoped their rapport would prompt the ending of North Korea's nuclear program. Trump used "flattery, cajolery and even a slickly produced promotional video" in an attempt to persuade Kim into a peace partnership. Trump also gave Kim certain concessions, including ending military drills between the United States and South Korea, a decision that surprised both South Korea and the Pentagon.

On June 19, 2018, U.N. ambassador Nikki Haley announced that the United States would withdraw from the Human Rights Council. She cited the council's "chronic bias against Israel" and the human rights abuses of various sitting members, including China and Venezuela.

On July 16, 2018, Trump and Russian president Vladimir Putin met in Helsinki for a two-hour meeting to discuss the Syrian civil war, the Intermediate-Range Nuclear Forces Treaty, and Russia's encroachment on Ukraine.

In September 2018, the U.S., Mexico, and Canada reached an agreement to replace NAFTA with the United States–Mexico–Canada Agreement (USMCA). During his 2016 campaign, Trump condemned the North American Free Trade Agreement (NAFTA), declaring that if elected to the presidency, "We will either renegotiate it, or we will break it."

In December 2018, Trump announced that the United States would withdraw all of the more than two thousand troops deployed in Syria, and asked the Pentagon to come up with a plan to withdraw half of those serving in Afghanistan as well.

=== 2019 ===
In the aftermath of the November 2015 Paris attacks committed by ISIL, Trump reiterated his intention to eliminate ISIL. By August 2017, the Trump administration had "dramatically accelerated" the U.S.–led campaign against ISIL and recaptured almost one-third of the territory they had taken. On March 23, 2019, Trump administration officials and allies cautiously hailed the territorial collapse of the Islamic State in Syria. The administration emphasized the need to continue applying pressure by maintaining a presence in the country, while also blocking a territorial resurgence of the Islamic State.

In May 2019, the "Trade War" with China took a turn for the worse. Trade talks broke down and the United States raised tariffs on $200 billion worth of Chinese goods; China reciprocated. The Trump administration also imposed new restrictions on Chinese telecom firms, labeled China a currency manipulator, and threatened to halt all private U.S. investment in China.

On June 30, 2019, Trump became the first sitting U.S. president to set foot in North Korea, for a brief meeting with its leader, Kim Jong Un. Kim admitted his surprise at Trump's request to meet, but accepted the offer due to their "excellent relationship" and the significance of meeting to denuclearize the Korean peninsula.

On October 6, 2019, Trump said he would withdraw all remaining U.S. troops from Kurdish-controlled northern Syria. Turkey then invaded Syria to combat the Kurdish groups. The Trump administration responded by placing sanctions on Turkey, although it was a NATO ally.

In 2019, Trump stated that U.S. troops were in Syria "only for oil".

On December 20, 2019, Trump spoke with China's paramount leader Xi Jinping, when China agreed to make "large scale" purchases of U.S. farm goods. They planned to sign a formal agreement on a "phase one trade deal" aimed at eventually ending their 18-month trade war. During their talk, Xi told Trump he was deeply concerned about "negative words and deeds" from the U.S. regarding Taiwan, Hong Kong, Xinjiang, and Tibet. Along with some tariff relief, China agreed to make various structural changes concerning intellectual property and technology issues. Actual Chinese purchases of American goods during 2020 fell far short of expectations. Ultimately, the phase 1 agreement failed to address any structural aspects of the structural conflicts between the United States and China. The overall U.S. trade deficit worsened, with supply trade diverted from China to higher-cost foreign producers rather than being supplied domestically. Tariffs imposed by the U.S. increased costs of Chinese imports for U.S. consumers and business.

=== 2020 ===
We are restoring the fundamental principles that the job of the American soldier is not to rebuild foreign nations, but defend — and defend strongly –our nation from foreign enemies. We are ending the era of endless wars. In its place is a renewed, clear-eyed focus on defending America's vital interests. It is not the duty of U.S. troops to solve ancient conflicts in faraway lands that many people have never even heard of. We are not the policemen of the world.

— President Trump,
West Point Graduation Ceremony, June 13, 2020

January 2020 saw the outbreak of what would become the worldwide COVID-19 pandemic. On May 29, Trump announced that the U.S. would cease funding of the World Health Organization (WHO) and pull out of the agency, claiming that it had protected China while the coronavirus outbreak there spread to other countries to become a pandemic.

The U.S. signed the Doha Agreement in February 2020, a peace deal with the Taliban that facilitated the withdrawal of U.S. forces from Afghanistan and the official conclusion of the war in Afghanistan.

In 2020, the U.S. brokered agreements that established or reestablished diplomatic and economic relations between Israel and four Muslim nations: the United Arab Emirates, Bahrain, Sudan, and Morocco. The New York Times and the Associated Press described these "Abraham Accords" as one of Trump's main foreign policy achievements. Several of the normalization agreements involved diplomatic incentives offered by the U.S., which took steps to remove Sudan from the U.S.'s state sponsors of terrorism list, to recognize Moroccan sovereignty over the disputed region of Western Sahara, and to sell F-35 stealth fighter jets to the UAE.

The agreements between Israel and the UAE, signed in August 2020, were the first between Israel and an Arab country in 25 years. A normalization agreement between Bahrain and Israel was signed in September 2020, providing for diplomatic relations (exchanging ambassadors and opening embassies), the establishment of direct flights, and cooperation in health care, technology, agriculture, and other mutual industries.

Similar agreements to normalize ties were made between Sudan and Israel in October 2020 (the agreement was for establishment of direct flights; an "end to the state of belligerence"; and direct economic and trade negotiations, with a focus on agriculture, but not full diplomatic relations) and between Israel and Morocco in December 2020.

On September 4, 2020, after U.S.-brokered talks, Serbia and Kosovo signed an economic normalization agreement, which also resulted in Serbia agreeing to move its embassy to Jerusalem, and mutual recognition between Israel and Kosovo. In January, at the urging of European leaders, the U.S. brokered an agreement to restore flights between the capitals of Serbia and Kosovo for the first time in more than two decades.

In October 2020, amid the Second Nagorno Karabakh War opposing Armenian-backed and self-proclaimed Republic of Artsakh to Azerbaijan, the Trump administration has not taken any side, and negotiated ceasefires that were quickly broken on the frontline. However, Secretary of State Mike Pompeo has criticized an alleged Turkish involvement in the conflict. The Trump administration has voiced in favor of a peaceful resolution of the conflict through diplomatic talks.

== Appointments ==
Trump's 2018 foreign policy team

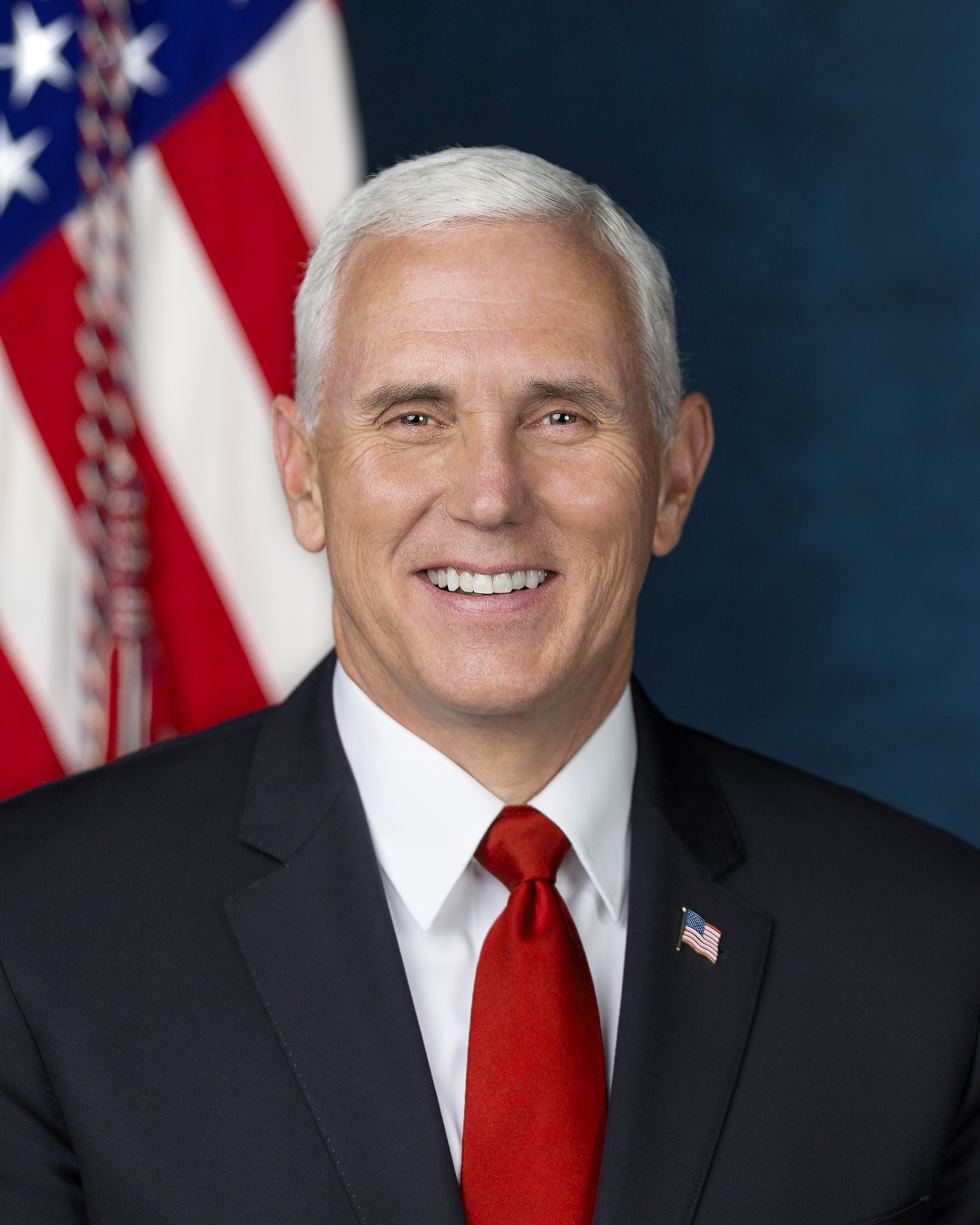
Mike Pence

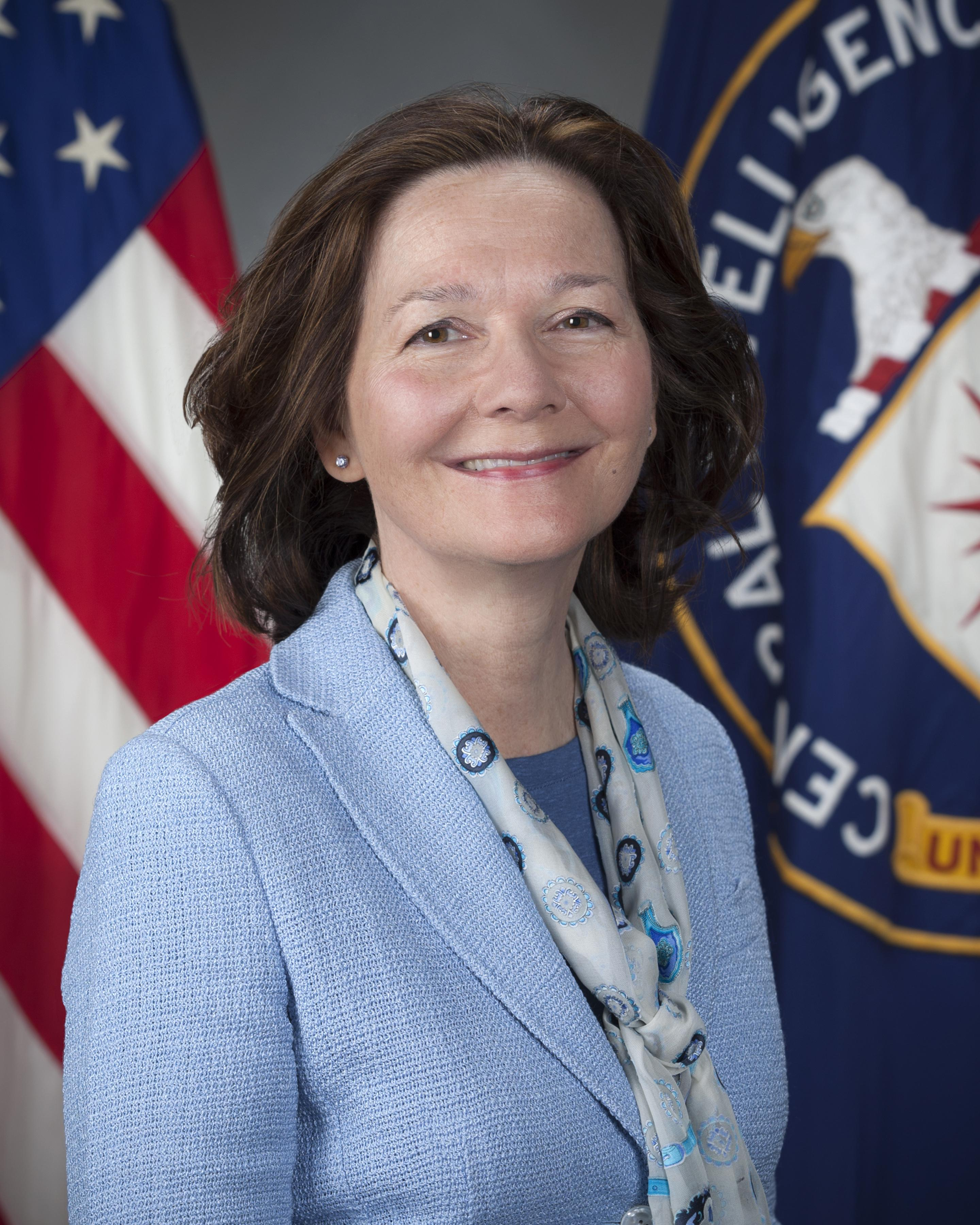
Gina Haspel

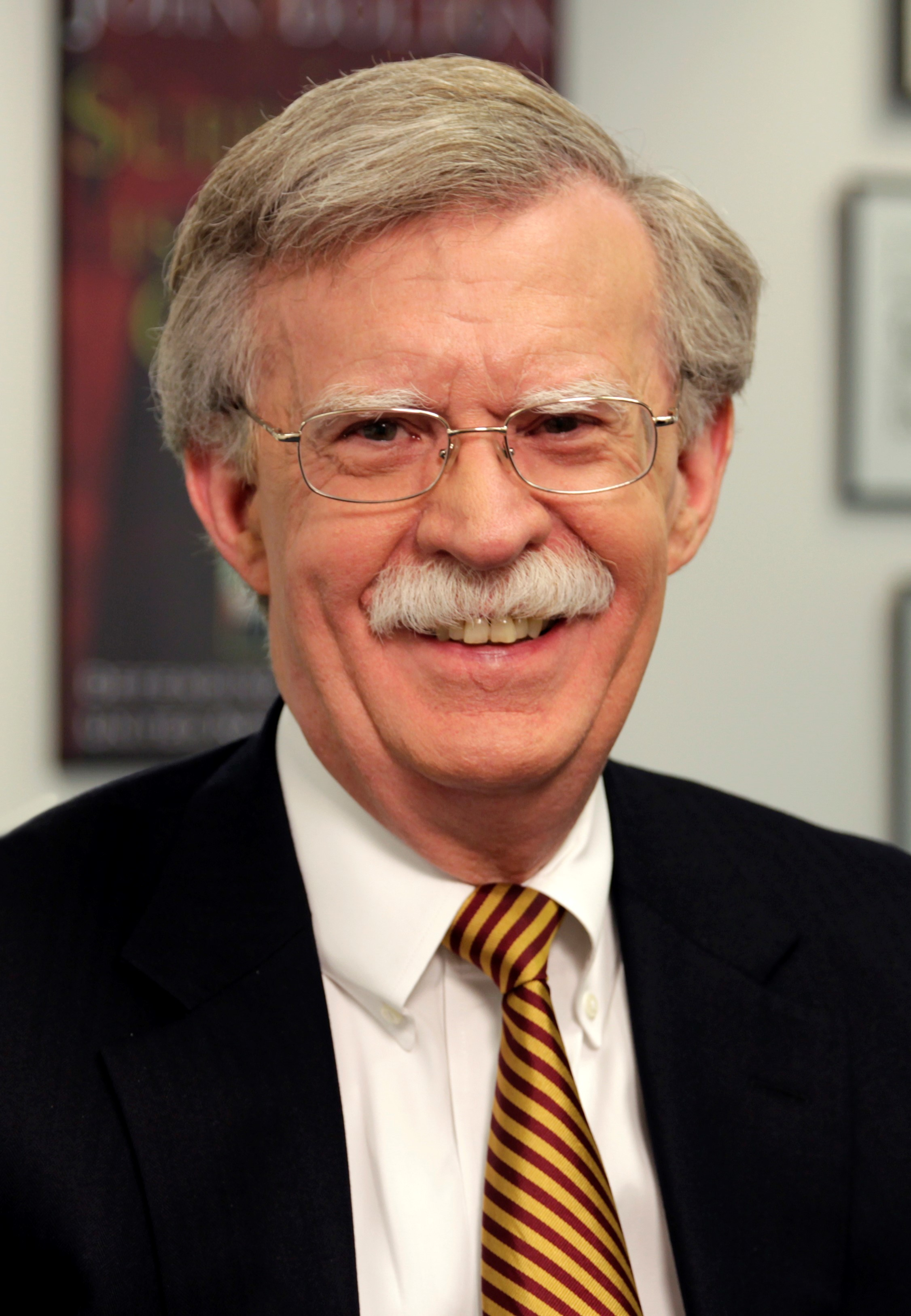
John Bolton

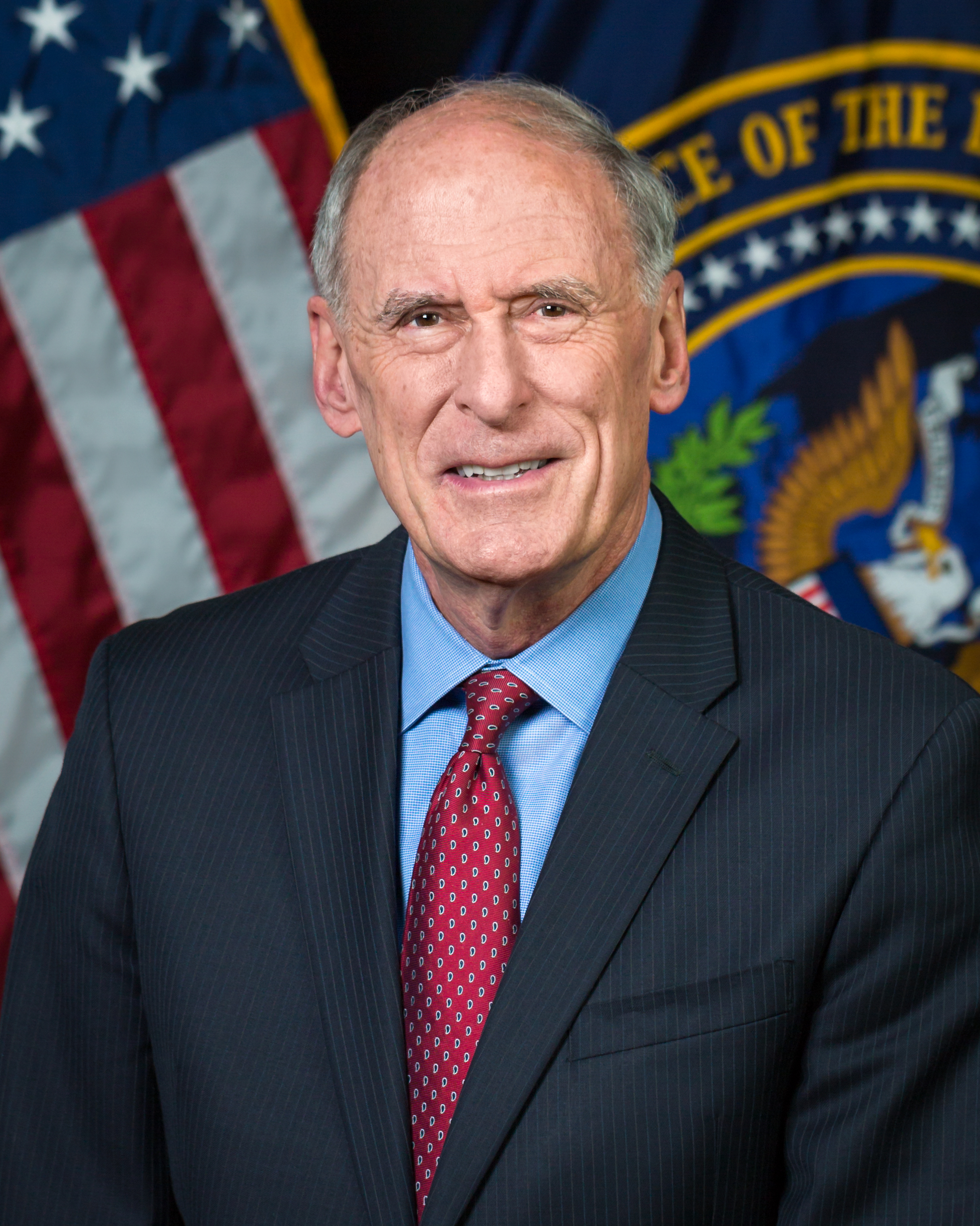
Dan Coats

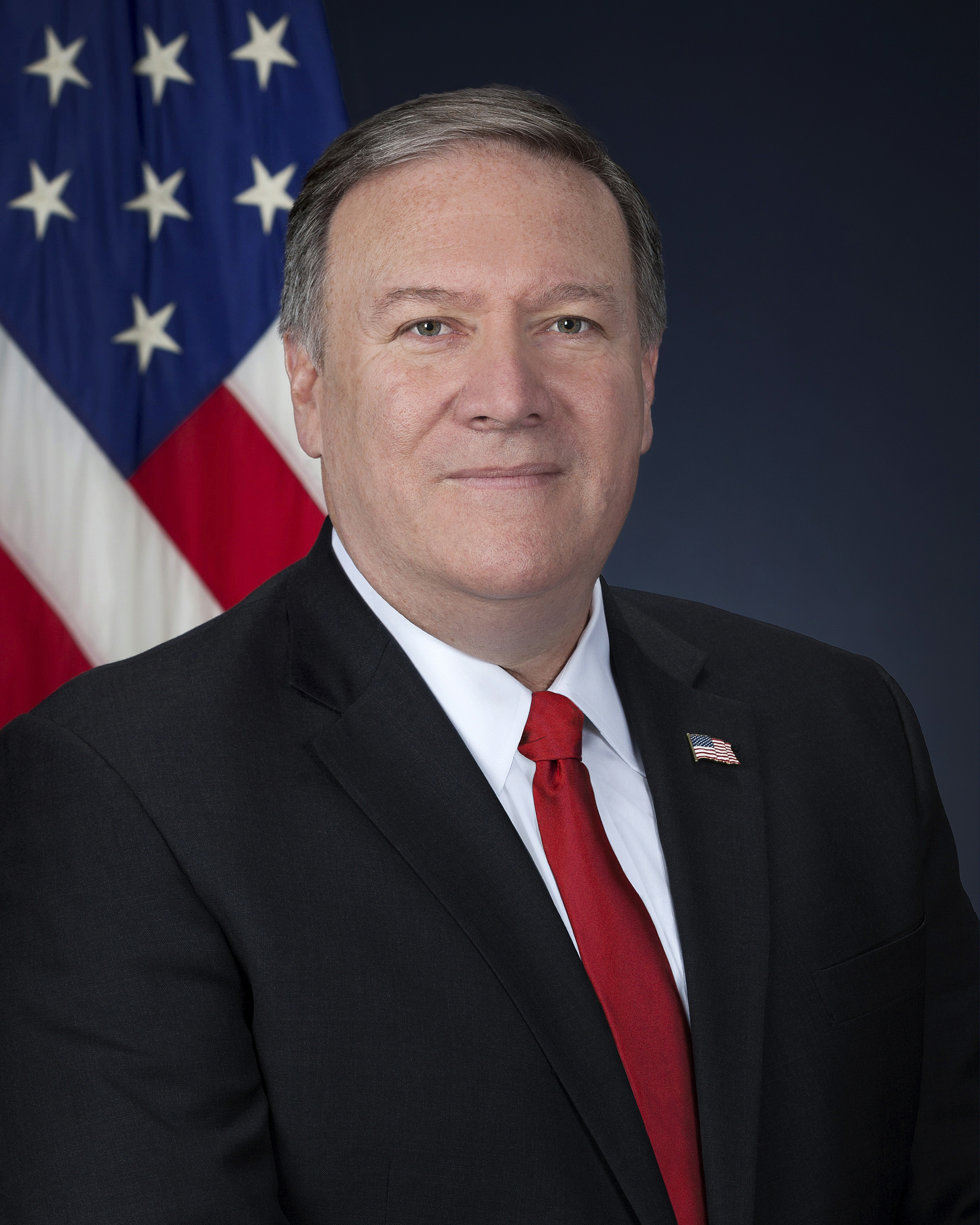
Mike Pompeo

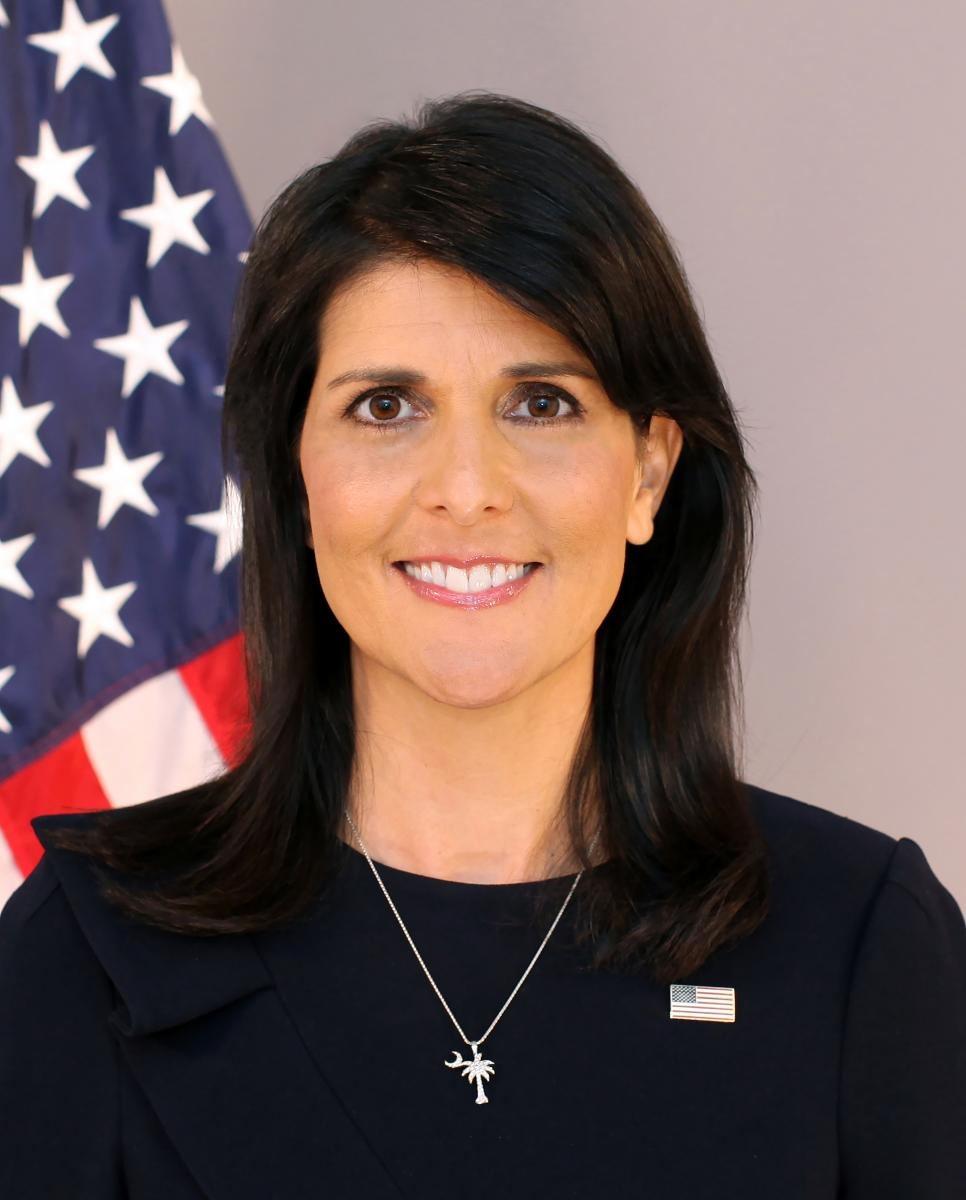
Nikki Haley

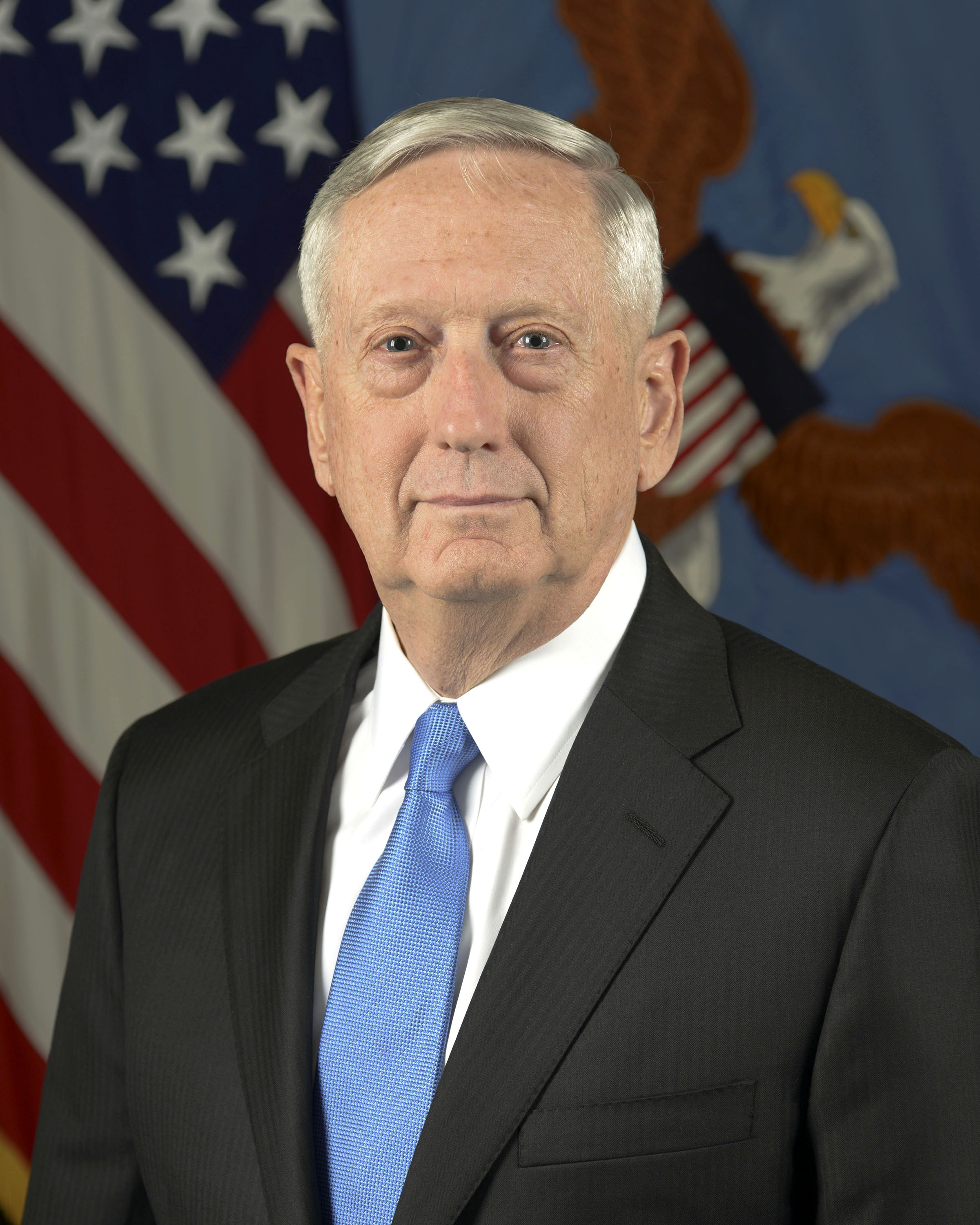
Jim Mattis

First Trump administration Foreign Policy Personnel
Vice President	Pence (2017–2021)						
White House Chief of Staff	Priebus (2017)	Kelly (2017–2019)			Mulvaney (2019–2020)		Meadows (2020–2021)
Secretary of State	Shannon (2017)	Tillerson (2017–2018)		Sullivan (2018)	Pompeo (2018–2021)		
Secretary of Defense	Mattis (2017–2019)		Shanahan (2019)	Esper (2019)	Spencer (2019)	Esper (2019–2020)	Miller (2020–2021)
Ambassador to the United Nations	Sison (2017)	Haley (2017–2018)		Cohen (2019)	Craft (2019–2021)		
Director of National Intelligence	Dempsey (2017)	Coats (2017–2019)		Maguire (2019–2020)		Grenell (2020)	Ratcliffe (2020–2021)
Director of the Central Intelligence Agency	Park (2017)	Pompeo (2017–2018)		Haspel (2018–2021)			
Assistant to the President for National Security Affairs	Flynn (2017)	Kellogg (2017)	McMaster (2017–2018)	Bolton (2018–2019)	Kupperman (2019)	O'Brien (2019–2021)	
Deputy National Security Advisor	McFarland (2017)	Waddell (2017–2018)		Ricardel (2018)	Kupperman (2019)	Pottinger (2019–2021)	
Trade Representative	Pagan (2017)	Vaughn (2017)	Lighthizer (2017–2021)				

Mark Kevin Lloyd, who began his role as the religious freedom adviser at the U.S. Agency for International Development (USAID) on May 26, 2020, has a history of making anti-Muslim statements. Several Muslim civil rights groups objected to his appointment. Lloyd had previously worked for the Trump campaign in Virginia.

Merritt Corrigan, the deputy White House liaison at USAID, was fired on August 3, 2020, the same day she made a series of anti-LGBT tweets. These included her complaint that the US requires other countries to "celebrate sexual deviancy" to qualify for aid. Corrigan had made similar statements in the past.

== Americas ==
On March 3, 2019, National Security Advisor John Bolton invoked the Monroe Doctrine in describing the Trump administration's policy in the Americas, saying "In this administration, we're not afraid to use the word Monroe Doctrine ... It's been the objective of American presidents going back to [President] Ronald Reagan to have a completely democratic hemisphere."

In September 2019, following John Bolton's departure from the administration, Trump claimed that Bolton's views were "not necessarily tougher" than his own: "in some cases, he thought it was too tough what we were doing". Trump claimed that his own views on Cuba and Venezuela were "far stronger" than Bolton's and stated that he was "holding me back". In May 2019, Trump offered a different view of Bolton: "I actually temper John, which is pretty amazing."

=== Argentina ===
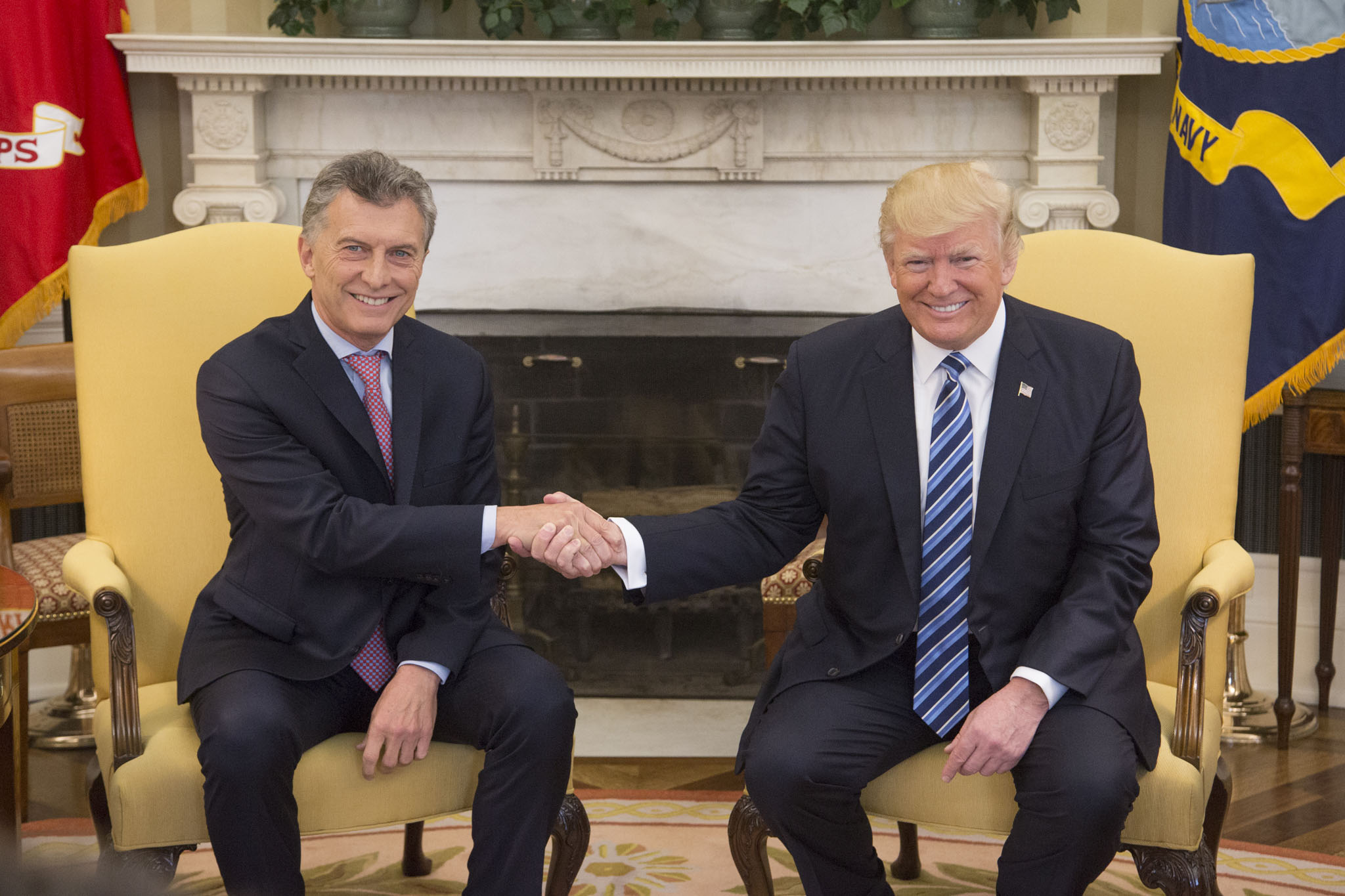
Trump and Argentine President Mauricio Macri, April 2017

President Trump hosted President Mauricio Macri in Washington, D.C. in April 2017. They met at the White House on April 27 to talk about trade. When the ARA San Juan submarine went missing on November 15, 2017, during a routine patrol in the South Atlantic off the coast of Argentina, Trump offered the help of the United States to find the submarine.

=== Brazil ===
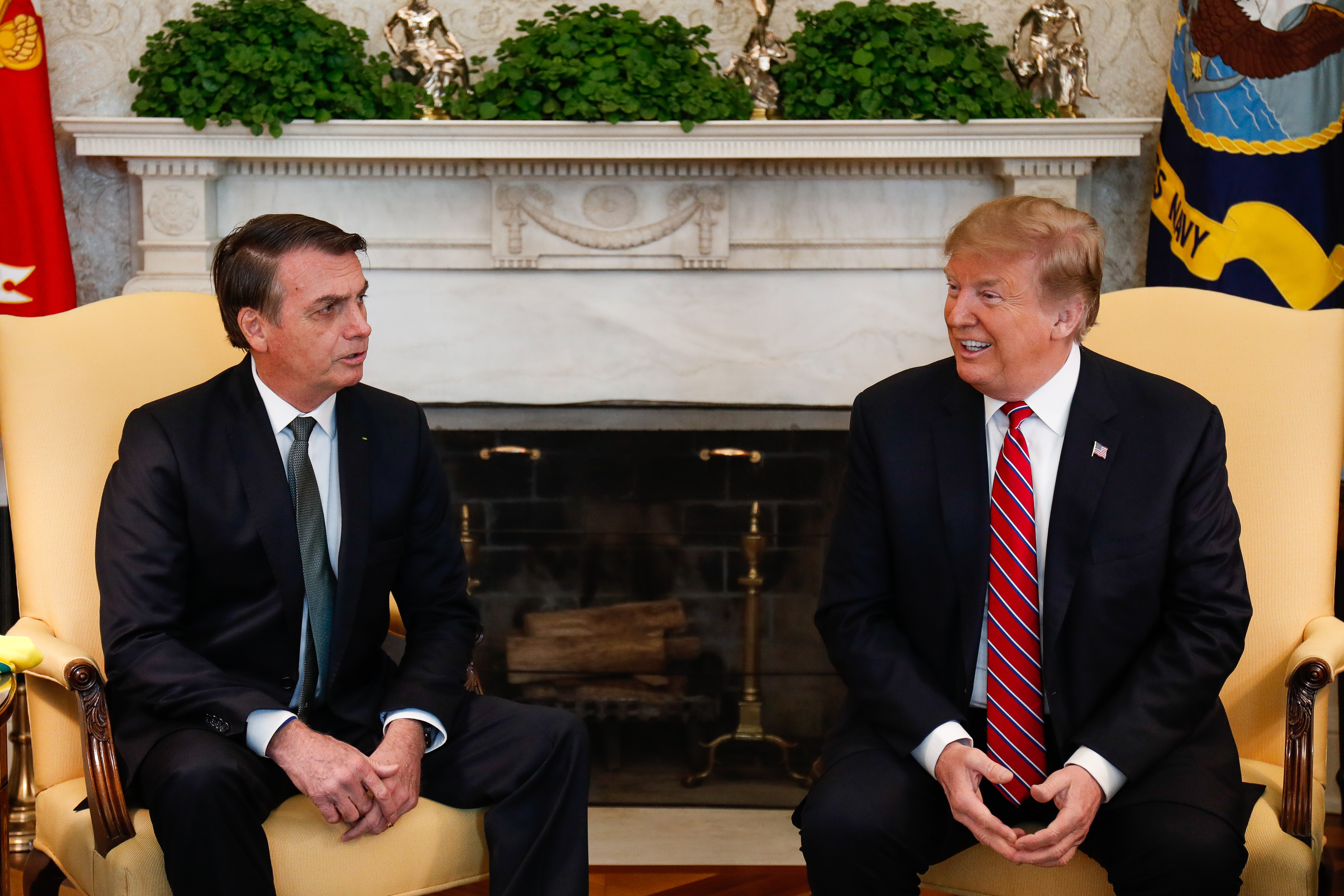
Trump and Brazilian president Jair Bolsonaro, March 2019

The two countries re-approached with the victory of the right-wing president, Jair Bolsonaro, in the 2018 Brazilian general election. On the first official visit of the Brazilian president to the United States in March 2019, Trump announced Brazil as a major non-NATO ally. In May, the U.S. government, through Kimberly Breier, Assistant Secretary of State for Western Hemisphere Affairs, announced formal support for Brazil's entry into the OECD.

=== Canada ===
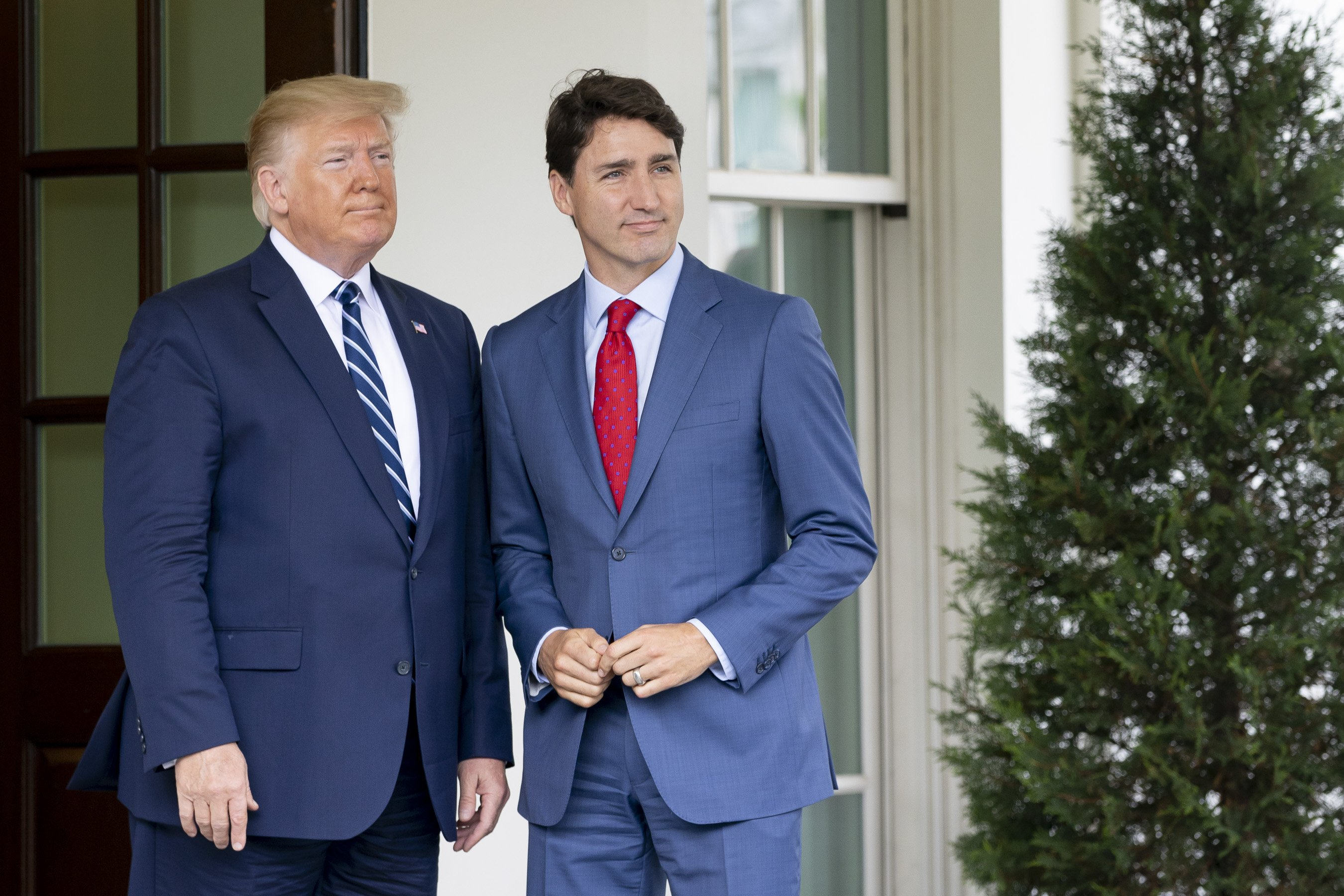
Trump and Canadian prime minister Justin Trudeau, June 2019

On February 13, 2017, Trump met with Canadian prime minister Justin Trudeau at the White House. Trudeau was the third world leader that Trump hosted since his inauguration as president, after the prime ministers Theresa May of the United Kingdom and Shinzo Abe of Japan. At the meeting Trump claimed that he viewed the United States' relationship with Canada as being different from its relationship with Mexico, and said he only foresaw minor adjustments to the Canadian side of NAFTA. At the meeting Trump and Trudeau also discussed increased cooperation at the Canada–United States border, combating opioid abuse, clean energy, and establishing a joint council to promote women in business.

In April 2017, the Trump administration took action on the longstanding Canada–United States softwood lumber dispute, raising the possibility of a trade war. Following Trump's comment that Canada's lumber trade practices are unfair, the United States Department of Commerce announced plans to impose a retroactive duty of 30–40% on Canadian wood shipments to the United States. Canada's minister for trade said, "Canada will not be deterred and will vigorously defend our industry." The Canadian dollar fell to a 14-month low on the announcement.

In June 2018, Trump imposed tariffs with 25% on Canadian steel and 10% on Canadian aluminium. In July 2018, Prime Minister Justin Trudeau imposed retaliatory tariffs with 25% on American steel and 10% on American aluminium.

On June 20, 2019, Trump and Prime Minister Justin Trudeau met and held "positive" talks at the White House on topics regarding ratifying the United States–Mexico–Canada Agreement, the detentions of Huawei CFO Meng Wanzhou and Canadian nationals Michael Spavor and Michael Kovrig, confronting China, and tariff negotiations. Trump called Trudeau a "friend" and, following Trudeau's trip, both Canadian and U.S. officials and media generally considered the talks constructive and helped thaw relations between the two allies, which had noticeably chilled in the early years of Trump's presidency.

=== Caribbean ===
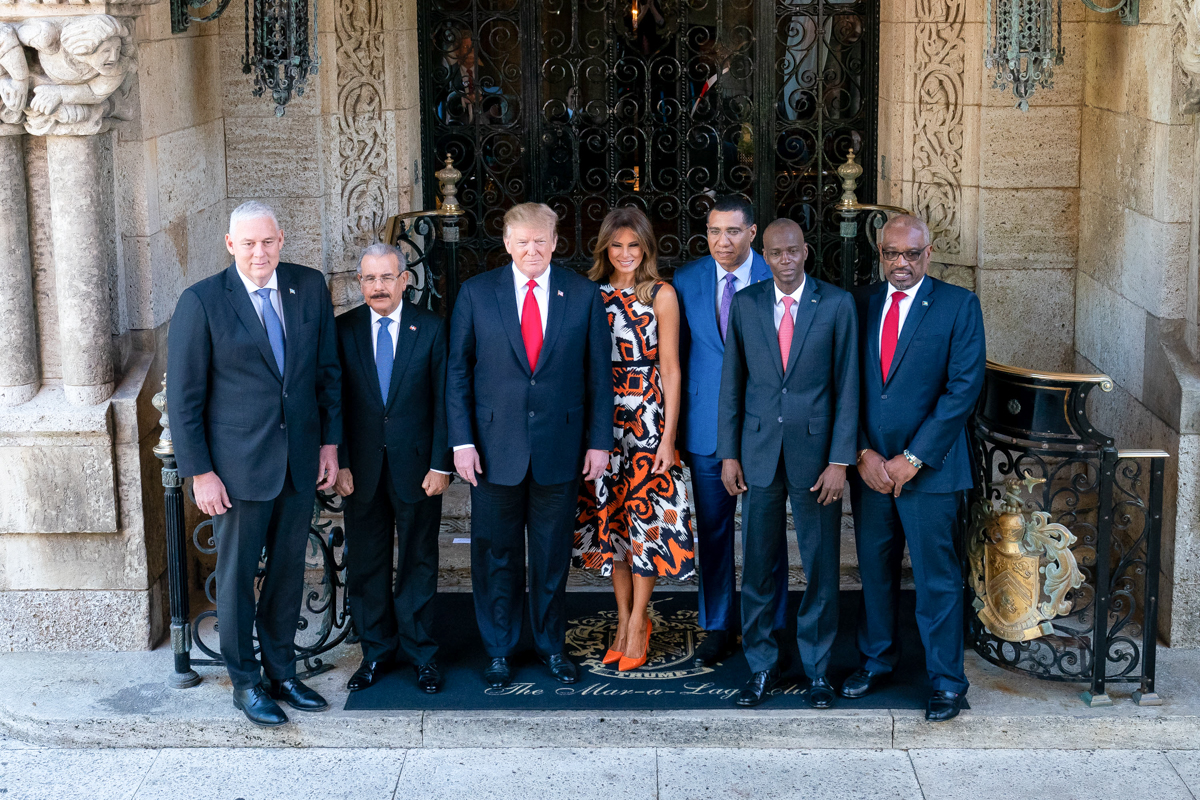
Trump with Caribbean leaders in Palm Beach, Florida, March 2019

During a summer 2017 meeting about immigration, Trump reportedly objected to receiving immigrants from Haiti, reportedly saying "they all have AIDS." The White House denied the report. During a meeting with congressional leaders on January 11, 2018, Trump complained about the number of immigrants from Haiti, saying "Why do we need more Haitians, take them out." He then referred to Haiti and El Salvador, as well as unspecified African nations, as "shithole countries", although specific facts and details about these remarks were disputed.

=== Chile ===
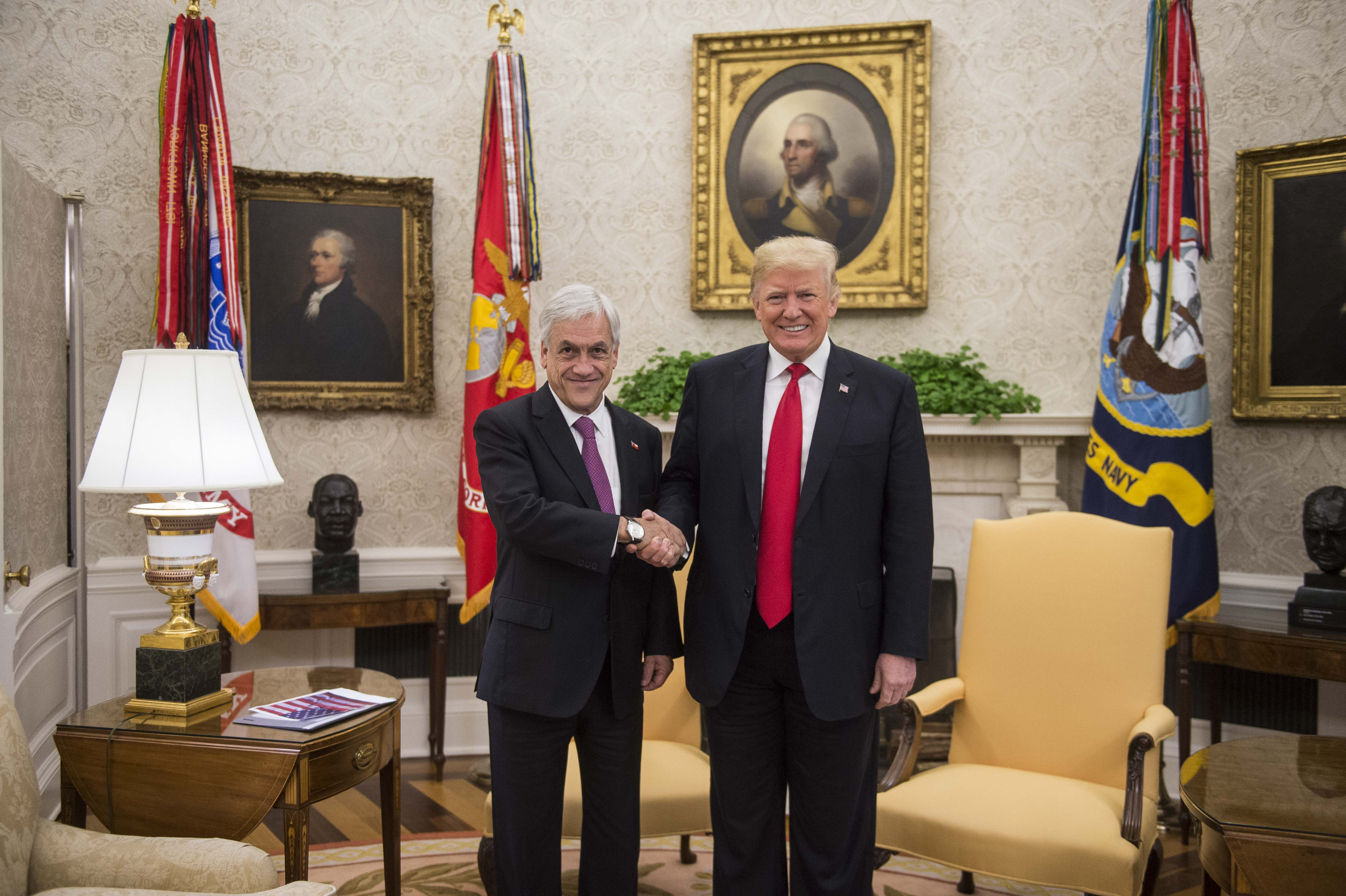
Trump and Chilean president Sebastián Piñera, September 2018

Trump called President Sebastián Piñera in January 2018, months before his return to La Moneda Palace and talked about the Chile–United States Free Trade Agreement, the tax reform approved by the U.S. Senate, the 2017–2018 Iranian protests, and especially on the Crisis in Venezuela.

President Trump hosted President Piñera in Washington, D.C. in September 2018. They met at the White House on September 28. Chile was originally scheduled to host APEC 2019 where Trump planned to sign a trade deal with the People's Republic of China to end a trade war, however the 2019 Chilean protests happened. President Trump called Piñera and denounced "foreign efforts to undermine Chilean institutions, democracy, or society" and called Chile "an important ally, as it works to peacefully restore national order."

Trump insisted on going to Chile before the definitive cancellation of the event saying "I know you have some difficulties at the moment in Chile. But I know the Chileans and I'm sure they'll be able to work it out... We are considering the possibility of getting ahead of schedule to sign a very important part of the agreement with China... much earlier".

In 2020 Piñera and Trump talked about the COVID-19 pandemic.

=== Cuba ===
During the 2016 campaign, Trump expressed his opposition to the restoration of full diplomatic relations between the United States and Cuba achieved in July 2015. Trump said that he would only restore full diplomatic relations with Cuba if the Cuban regime met his demands to restore political freedoms and free political prisoners. This represented a shift from his position expressed in September 2015 when he said that the opening with Cuba was "fine. But we should have made a better deal." Trump also said that he opposed the Cuban Adjustment Act, which allows any Cuban who reaches U.S. soil to remain in the country legally and apply for United States permanent residency.

On June 16, 2017, Trump announced that he was cancelling the Obama administration's previous deals with Cuba, while also expressing hope that a new deal could be negotiated between Cuba and the United States.

On November 1, 2018, National Security Advisor John R. Bolton gave a speech in Miami in which he named Cuba as one of three countries that make up a "troika of tyranny".

On January 12, 2021, Cuba was readded to the State Sponsor of Terrorism list with Secretary of State Mike Pompeo citing "repeatedly providing support for acts of international terrorism" by harboring U.S. fugitives as well as Colombian rebel leaders. Cuba's support for Nicolás Maduro in the presidential crisis, which Pompeo said had allowed the Maduro administration to maintain power and create "a permissive environment for international terrorists to live and thrive within Venezuela", was another reason for the redesignation. The redesignation came just eight days before Trump's presidency ended at noon on January 20.

=== Denmark and Greenland ===
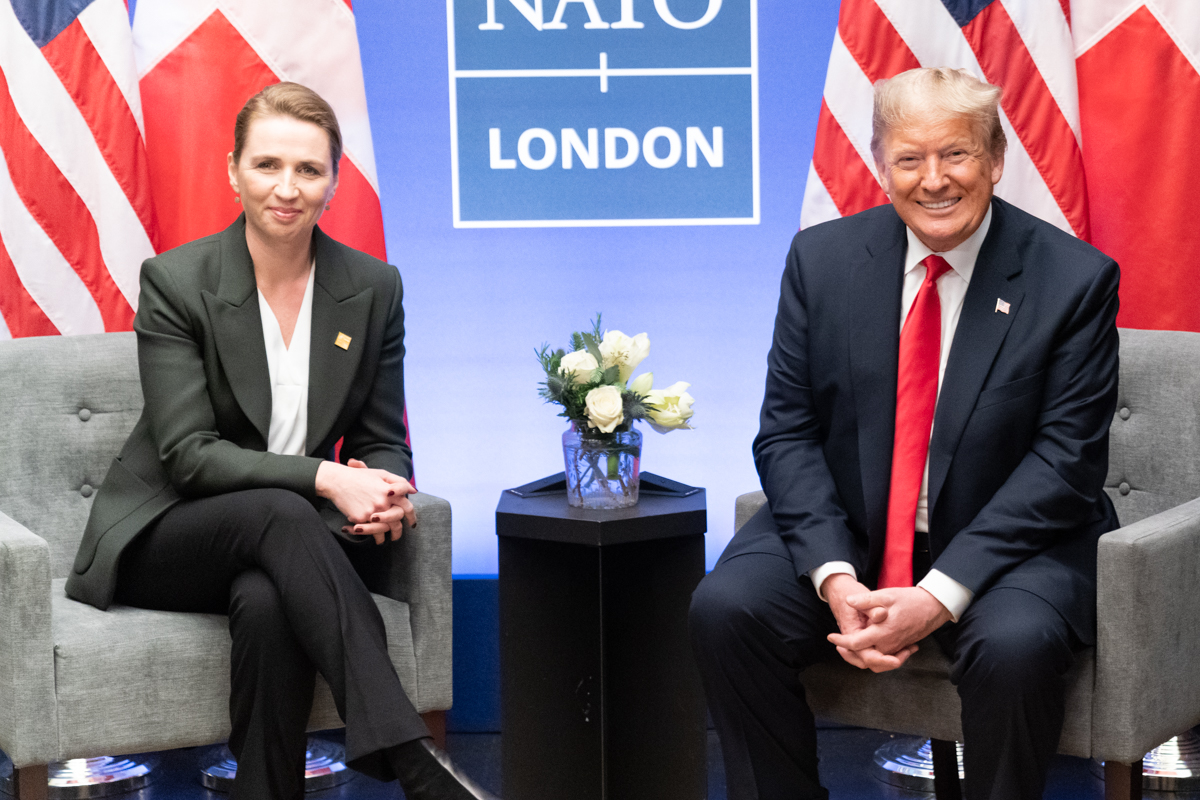
Trump and Danish prime minister Mette Frederiksen at the NATO summit December 2019

In August 2019, Trump expressed interest in buying Greenland from Denmark. In reaction, Greenland's foreign ministry declared that the territory was not for sale. Citing Denmark's reluctance to discuss any purchase, days later Trump canceled a scheduled September trip to Copenhagen.

The Trump administration declared rare-earth minerals to be vital to national security. With Chinese companies investing in mining of Greenland's abundant resources, the U.S. signed in 2019 an agreement to fund an aerial survey of mineral resources in Gardar.

=== Mexico ===
==== During the 2016 campaign ====
During the campaign Trump emphasized U.S. border security and illegal immigration as signature issues. He falsely stated, "When Mexico sends its people, they're not sending their best. .... They're bringing drugs. They're bringing crime. Their rapists. And some, I assume, are good people." He also talked about drugs and infectious diseases "pouring across the border".

In campaign speeches Trump repeatedly and falsely pledged to build a wall along the U.S.'s southern border, saying that Mexico would pay for its construction through increased border-crossing fees and NAFTA tariffs. Trump said his proposed wall would be "a real wall. Not a toy wall like we have now." After a meeting with Mexican president Enrique Peña Nieto on August 31, 2016, Trump said that they "didn't discuss" who would pay for the border wall. Nieto contradicted that later that day, saying that he at the start of the meeting "made it clear that Mexico will not pay for the wall". Later that day, Trump reiterated his position that Mexico will pay to build an "impenetrable" wall on the Southern border.

In 2016 Trump also threatened to impose tariffs — in the range of 15 to 35 percent — on companies that move their operations to Mexico. He specifically criticized the Ford Motor Co., Carrier Corporation, and Mondelez International. And he condemned the North American Free Trade Agreement (NAFTA), saying that if elected president, "We will either renegotiate it, or we will break it."

==== During the administration ====
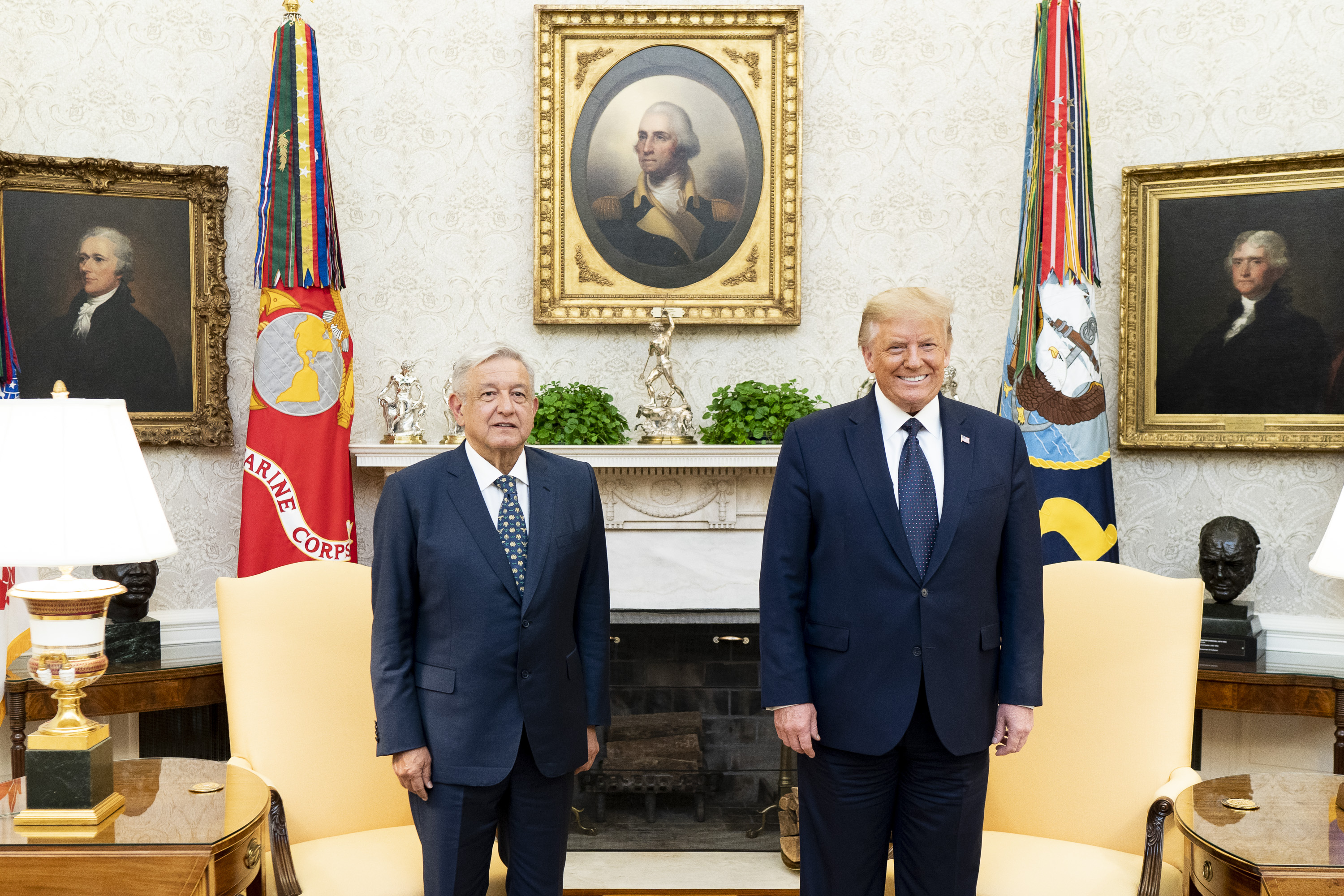
Trump and Mexican president Andrés Manuel López Obrador, July 2020

Trump's rhetoric as a candidate and as president "cranked up the tension in US-Mexico relations to a high not seen in decades". On January 25, 2017, Trump signed an executive order calling for "immediate construction of a physical wall on the southern border". He reiterated that Mexico will eventually pay for the wall. Mexican president Enrique Peña Nieto had been scheduled to meet with Trump at the White House on January 31. However, on January 26 Peña Nieto called off the visit, not citing a reason. The two leaders spoke by telephone on January 27. In statements afterward they acknowledged their differences on the issue and said they intend to work them out, as well as other issues such as security and trade.

Polls also show 5 percent of Mexicans trust Trump's decisions and role in international affairs. The survey by the Pew Research Center said 93 percent of Mexicans had "no confidence in the U.S. president to do the right thing regarding world affairs." The president's decision for a wall along the Mexican border had a proposed 2018 budget that included a request for $1.6 billion (~$2.02 billion in 2025) to begin construction. A November 2017 Quinnipiac University Poll found that 64% of voters oppose building the wall and data showed only 33% supported the idea.

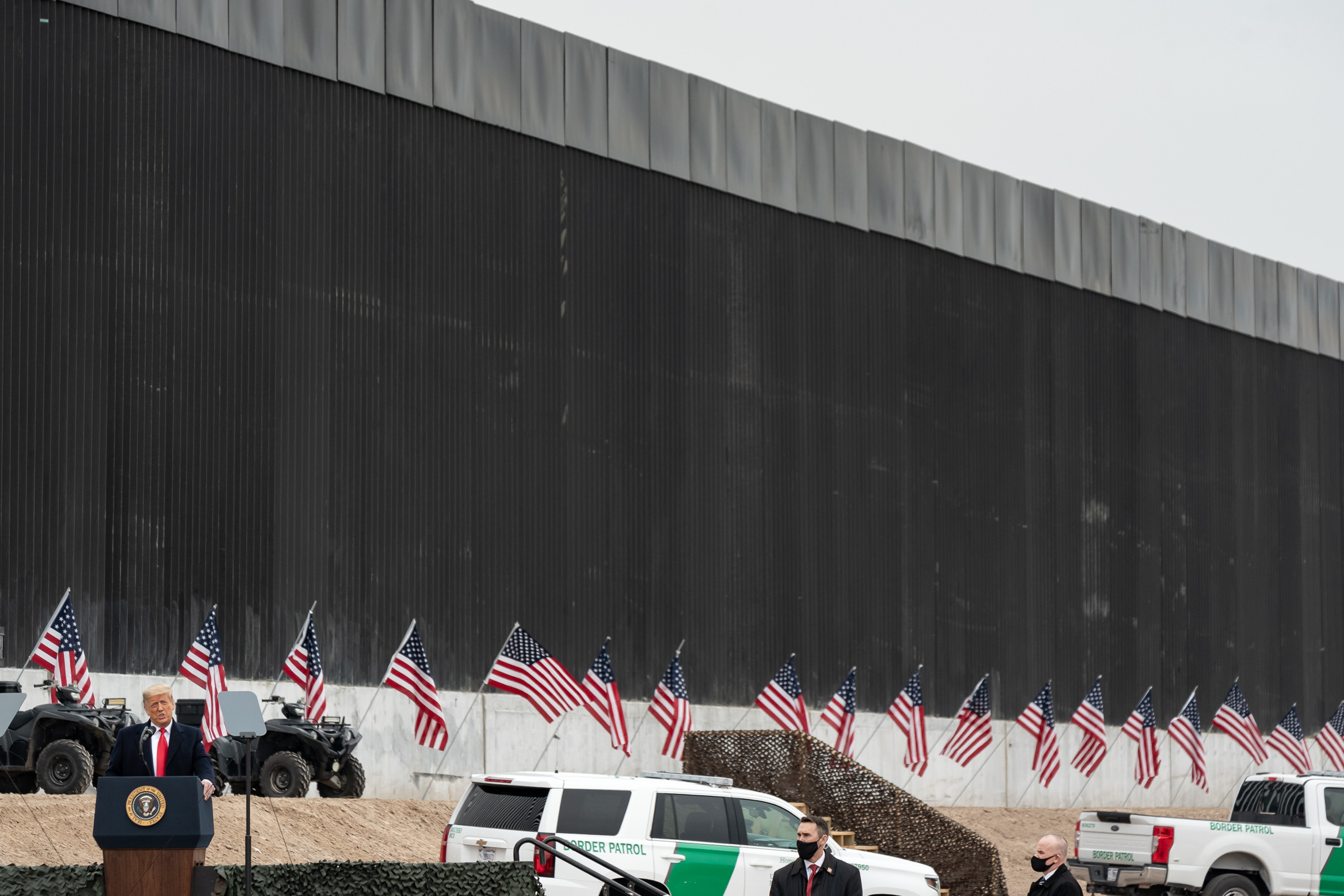
Trump visiting mile 450 of the wall in Alamo, Texas.

Funding for the border wall remained a divisive topic well into 2019, with a partial government shutdown beginning in December 2018 after Trump refused to sign a budget bill that didn't have appropriated funding for the border wall.

However, both countries manage to replace the North American Free Trade Agreement (NAFTA) with the United States–Mexico–Canada Agreement (USMCA) in 2018.

Peña Nieto's successor, Andrés Manuel López Obrador managed to have a cordial relationship with Trump, the latter also offered him his personal treatment against COVID-19 when he contracted it and they had a "pact of silence" on the border wall.

=== Nicaragua ===
Over the course of the civil unrest in Nicaragua that started in April 2018, the Trump administration placed numerous sanctions and condemnations against President Daniel Ortega and his Sandinista government for human rights abuses. The first set of sanctions took place in early July 2018 when under Magnitsky, three top Sandinista officials had their visas revoked. More sanctions and condemnations rolled in after U.S. National Security Advisor John Bolton named Nicaragua as part of a troika of tyranny, including on November 27, 2018, when Trump issued an executive order targeting the first lady and vice president of Nicaragua and her aide Néstor Moncada Lau, and later on December 20, 2018, when Trump signed then-Florida Congresswoman Ileana Ros-Lehtinen's Nicaraguan Investment Conditionality Act (NICA) into law.

On April 17, 2019, the Trump Administration announced sanctions on the Nicaraguan bank BANCORP and on Laureano Ortega Murillo, who is one of President Ortega's sons. After Evo Morales' resignation in Bolivia, Trump issued a statement in reaction that Nicaragua's Daniel Ortega and Venezuela's Nicolás Maduro regimes, both of which he viewed as illegitimate, should be warned.

=== Peru ===
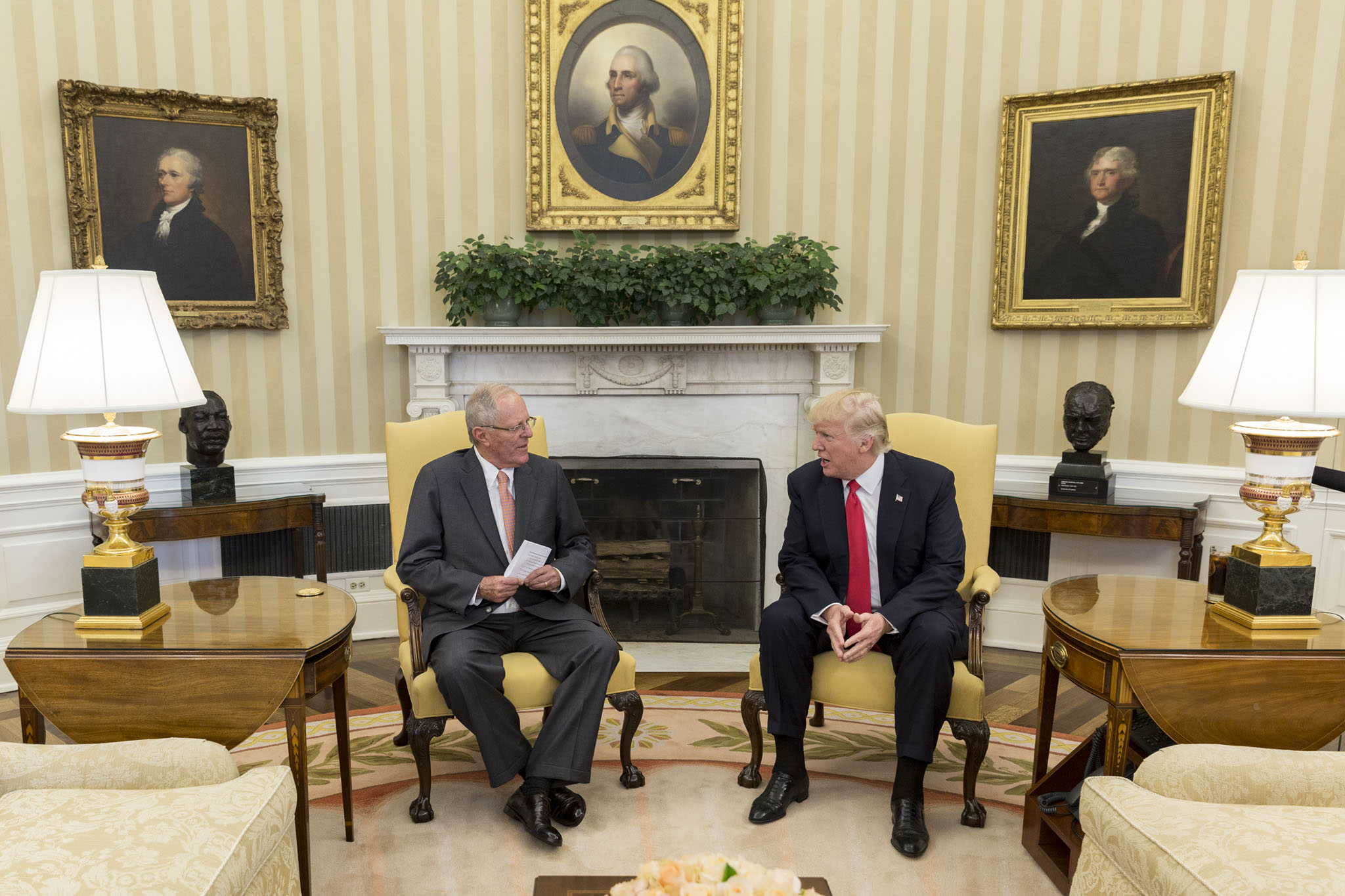
Trump and Peruvian president Pedro Pablo Kuczynski, February 2017

President Trump hosted President Pedro Pablo Kuczynski in Washington, D.C. in February 2017. They met at the White House on February 24 to discuss issues in Latin America. Trump expressed gratitude for Peru's close relations with the United States in protecting interests in Latin America, such as sanctions against Venezuela and corruption probes. Kuczynski brought up a minor purchase of military equipment from the United States for Peru. Kuczynski later recalled that Trump privately mentioned to Kuczynski that "You don't look a day over 90." Kuczynski was 79 at the time.

=== Venezuela ===
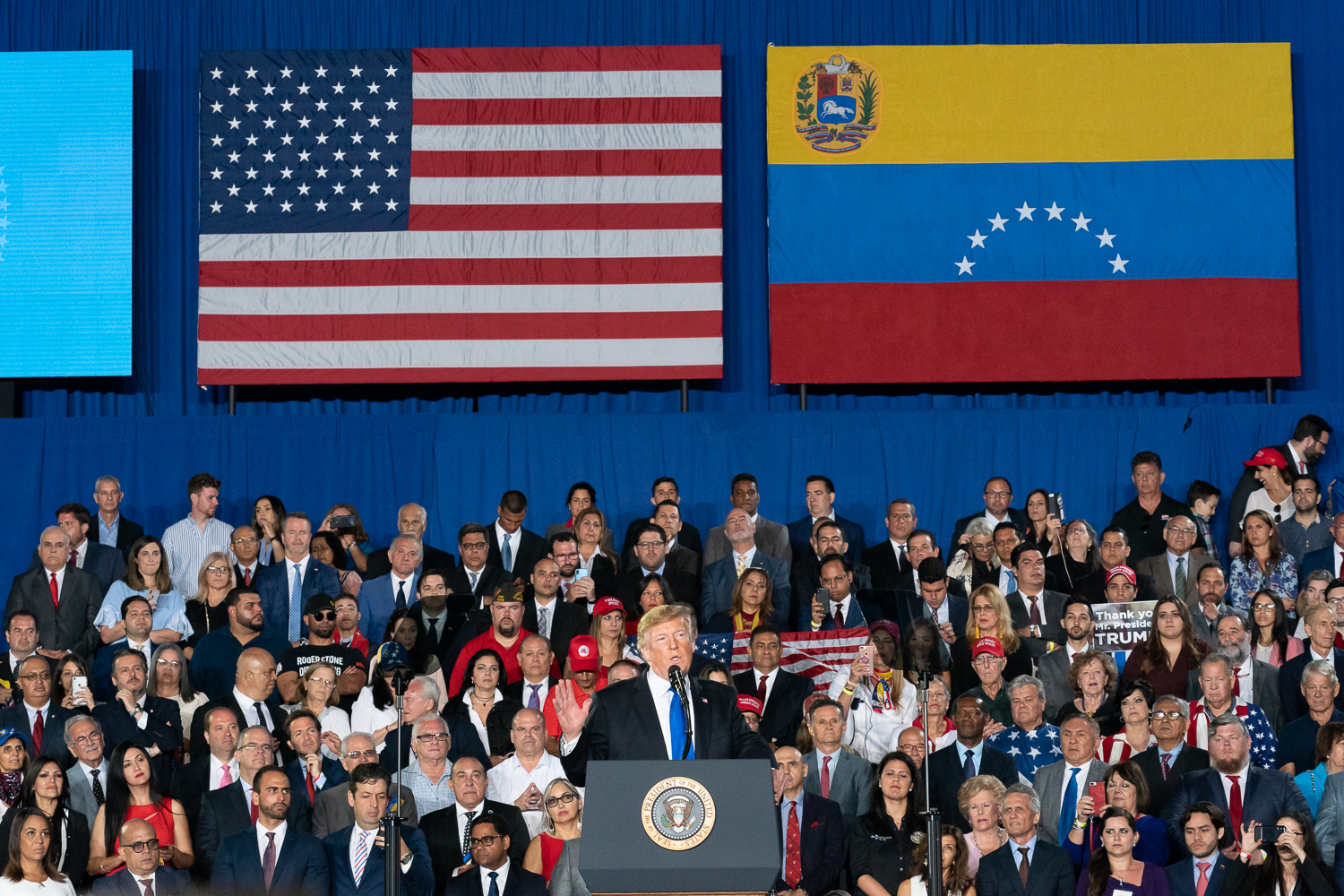
Trump delivers remarks to the Venezuelan American community in Miami, Florida, February 2019

In August 2017, following months of protests in Venezuela against President Nicolás Maduro and the election of a Constituent Assembly which consolidated Maduro's power, the Trump administration described the Venezuelan government as a "dictatorship". Trump further stated on August 11, 2017, a week after the Constituent National Assembly was sworn in, that "Venezuela is not very far away and the people are suffering, and they are dying" and that the United States had "many options for Venezuela," including a possible "military option".

At the time, Trump's advisers, including then-United States National Security Advisor H. R. McMaster, strongly discouraging Trump from military intervention in Venezuela, explaining that Latin American governments were against foreign intervention in the region, though Trump raised some questions about the option. However, when meeting with Latin American leaders during the seventy-second session of the United Nations General Assembly, Trump discussed possible United States military intervention in Venezuela, to which they all denied the idea.

Following these discussions, the Trump administration instead pursued targeted sanctions against officials within the Venezuelan government.

On January 23, 2019, during the Venezuelan presidential crisis, Venezuela broke ties with the United States following Trump's announcement of recognizing Juan Guaidó, the president of Venezuela's National Assembly, as the interim president of Venezuela. On February 18, 2019, Trump warned members of Venezuela's military to renounce loyalty to Nicolás Maduro. The U.S. continued to show support for Juan Guaidó during the attempted April 30 uprising.

Venezuela is one of the three countries condemned in John Bolton's "Troika of Tyranny" speech in Miami. Trump also issued a warning to Maduro, along with Daniel Ortega of Nicaragua, following the downfall of Evo Morales in Bolivia.

== Asia ==
=== East Asia ===
==== China, Taiwan, and the South China Sea ====
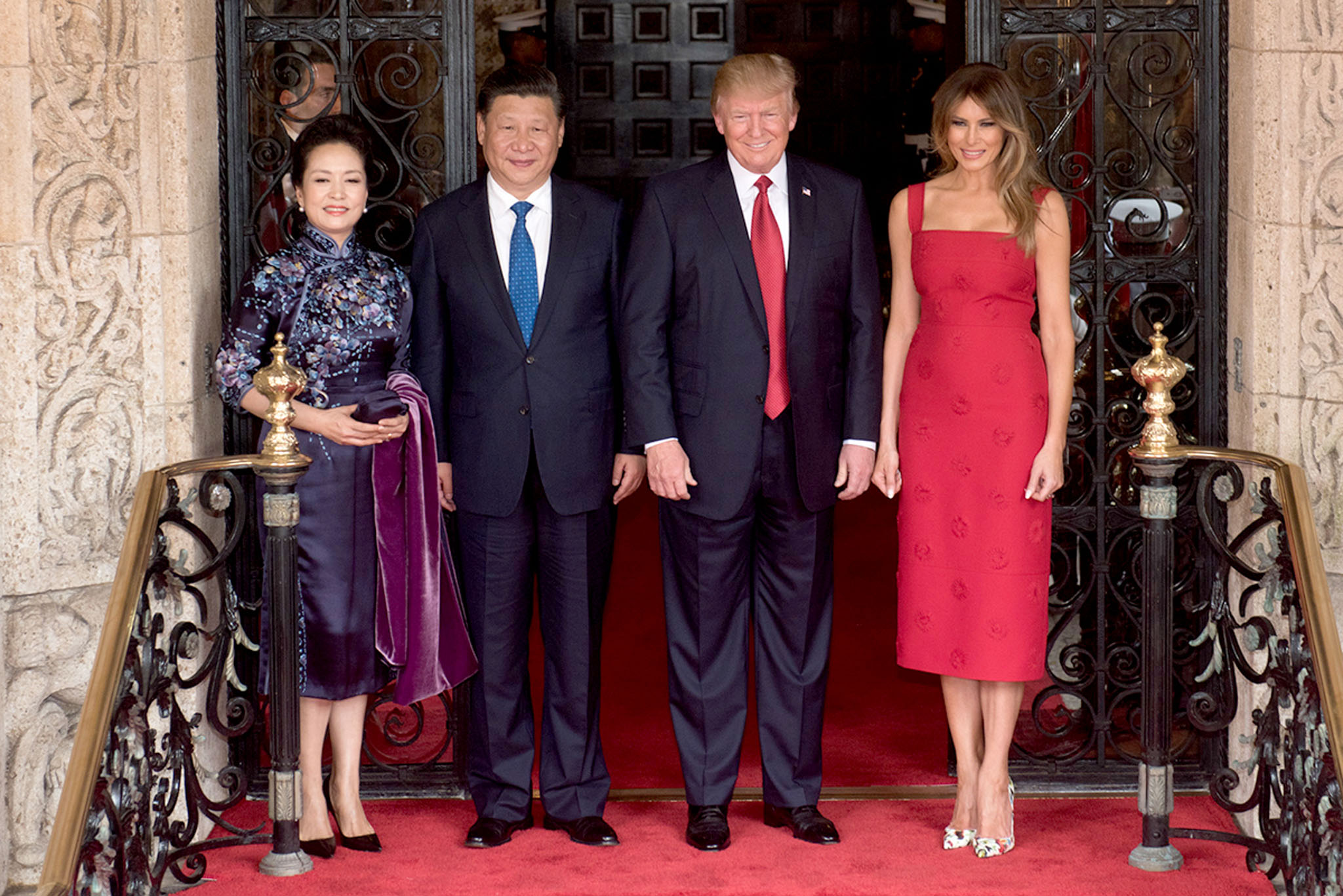
Trump and Chinese leader Xi Jinping with their spouses at Mar-a-Lago during Xi's visit to the United States in April 2017.

Trump's presidency led to a shift in U.S. relations with China.

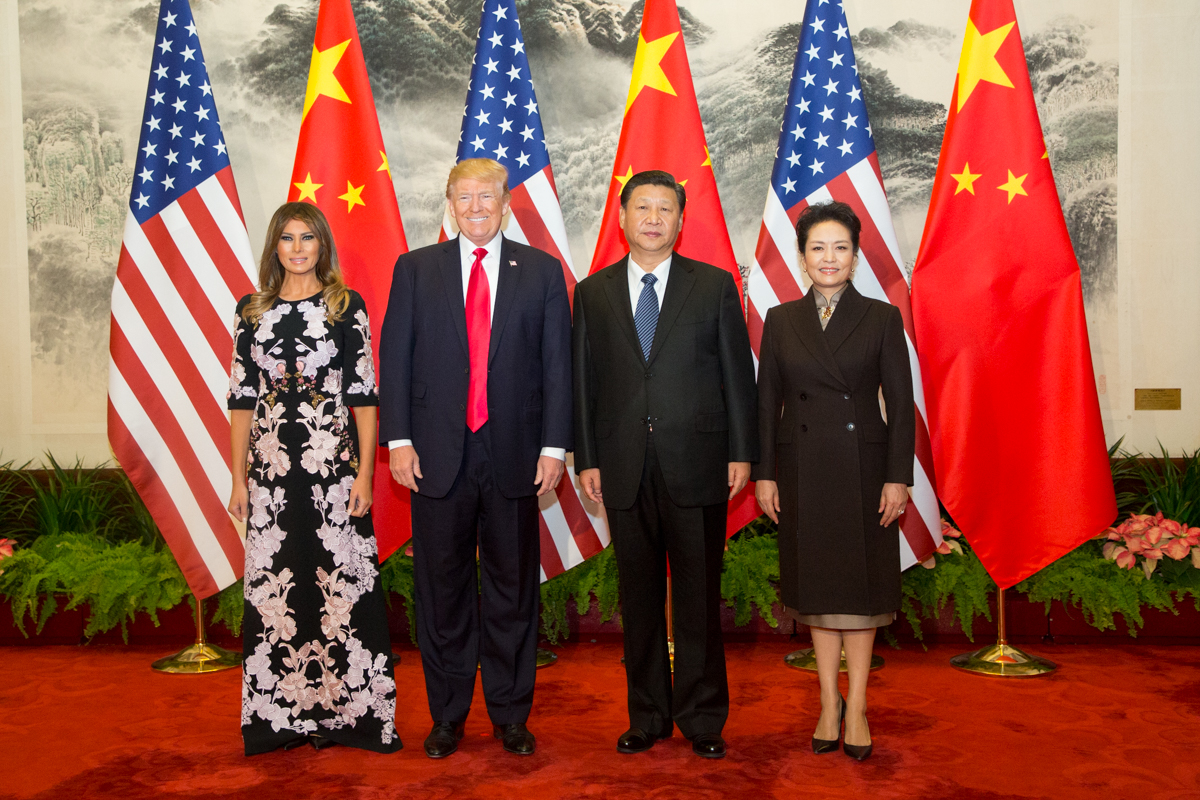
Trump and Chinese leader Xi Jinping with their spouses at the Great Hall of the People during his state visit to China in November 2017.

During the 2016 campaign Trump accused the People's Republic of China (PRC) of currency manipulation. He pledged to carry out "swift, robust and unequivocal" action against Chinese piracy, counterfeit American goods, and theft of U.S. trade secrets and intellectual property. He also condemned China's "illegal export subsidies and lax labor and environmental standards." In January 2016, Trump proposed a 45 percent tariff on Chinese exports to the United States to give "American workers a level playing field." He dismissed possible Chinese reactions, such as sales of U.S. bonds or instituting a trade war, as unlikely and unimportant.

On December 2, 2016, as president-elect, he accepted a congratulatory telephone call from President of the Republic of China (Taiwan) Tsai Ing-wen. That was the first such contact with Taiwan by a U.S. president-elect or president since 1979 and provoked the People's Republic of China to lodge a diplomatic protest ("stern representations"). Trump suggested he did not feel bound by America's traditional 'one China' policy, considering it open to negotiation.

At his confirmation hearing in January 2017, Secretary of State-designate Rex Tillerson expressed strong opposition to the Chinese practice since 2014 of building artificial islands in the South China Sea as a way of claiming sovereignty over it, saying China should be blocked from accessing the islands. Portions of the South China Sea are claimed as territorial waters by multiple nations including the PRC, ROC, Vietnam, Malaysia, Brunei, and the Philippines. On January 23, 2017, White House spokesman Sean Spicer said "It's a question of if [the Spratly Islands] are in fact in international waters and not part of China proper, then yeah, we're going to make sure that we defend international territories from being taken over by one country."

On taking office, the Trump administration stopped negotiations on a bilateral investment treaty with China which had begun in 2008. According to Michael Froman, the lead negotiator during the preceding four years, the effort to reach an agreement was "more than 90 percent complete."

On February 4, 2017, on a visit to Japan, U.S. Defense Secretary James Mattis reaffirmed Washington's commitment under the Treaty of Mutual Cooperation and Security between the United States and Japan to defending Japan, including the Senkaku Islands in the East China Sea that are claimed by China.

On February 9, 2017, Trump reaffirmed American commitment to the One-China policy in a telephone call with Chinese Communist Party general secretary Xi Jinping. The call was described as cordial and as "putting an end to the extended chill" in the relationship between the two countries.

In 2017, the Trump administration terminated the Joint Commission on Commerce and Trade (JCCT) between China and the United States. The JCCT had met annually from 1983 to 2016 and had been a generally effective mechanism to address various trade issues between the two countries. The Trump administration also terminated the Strategic and Economic Dialogue after holding the June 2017 meeting under the name "Comprehensive Economic Dialogue".

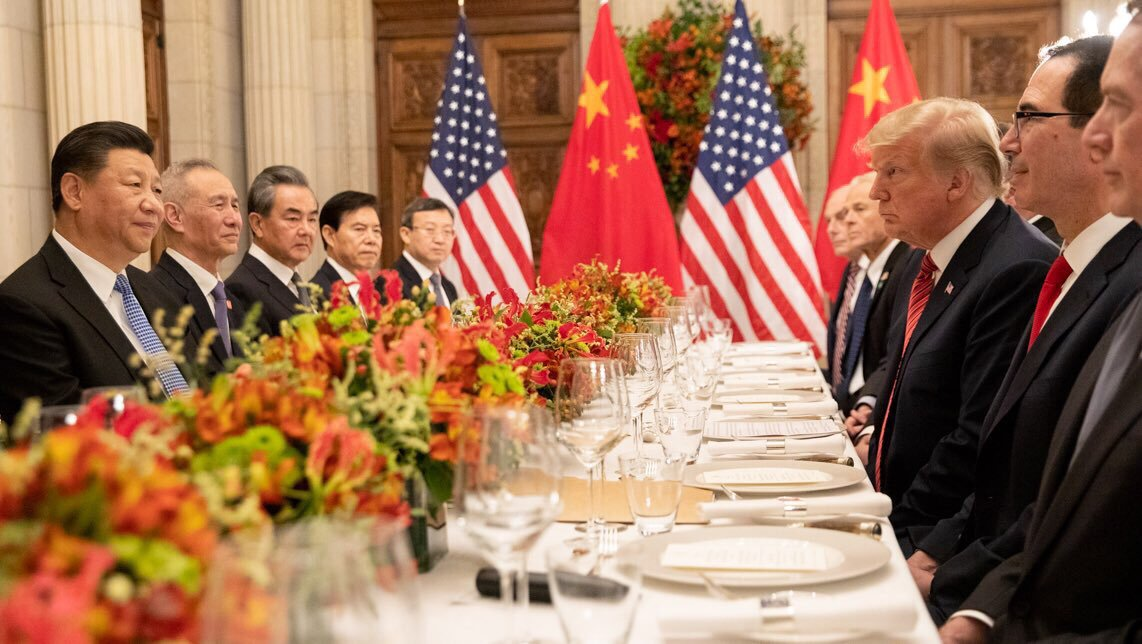
Talks between U.S. delegation headed by Trump and Chinese delegation headed by Xi at the G20 Summit in Buenos Aires, December 2018

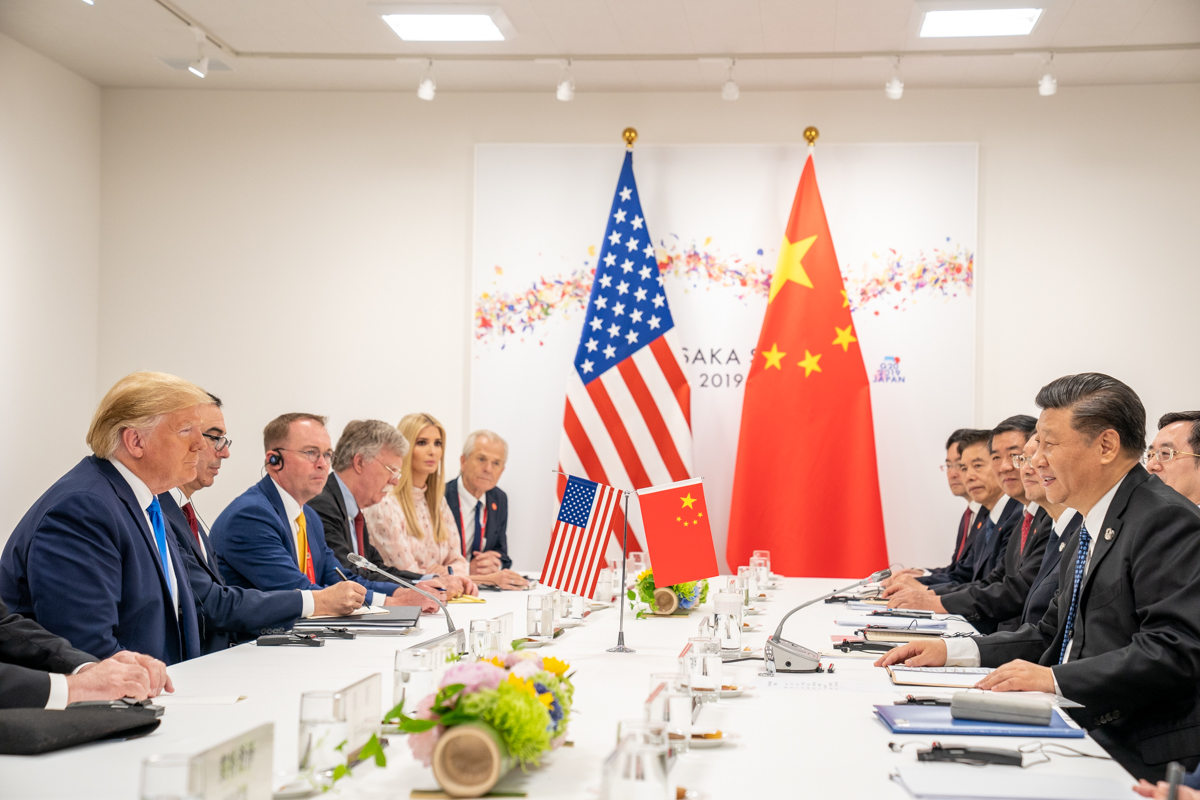
Talks between U.S. delegation headed by Trump and Chinese delegation headed by Xi at the G20 summit in Osaka, June 2019

The relations significantly deteriorated in 2018 and in 2019 when Trump launched a trade war against China, banned US companies from selling equipment to Huawei, increased visa restrictions on Chinese nationality students and scholars and designated China as a "currency manipulator".

According to a report by Reuters, in 2019 the United States CIA began a clandestine campaign on Chinese social media to spread negative narratives about the Xi Jinping administration in an effort to influence Chinese public opinion against the government. The CIA promoted narratives that Communist Party leaders were hiding money overseas and that the Belt and Road Initiative was corrupt and wasteful. As part of the campaign, the CIA also targeted foreign countries where the United States and China compete for influence.

On November 27, 2019, Trump signed the Hong Kong Human Rights and Democracy Act to impose sanctions against Mainland China and Hong Kong officials considered responsible for human rights abuses in Hong Kong The passage of the bill was supported by pro-democracy activists in Hong Kong, and in 2019 received near-unanimous support in Congress.

On January 24, 2020, in the early stages of the COVID-19 pandemic, Trump tweeted that "China has been working very hard to contain the Coronavirus. The United States greatly appreciates their efforts and transparency." Trump later referred to the coronavirus as "Chinese virus". During an April 15 White House news conference, Trump said the U.S. government is trying to determine if the COVID-19 virus emanated from the Wuhan Institute of Virology.

By May 2020 relations had reached a new low as both sides were accusing the other of guilt for the worldwide coronavirus epidemic. Washington mobilized a campaign of investigations, prosecutions and export restrictions. Beijing stepped up military activities in the contested South China Sea, and launched denunciations of American Secretary of State Mike Pompeo. Chinese officials have publicly speculated that the American military deliberately unleashed the virus in China. American polls show the public had increasingly negative views of China.

On June 17, 2020, Trump signed the Uyghur Human Rights Policy Act, which authorizes the imposition of U.S. sanctions against Chinese government officials responsible for re-education camps holding more than 1 million members of the country's Uyghur Muslim minority.

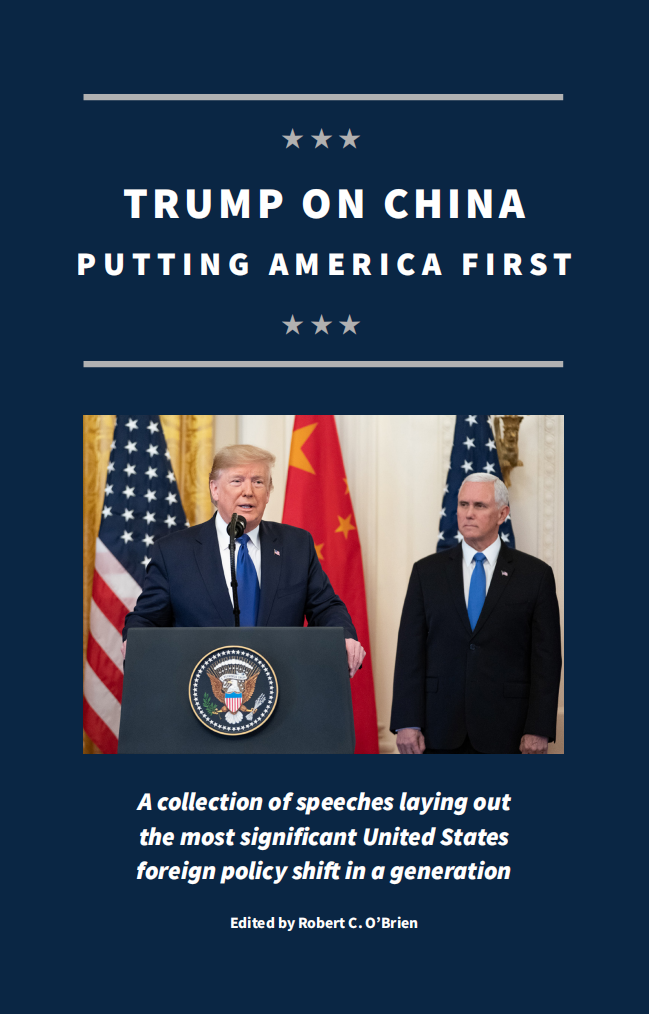
Trump on China: Putting America First (Wikisource), published in November 2020, a collection of speeches laying out Trump's policy on China

On July 9, 2020, the Trump administration imposed sanctions and visa restrictions against senior Chinese officials, including Chen Quanguo, Zhu Hailun, Wang Mingshan (王明山) and Huo Liujun (霍留军). With sanctions, they and their immediate relatives are barred from entering the US and will have US-based assets frozen. The sanction is based on the Uyghur Human Rights Policy Act.

On July 14, 2020, Trump signed the Hong Kong Autonomy Act, which is sanctioning Chinese officials and entities for China's "repressive actions" against the people of Hong Kong, and issued an executive order ending the territory's preferential treatment by the U.S.; The law authorizes the State and Treasury departments to impose sanctions on those involved in imposing the Hong Kong security law, and also targeted banks involved in significant transactions with offenders.

On July 22, 2020, the US government ordered Chinese diplomats to close the Chinese Consulate-General in Houston and vacate within 72 hours, triggering a diplomatic backlash from Chinese officials. Boston College political scientist Robert S. Ross said that the Trump "administration would like to fully decouple from China. No trade, no cultural exchanges, no political exchanges, no cooperation on anything that resembles common interests." Chinese Foreign Ministry spokesman Wang Wenbin issued a statement in response requesting the U.S. to reverse the closure, threatening reciprocal actions otherwise. With the US not backing down on its earlier directive, on July 24, Chinese authorities order the closure of the U.S. Consulate-General in Chengdu. The White House urged China later on that day to not engage in "tit-for-tat retaliation".

On July 23, 2020, United States Secretary of State Mike Pompeo announced the end of what he called "blind engagement" with the Chinese government. He also criticized Chinese Communist Party general secretary Xi Jinping as "a true believer in a bankrupt totalitarian ideology."

In August 2020, Carrie Lam and ten other Hong Kong government officials were sanctioned by the United States Department of the Treasury under an executive order for undermining Hong Kong's autonomy. The sanction is based on the Hong Kong Autonomy Act and Lam would be listed in the Specially Designated Nationals and Blocked Persons List.

On August 9, 2020, U.S. Health and Human Services Secretary Alex Azar visited Taiwan to meet President Tsai Ing-wen, the first visit by an American official since the break in diplomatic relations between Washington and Taipei in 1979.

On August 13, 2020, U.S. Department of State designated the Confucius Institute U.S. Center as a foreign mission of the PRC, "recognizing CIUS for what it is: an entity advancing Beijing's global propaganda and malign influence campaign on U.S. campuses and K-12 classrooms. Confucius Institutes are funded by the PRC and part of the Chinese Communist Party's global influence and propaganda apparatus."

On September 22, 2020, Trump mentioned during the 75th Session of the United Nations General Assembly that "China locked down travel domestically while allowing flights to leave China and infect the world" in regard to COVID-19 pandemic, then he added, "The Chinese government and the World Health Organization — which is virtually controlled by China — falsely declared that there was no evidence of human-to-human transmission." He also accused China that it "dumps millions and millions of tons of plastic and trash into the oceans, overfishes other countries' waters, destroys vast swaths of coral reef, and emits more toxic mercury into the atmosphere than any country anywhere in the world. China's carbon emissions are nearly twice what the U.S."

In December 2020, the New York Times reported that President Trump received uncorroborated intelligence that China had paid bounties to Taliban-linked militants for killing U.S. soldiers in Afghanistan. According to the New York Times it is unclear whether the intelligence on China shows that any bounties were paid, or whether any attacks on American personnel were even attempted. The Times mentioned that United States intelligence agencies collect enormous amounts of information, much of which turns out to be false or misleading.

On January 20, 2021, China imposed sanctions against outgoing US Secretary of State Mike Pompeo, former secretary of health and human services Alex Azar, former under secretary of state Keith J. Krach, outgoing US ambassador to the United Nations Kelly Craft, and 24 other former Trump officials. Biden's National Security Council called the sanctions "unproductive and cynical". In his nomination hearing, Blinken endorsed Pompeo's report that China is committing a genocide against Uyghur Muslims, reaffirming Biden's campaign stance.

Trump's China policies have been largely continued by the subsequent president, Joe Biden.

==== Japan ====
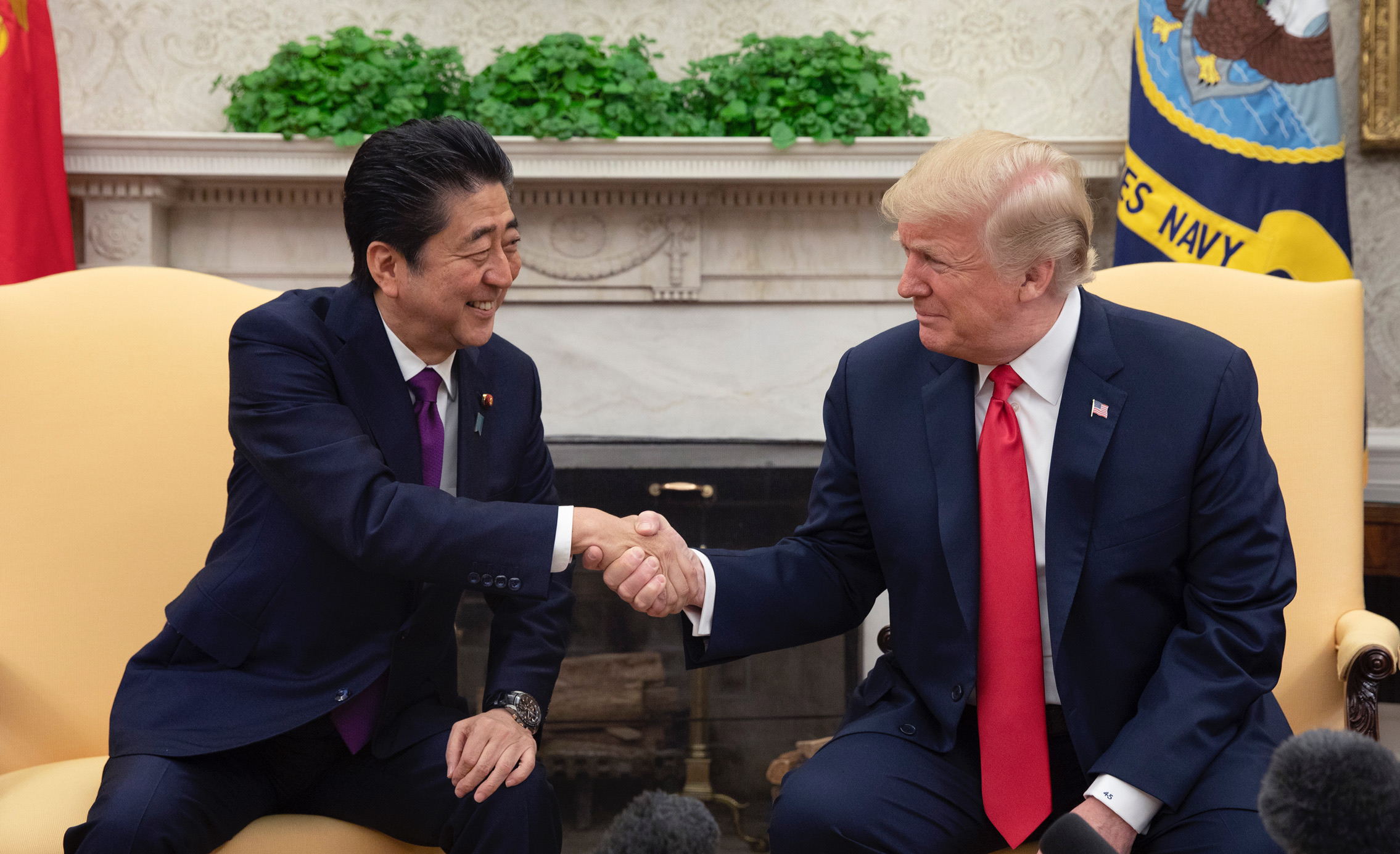
Trump and Japanese prime minister Shinzō Abe, June 2018

During the 2016 election campaign, Trump accused Japan of unfair trade practices, "taking our jobs", and of currency manipulation. He suggested Japan should pay the U.S. for its military presence in Japan, and at one point suggested that Japan should develop nuclear weapons to defend itself against North Korea.

Japanese prime minister Shinzō Abe met with President-elect Trump at Trump Tower shortly after his election victory – the first foreign leader to do so. He said Trump was "a leader in whom I can have confidence". However, after the meeting Trump continued to complain about Japan's currency and its auto industry.

In January 2017, Trump formally renounced the Trans-Pacific Partnership, in which Japan would have been a key player, but left open the option of bilateral trade negotiations.

During a visit to Japan in January 2017, Defense Secretary Mattis reaffirmed that the U.S. was committed to the defense of Japan.

Trump and Abe met at the White House in February 2017, followed by a Florida golf excursion. Trump promised to strengthen ties between the two nations and said the U.S. is committed to the security of Japan, saying that the alliance between the two countries is "the cornerstone of peace and stability in the Pacific region".

==== North Korea ====
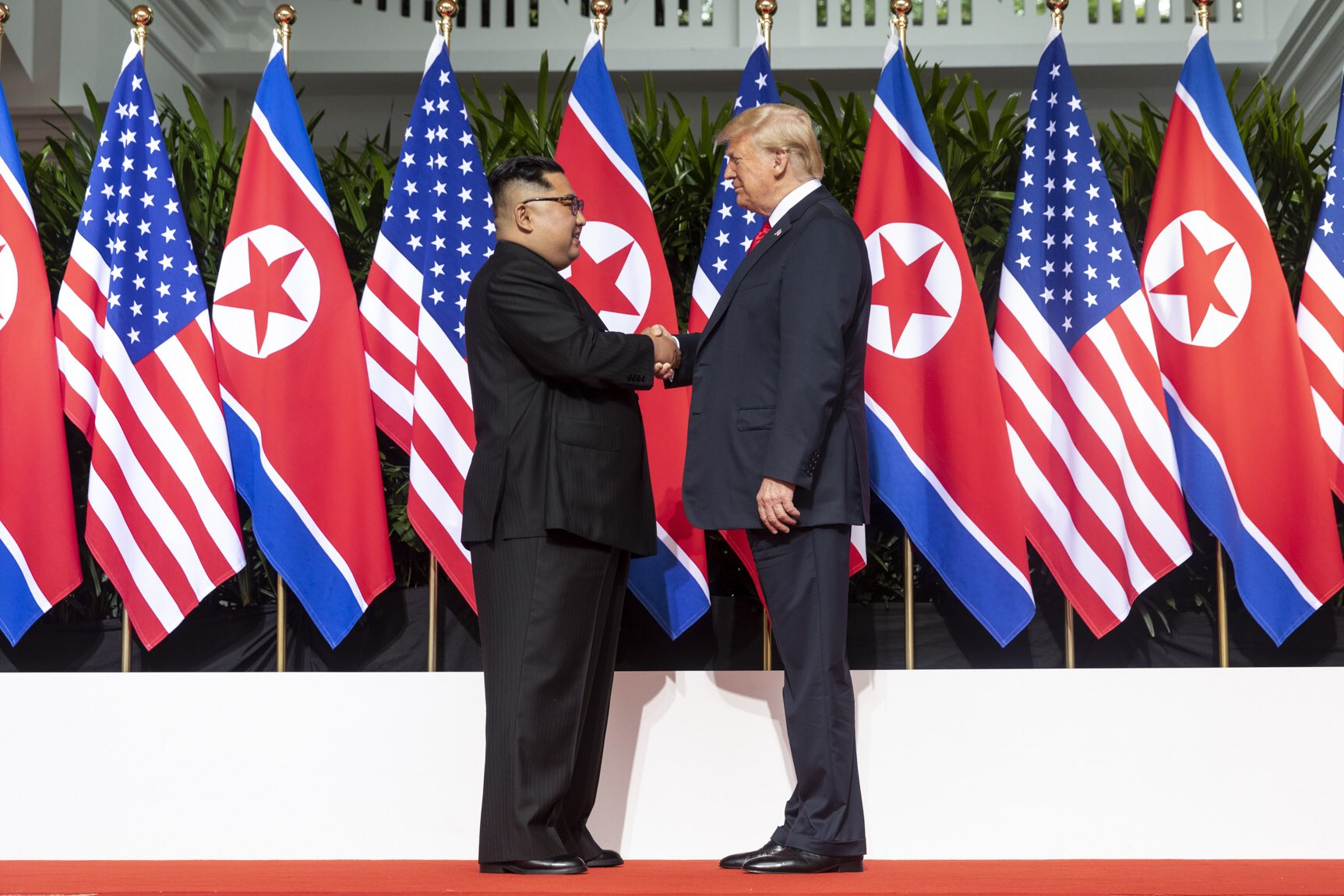
Trump and North Korean Leader Kim Jong Un at the first summit in Singapore, June 2018

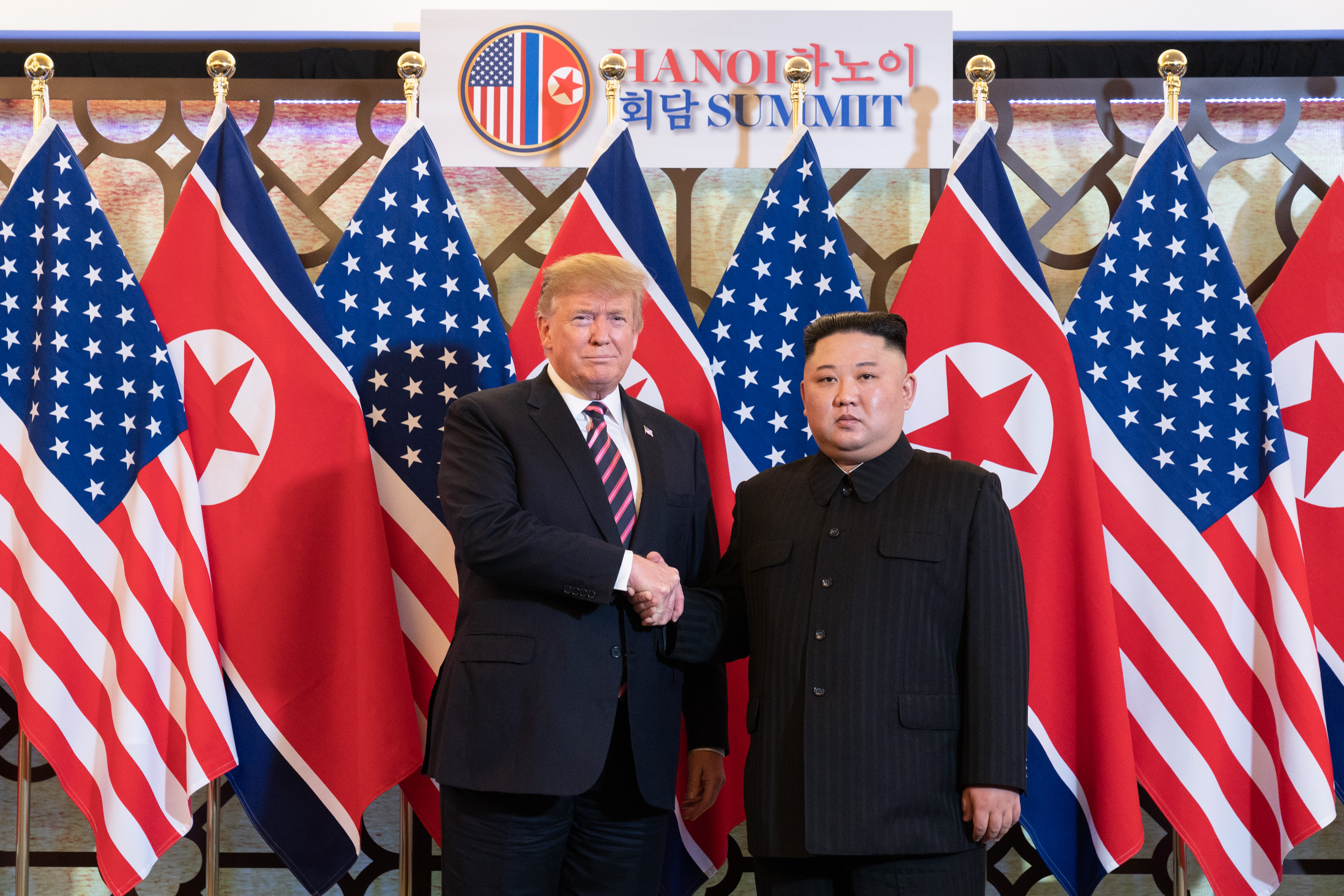
Trump and North Korean Leader Kim Jong Un at the second summit in Hanoi, February 2019

During the 2016 campaign Trump said that he would be willing to meet North Korean supreme leader Kim Jong Un, whom he described as a "maniac" who also deserves credit for being able to overcome his rivals in order to succeed his father. He indicated that he did not want to get involved in any conflict between North and South Korea, an attitude which resulted in an editorial in the North Korean state media that hailed him as a "wise politician" and a "far-sighted presidential candidate" who could be good for North Korea. In the wake of the January 2016 North Korean nuclear test Trump advocated placing greater pressure on China to rein in its ally North Korea. During the campaign and the early months of his presidency, he said he hoped that China would help to rein in North Korea's nuclear ambitions and missile tests.

Tensions increased in April 2017, when speaking before a visit from Chinese leader Xi Jinping, Trump said, "If China is not going to solve North Korea, we will." On April 8, 2017, the US Navy sent a strike group to the Western Pacific from Singapore, which led to the North Korean government warning of a possible war. However, the strike group headed south for scheduled training exercises with the Australian navy but would go to the Korean peninsula the following week. On April 16 Vice President Mike Pence visited South Korea, viewed the Demilitarized Zone which separates North from South Korea, and similarly warned that the U.S. "era of strategic patience" toward North Korea's nuclear and missile programs is over.

Two months later, on June 17, North Korea released American captive Otto Warmbier. Secretary of State Rex Tillerson said that the State Department had secured Warmbier's release at the direction of Trump, and they would seek the release of three other imprisoned Americans in North Korea. (Note: The three detainees, all Korean Americans who had been working in North Korea prior to their arrests, were subsequently released in May 2018 prior to the first North Korea–United States summit.)

In July 2017, North Korea tested two long-range missiles, identified by Western observers as intercontinental ballistic missiles potentially capable of reaching Alaska, Hawaii, and the contiguous United States. In August, Trump significantly escalated his rhetoric against North Korea, saying that further provocation against the U.S. will be met with "fire and fury like the world has never seen." According to New York Times correspondent Michael S. Schmidt, Trump proposed using a nuclear weapon against North Korea and blaming the attack on another country, but was dissuaded by John F. Kelly.

In March 2018, a South Korean delegation to the White House gave Trump a message from Kim, suggesting a meeting between Kim and Trump. The South Koreans said Kim was willing to talk about his nuclear and missile programs. Trump immediately accepted the invitation to meet "at a place and time to be determined."

Regarding the subsequent correspondence from Kim between April 2018 and August 2019, former national security adviser John Bolton believes the letters were written by someone in the "agitprop bureau" and not by Kim himself.

On May 10, it was announced that the meeting would take place on June 12 in Singapore. As a gesture of good will, Kim freed three U.S. citizens being held in North Korean prisons. However, as the time neared, North Korean officials failed to meet with their American counterparts to plan the meeting. On May 24, Trump called off the meeting, citing what he perceived as "tremendous anger and open hostility" in North Korea's most recent statement. A few days later planning for the meeting was resumed.

On June 12, 2018, after several rounds of preliminary staff-level meetings, Trump and Kim met at a hotel in Singapore. They talked one-on-one with only interpreters present, then had a working lunch along with staff and advisors. They signed a joint statement agreeing to new peaceful relations, security guarantees for North Korea, reaffirmation of North Korea's promise to work toward denuclearization of the Korean Peninsula, recovery of soldiers' remains, and follow-up negotiations between high-level officials. At a follow-up press conference, Trump announced that the U.S. will stop holding joint military exercises with South Korea, calling them "provocative". Immediately after the summit, Trump declared, "there is no longer a Nuclear Threat from North Korea."

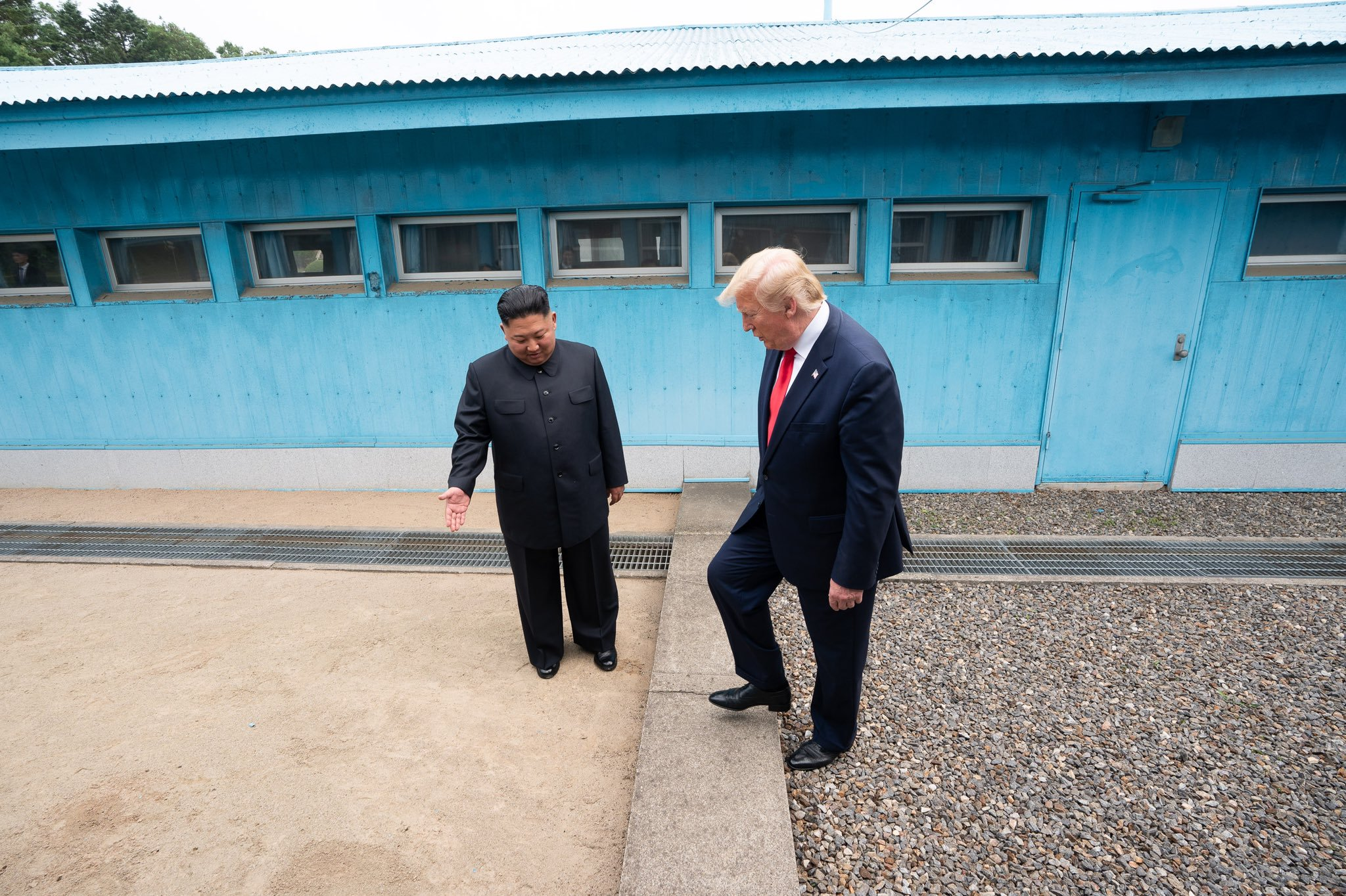
In June 2019, Trump stepped into North Korean territory, becoming the first sitting U.S. president to do so since the Korean War

A January 2019 American intelligence community assessment found that North Korea was unlikely to relinquish its nuclear arsenal, directly contradicting a core tenet of Trump's stated foreign policy.

In late February 2019, Trump met with Chairman Kim Jong-un at a summit in Hanoi for talks. On February 28, the White House announced that the summit was called off after negotiations with the North Koreans failed to reach an agreement.

Following the 2019 G20 Osaka summit, Trump arranged for a meeting with Chairman Kim at the Korean Demilitarized Zone alongside South Korean president Moon Jae-in. The one-day trilateral summit at the DMZ was held on June 30, in which Trump became the first U.S. president to set foot on North Korean soil while in office. Trump and Kim also pledged to jump-start negotiations over North Korea's nuclear program after talks collapsed during the February 2019 Hanoi summit. Subsequent October 2019 talks in Stockholm quickly broke down in recriminations, with the DPRK accusing the United States of a "hostile policy". There were no further known talks between the nations during the Trump presidency. By 2020, North Korea's nuclear arsenal had reportedly increased to levels far larger than it was prior to the 2018 Singapore summit.

==== South Korea ====
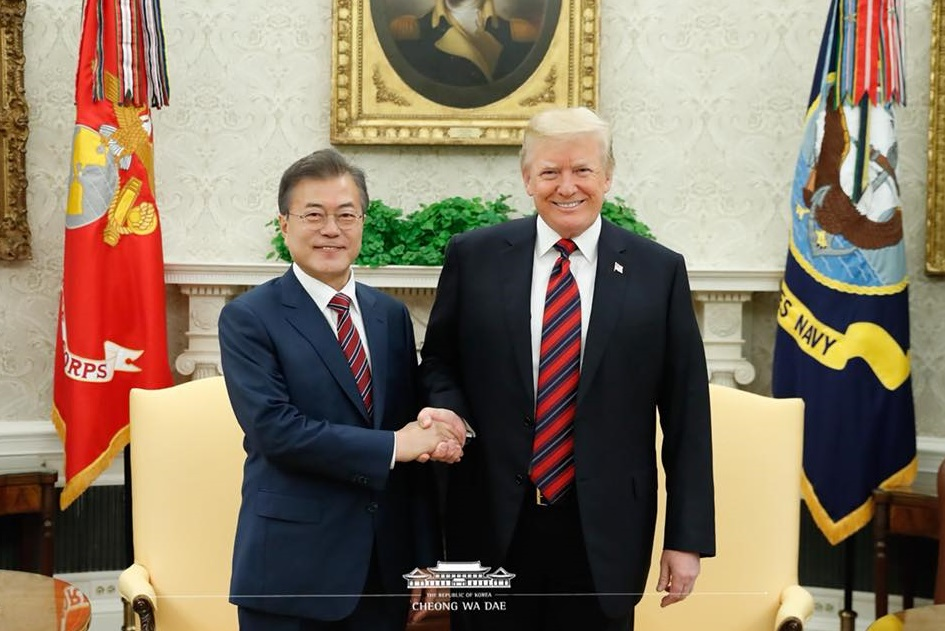
Trump and South Korean president Moon Jae-in, May 2018

Trump and Moon met at the White House in June 2017 to discuss trade relations and North Korean missile programs.

=== South Asia ===
==== Afghanistan ====
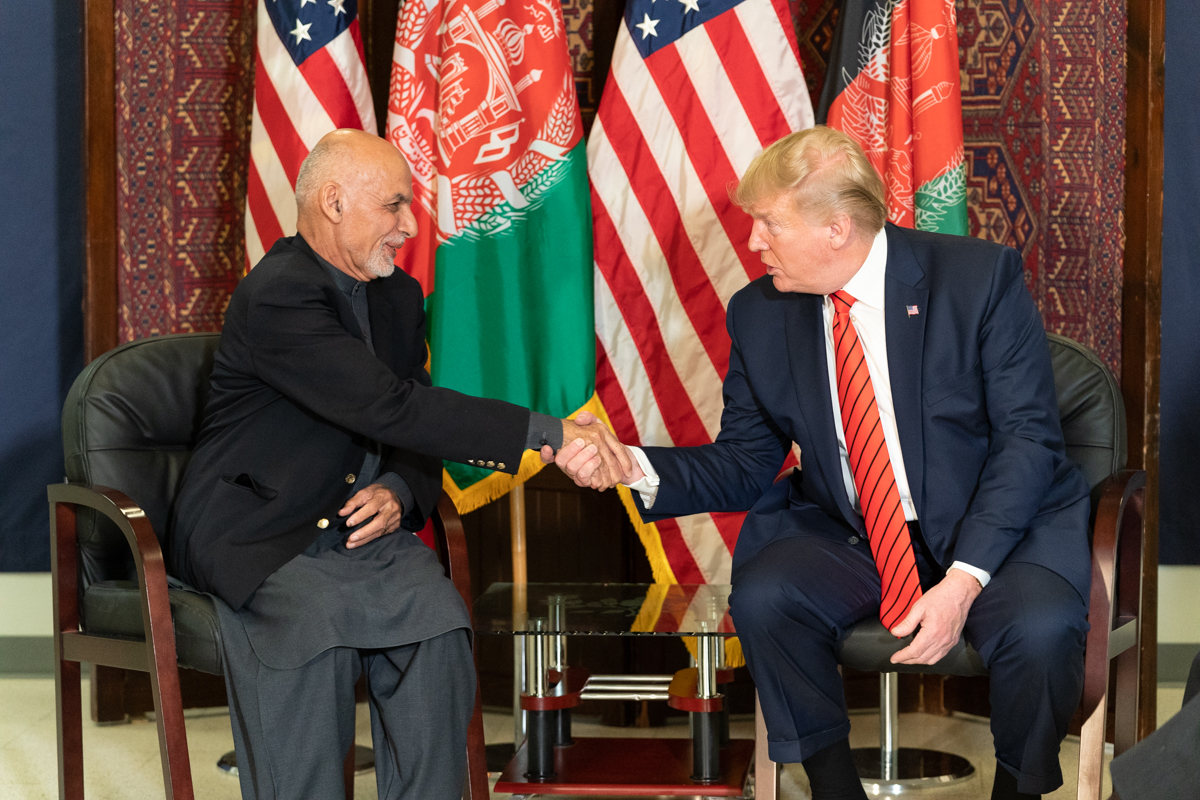
Trump and Afghan president Ashraf Ghani in Kabul, November 2019

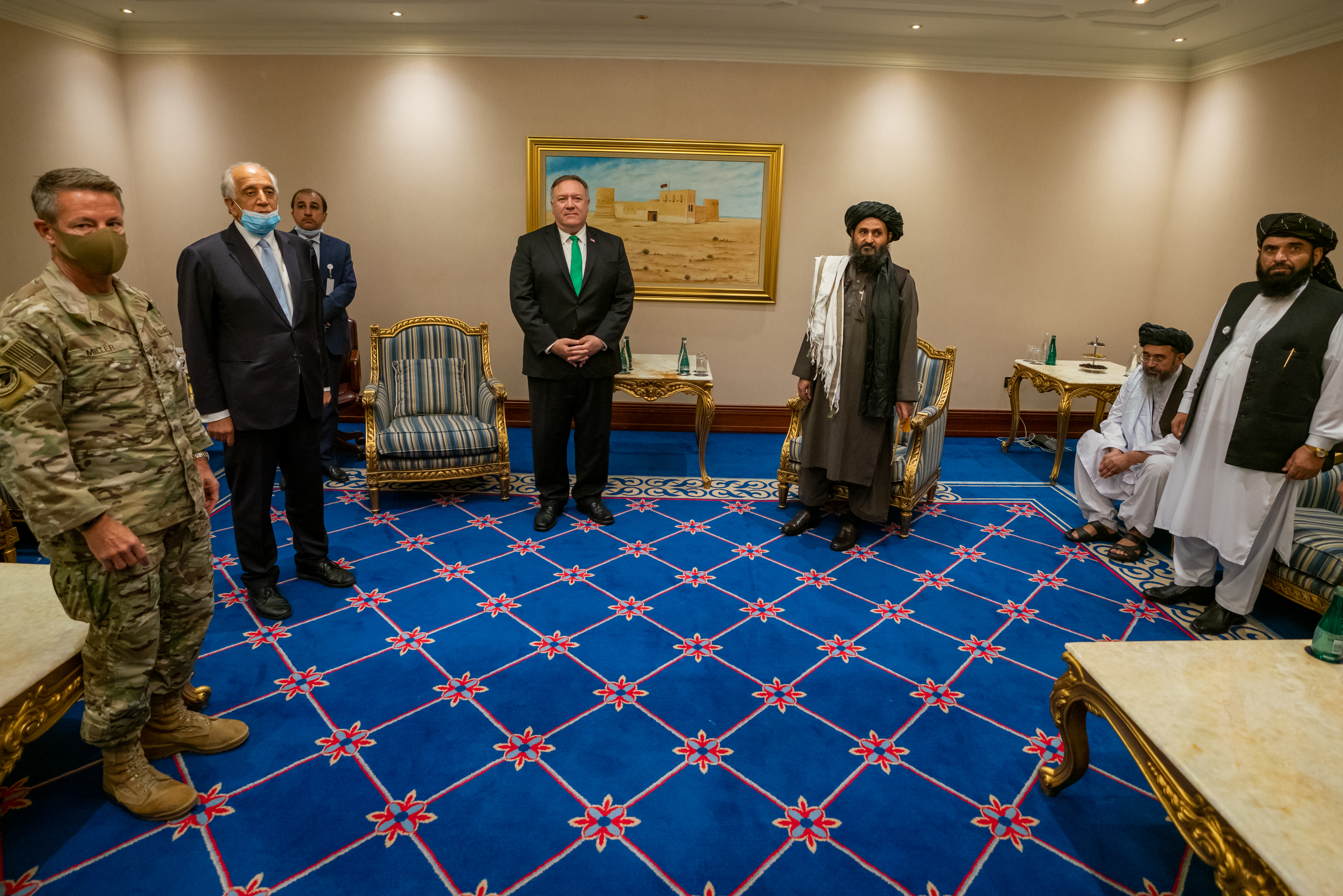
U.S. Secretary of State Mike Pompeo meeting with Taliban delegation in Doha, Qatar, September 2020

On August 21, 2017, Trump stated that he wanted to expand the American presence in Afghanistan, without giving details on how. Trump did not formulate any deadlines or specific purposes to be met, only stating that a U.S. withdrawal was no option now because it would play into the hands of terrorists and put at risk the safety of the U.S. and its allies. Trump said that presently 20 U.S.-designated terrorist organizations are active in Afghanistan and Pakistan. However, according to Barkha Dutt of The Washington Post, this statement contradicted the official U.S. government list, which only lists 13 such organizations there. Taliban spokesman Zabiullah Mujahid condemned Trump's speech: "It looks like America does not want to put an end to its longest war and instead of realizing the realities, is still arrogant on its might and force".

On September 19, 2017, the Trump administration deployed another 3,000 U.S. troops to Afghanistan. This added to the approximately 11,000 U.S. troops already serving in Afghanistan, bringing the total to at least 14,000 U.S. troops stationed in the country.

On February 5, 2019, the Senate voted overwhelmingly to rebuke Trump for his decisions to withdraw troops from Syria and Afghanistan. Drafted by majority leader Mitch McConnell, the measure was supported by nearly all Republicans.

On February 29, 2020, the Trump administration signed the Doha Agreement, a conditional peace agreement with the Taliban, which calls for the withdrawal of foreign troops in 14 months if the Taliban uphold the terms of the agreement. Trump said "it is time" to bring U.S. soldiers home from Afghanistan. Trump's successor, Joe Biden, later extended the deadline for the withdrawal to September 11, 2021, leading Trump to comment in April 2021 that "we can and should get out earlier", that "we should keep as close" to the May 1, 2021, deadline Trump had set, and that the withdrawal was "a wonderful and positive thing to do".

As part of the February 2020 deal, the U.S. agreed to the release of 5,000 Taliban members who were imprisoned by the Afghan government; some of these ex-prisoners went on to join the 2021 Taliban offensive that felled the Afghan government.

==== India ====
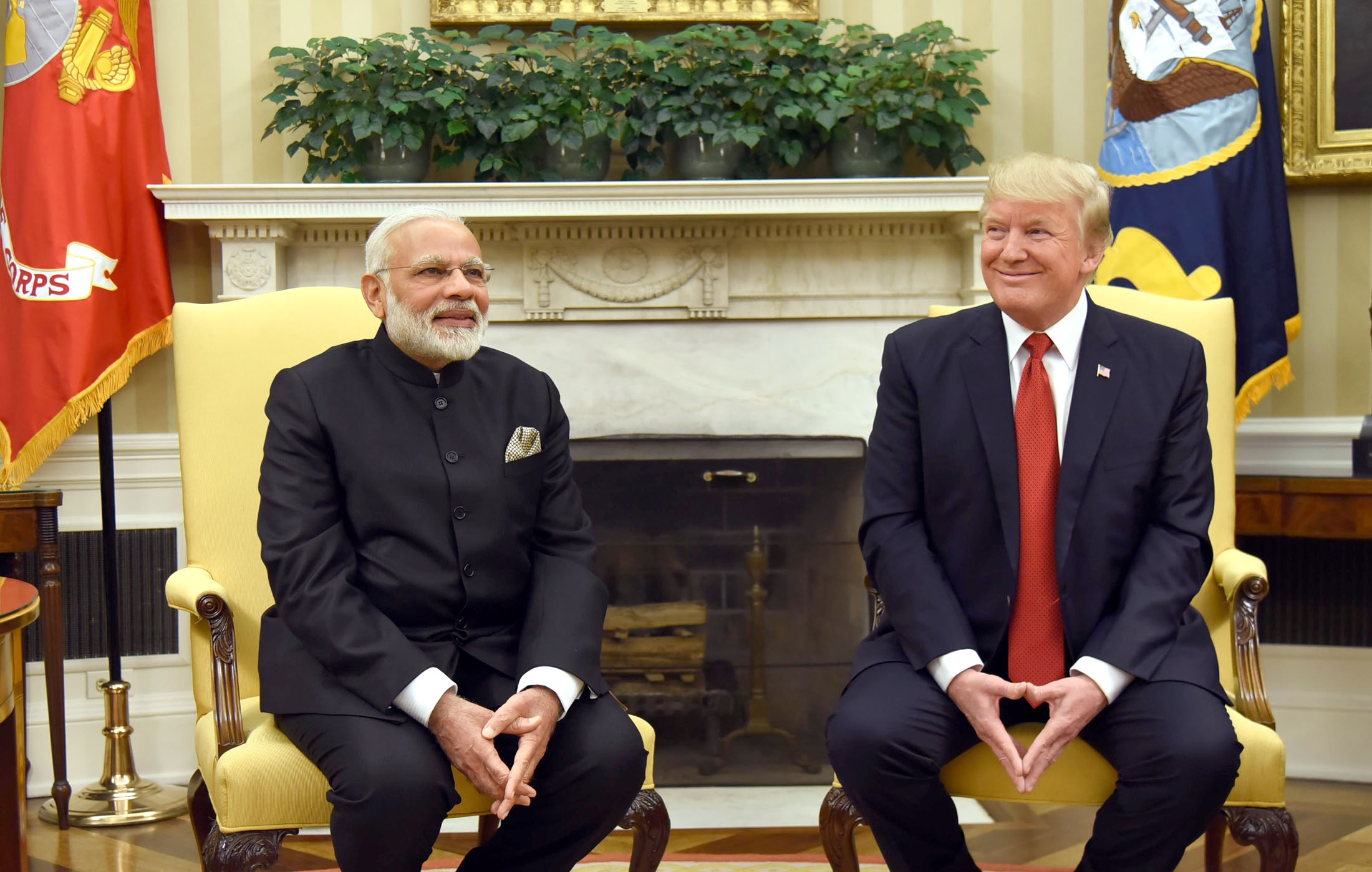
Trump and Indian prime minister Narendra Modi, June 2017

During the 2016 campaign Trump spoke favorably of Indian prime minister Narendra Modi and expressed a desire for a closer alliance with India. He told a campaign rally of Indian-Americans that under his administration, relations with India would be "the best ever". Trump and Modi met at the White House in June 2017, reaffirming the strong partnership between the two nations, especially in defense, maritime security and counterterrorism.

He cited the relations as one of the most important in this century as he made a grand visit in February 2020 right before the onslaught of the COVID-19 pandemic.

==== Pakistan ====
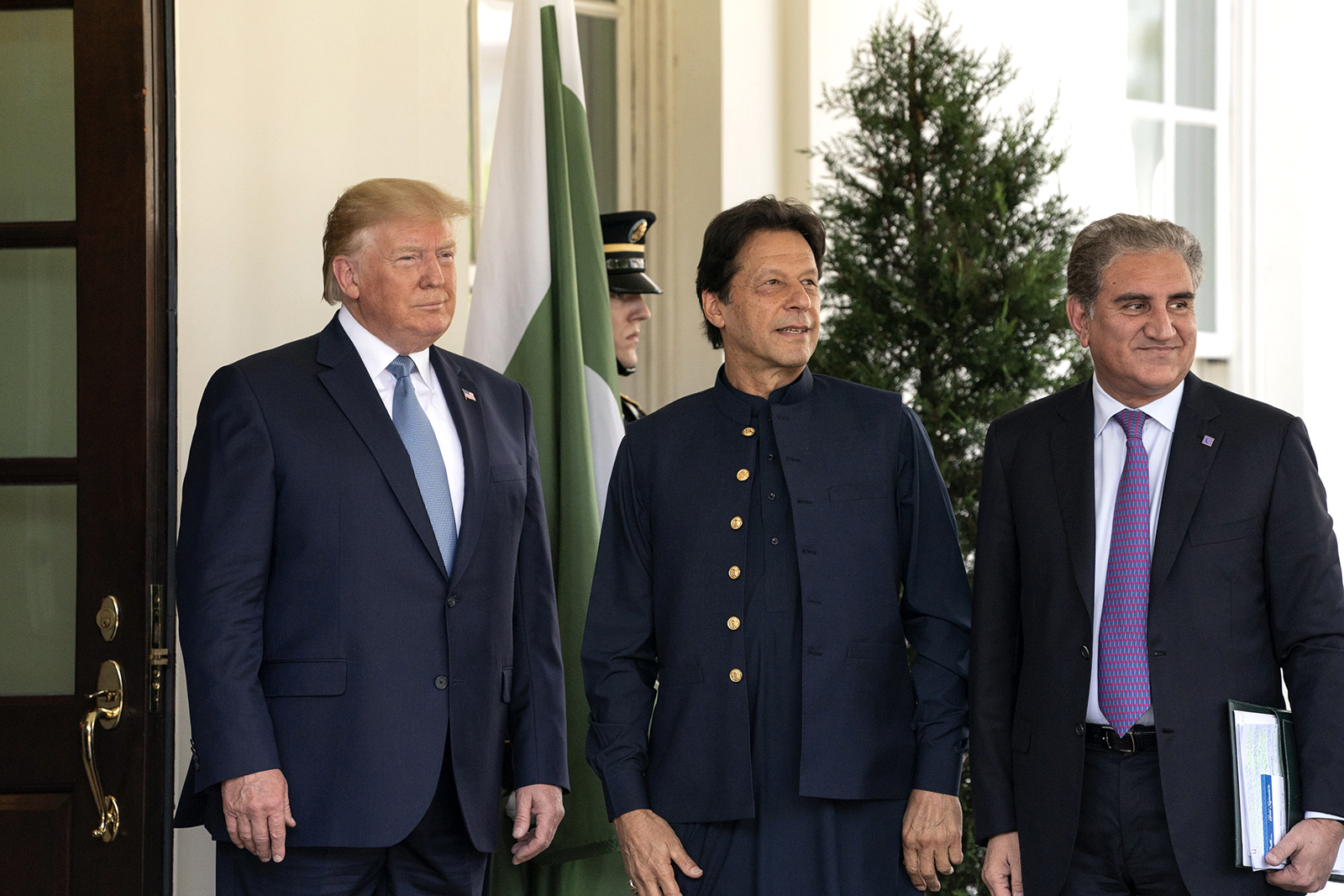
Trump and Pakistani prime minister Imran Khan, July 2019

During the 2016 campaign, Trump said Pakistan is "the most dangerous country in the world" and should denuclearize. But according to the Pakistan government, in a cordial post-election telephone conversation with Pakistan's prime minister Nawaz Sharif, Trump lavished praise on Pakistan and its "fantastic" people, said he would love to visit the country, and offered to help Pakistan solve any outstanding problems.

After taking office, Trump indicated that Pakistan will be among the countries whose citizens will have to go through an "extreme vetting" process before entering the United States. On July 2, 2019, State Department designated Baloch Liberation Army (BLA), a separatist militant group that aims to separate Balochistan from Pakistan, as a terrorist organization.

=== Southeast Asia ===
==== Philippines ====
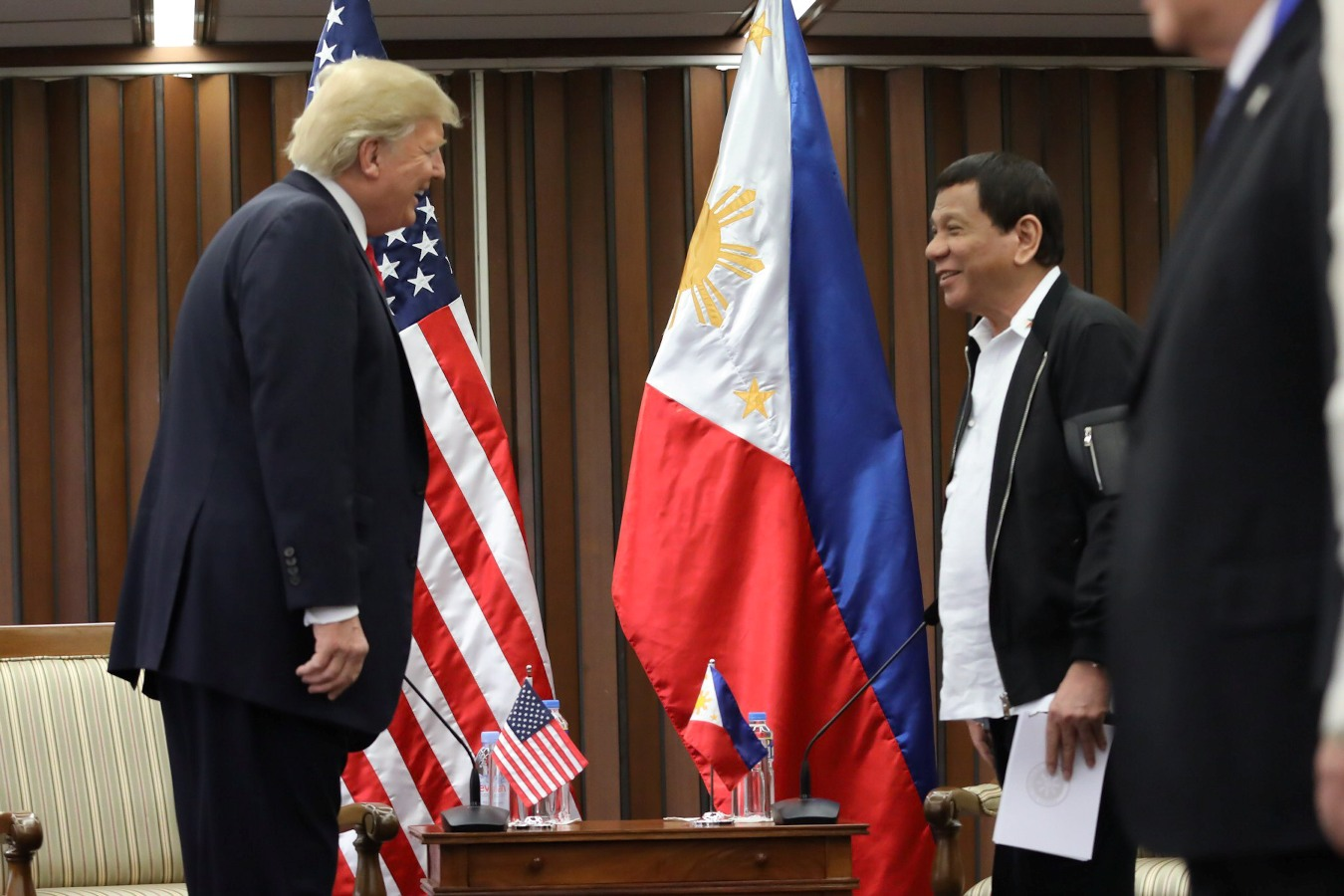
Trump and Filipino president Rodrigo Duterte in Manila, November 2017

U.S.-Philippines relations had taken a turn for the worse with the election of Philippine president Rodrigo Duterte in June 2016. Duterte expressed strong hostility toward then-President Barack Obama and threatened to sever the long-standing ties between the two countries due to the latter's criticism on the issue of human rights in Duterte's policy on the war on drugs. On December 2, 2016, President-elect Trump accepted a congratulatory call from Duterte. A statement from the Trump team said the two leaders "noted the long history of friendship and cooperation between the two nations, and agreed that the two governments would continue to work together closely on matters of shared interest and concern". Duterte claimed afterward that Trump had praised Duterte's controversial "war on drugs", which had killed thousands of people without trial, and that Trump said the Philippines are "doing it as a sovereign nation, the right way."

According to a report by Reuters, in 2020 the Trump administration began a U.S. military-run propaganda campaign to spread disinformation about the Sinovac Chinese COVID-19 vaccine. The campaign was described as "payback" for COVID-19 disinformation by China directed against the U.S. Primarily targeting people in the Philippines, the campaign used fake social media accounts to spread disinformation, including that the Sinovac vaccine contained pork-derived ingredients and was therefore haram under Islamic law. The primary contractor on the project was General Dynamics IT, which received $493 million for its role. The Biden administration ended the campaign in 2021.

== Europe ==
=== Eastern Mediterranean ===
In 2019, Greece and the United States signed a revised defense pact, which American officials described as critical to responding to security challenges in the Eastern Mediterranean Sea. The deal provides for increasing joint U.S.-Greece and NATO activity at Larissa, Stefanovikio, and Alexandroupoli as well as infrastructure and other improvements at the Crete Naval Base.

=== France ===
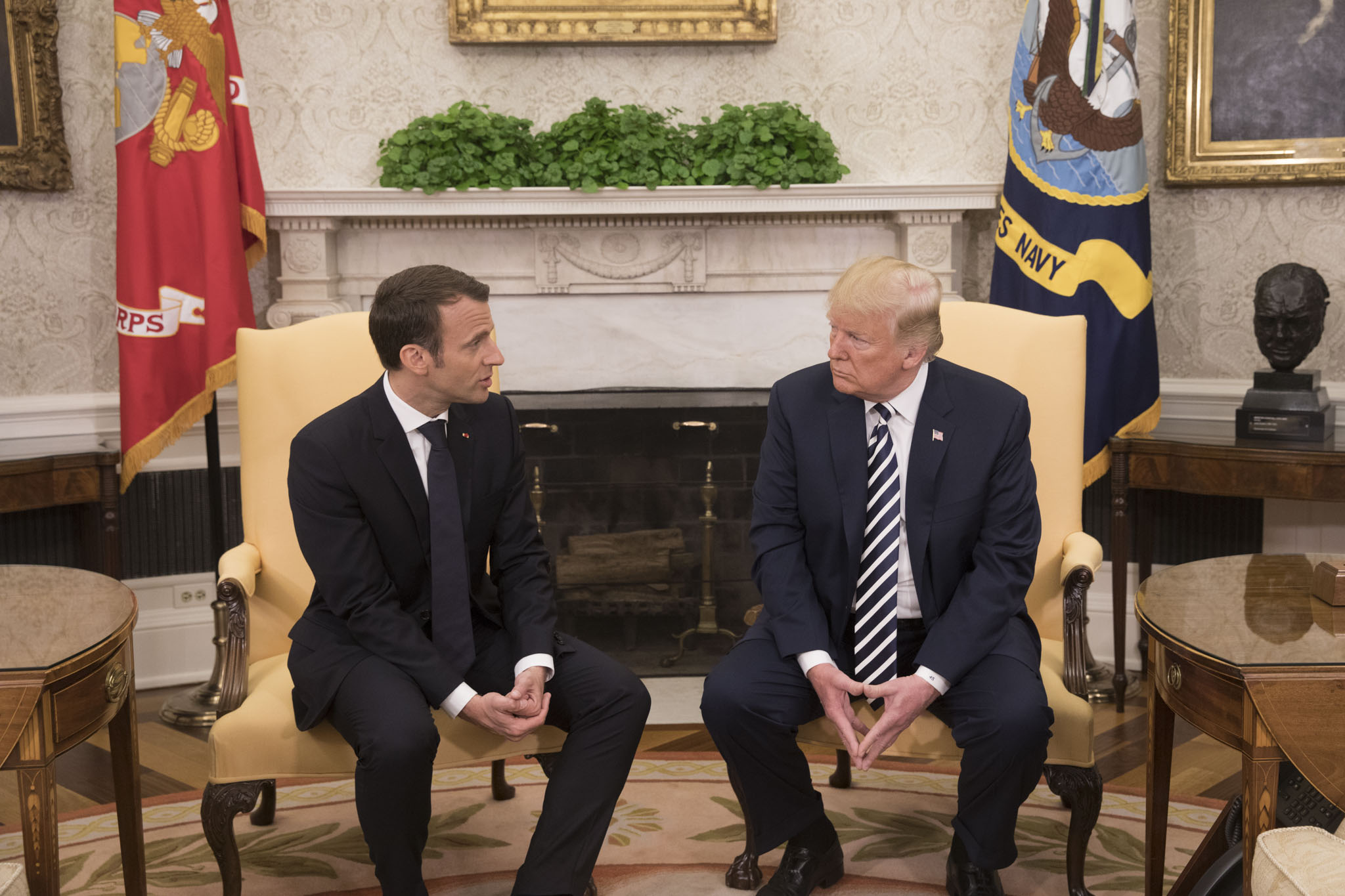
Trump and French president Emmanuel Macron, April 2018

In their first telephone call, President Trump told French president François Hollande that he "loved France" and that there was "no more beautiful country than France". However, in his 2017 CPAC speech, Trump said, "France is no longer France" due to terrorism. In response, President Hollande said allies should not criticize each other, and he invited him to visit Disneyland Paris.

In advance of the 2017 French presidential election Trump was reported to have expressed support for Marine Le Pen, calling her the "strongest candidate", although he did not explicitly endorse her. However, when meeting with newly elected French president Emmanuel Macron in Brussels in May 2017 he said to Macron "you were my guy", stating that media reports had been wrong.

Trump honored the invitation of French president Emmanuel Macron to attend the annual Bastille Day Military Parade on July 14, 2017, in Paris.

=== Germany ===
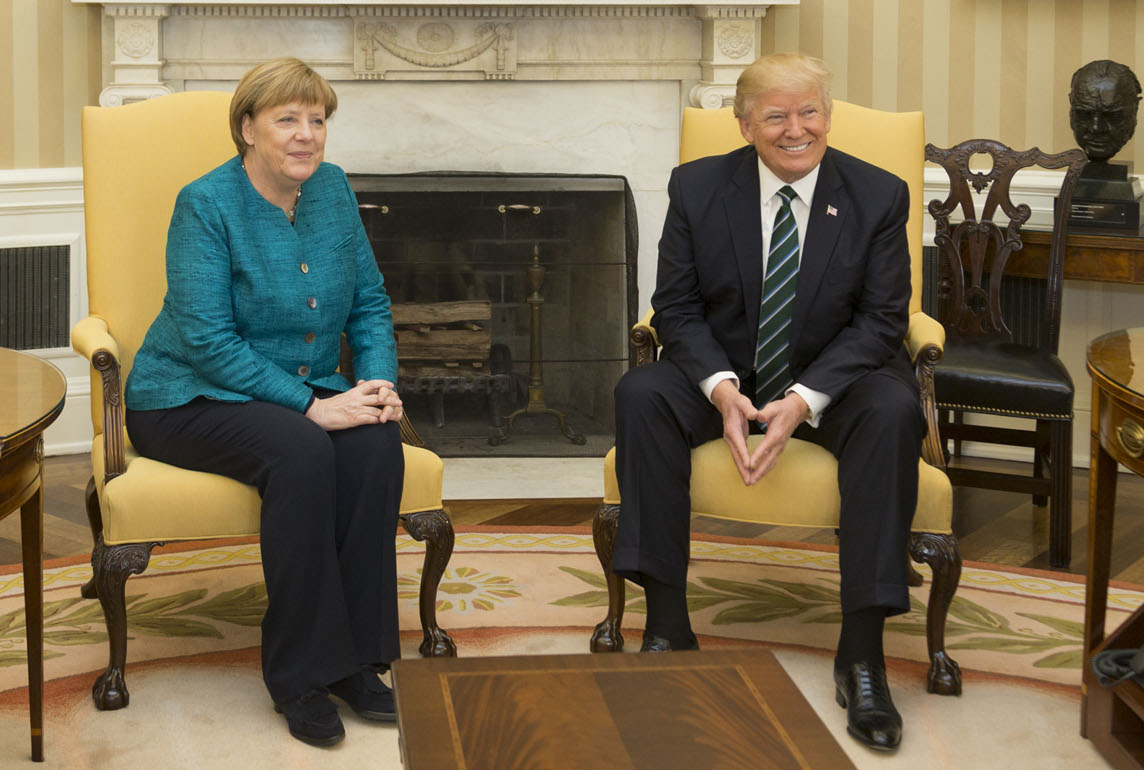
Trump and German Chancellor Angela Merkel, March 2017

American relations with Germany have worsened under President Trump, especially regarding trade and NATO. During the 2016 campaign Trump was critical of German chancellor Angela Merkel and her handling of the European migrant crisis, saying "Everyone thought she was a really great leader and now she's turned out to be this catastrophic leader. And she'll be out if they don't have a revolution." In July 2016, German foreign minister Frank-Walter Steinmeier stated that he was concerned about what he sees as Trump's contradictory promises to "make America strong again" while simultaneously reducing involvement overseas. Steinmeier said that Trump's proposed policies "would be dangerous not only for the United States, but for Europe and the rest of the world as well".

After becoming president, Trump met with Merkel at the White House on March 17, 2017. The meeting was described as "awkward"; Trump failed to shake hands with Merkel for a photo op, and he made a joke about wiretapping which fell flat. The two "politely disagreed on everything from immigration to free trade and the value of seeking multinational agreements." The next day Trump tweeted, "Germany owes vast sums of money to NATO & the United States must be paid more for the powerful, and very expensive, defense it provides to Germany!" He also tried to get Merkel to talk about bilateral trade issues, but she pointed out that EU members only negotiate as a unit.

In May 2017, at a meeting with European leaders in Brussels, Trump denounced Germany concerning the trade deficit as "bad, very bad", adding "Look at the millions of cars they sell in the US. Terrible. We will stop this." He threatened to impose a 35% tax on German car imports. A few days later Merkel suggested that Germany and Europe can no longer fully rely on the United States; and saying "we Europeans must really take our destiny into our own hands", also hinting to the decision by the United Kingdom to leave the European Union. However she underlined the importance of friendly relations with the United States, the United Kingdom as well as Russia.

In late July 2020, the Trump administration announced its intentions to disperse 12,000 American troops from Germany and move the headquarters of U.S. European Command (EUCOM) from Germany to Belgium in a major repositioning of forces, reportedly because Germany was not spending enough on its defense budget. Of the U.S. troops stationed in Germany, 6,400 will also return to the United States. Another 5,400 will be moved to other locations in Europe that already house American troops but pay less of a percentage of its GDP than that of Germany.

=== Holy See ===
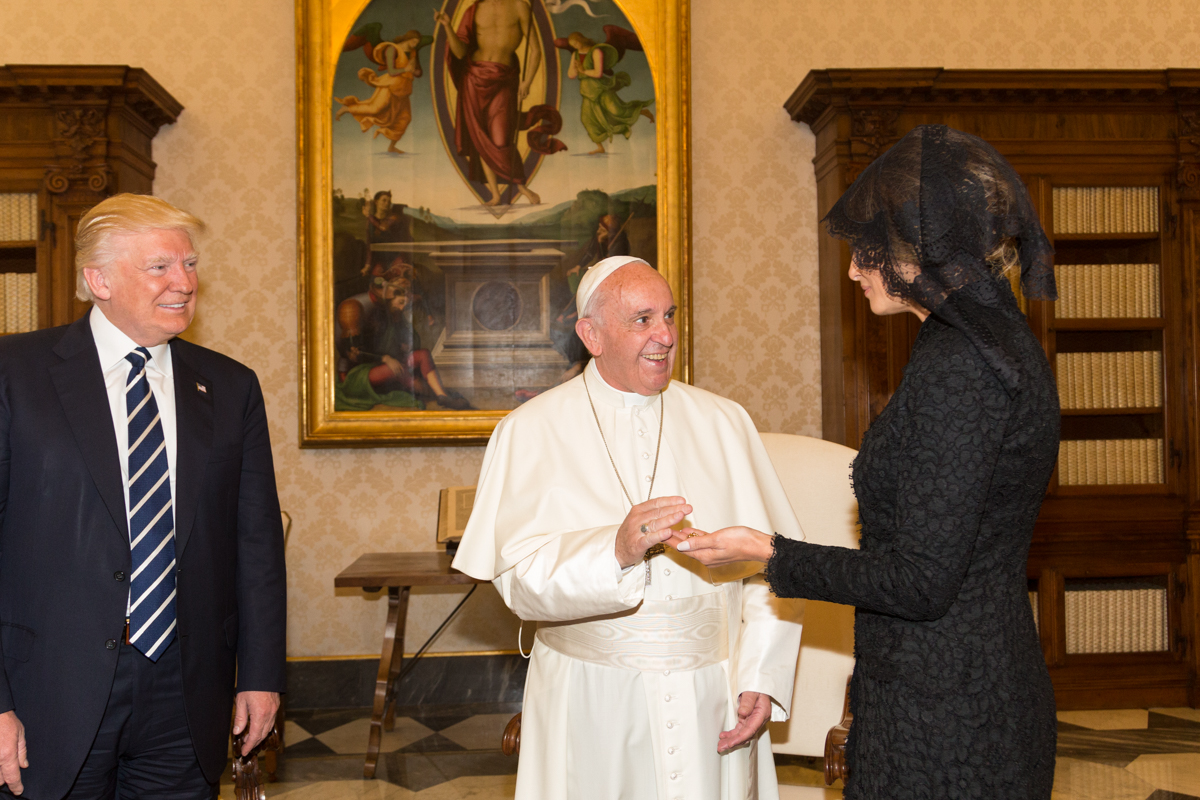
Trump and First Lady Melania Trump meet Pope Francis in Vatican City, May 2017

On May 24, 2017, Pope Francis met with Trump in Vatican City where they discussed the contributions of Catholics to the United States and to the world. Trump and the Pope discussed issues of mutual concern including how religious communities can combat human suffering in crisis regions, such as Iraq, Syria, Libya, and ISIL-controlled territory. Trump and Pope Francis also discussed terrorism and the radicalization of young people.

The Vatican's secretary of state, Pietro Parolin, raised the issue of climate change in the meeting and encouraged Trump to remain in the Paris Agreement.

=== Hungary ===
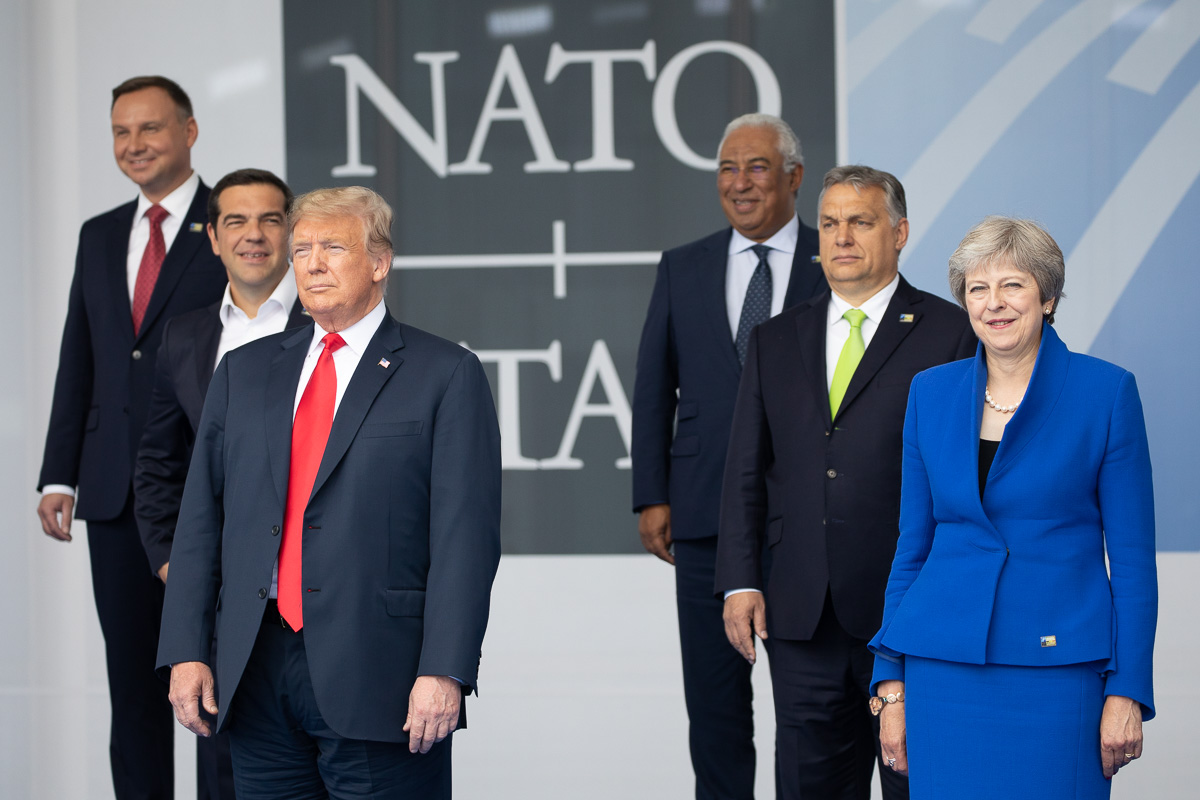
Trump (Left) and Orbán (Right) at a NATO Meeting with other world leaders

The Trump administration's approach towards Viktor Orbán's "illiberal" right-wing Fidesz government had been supportive, but, according to The Guardian, "ineffective" in advancing American interests.

=== Italy ===
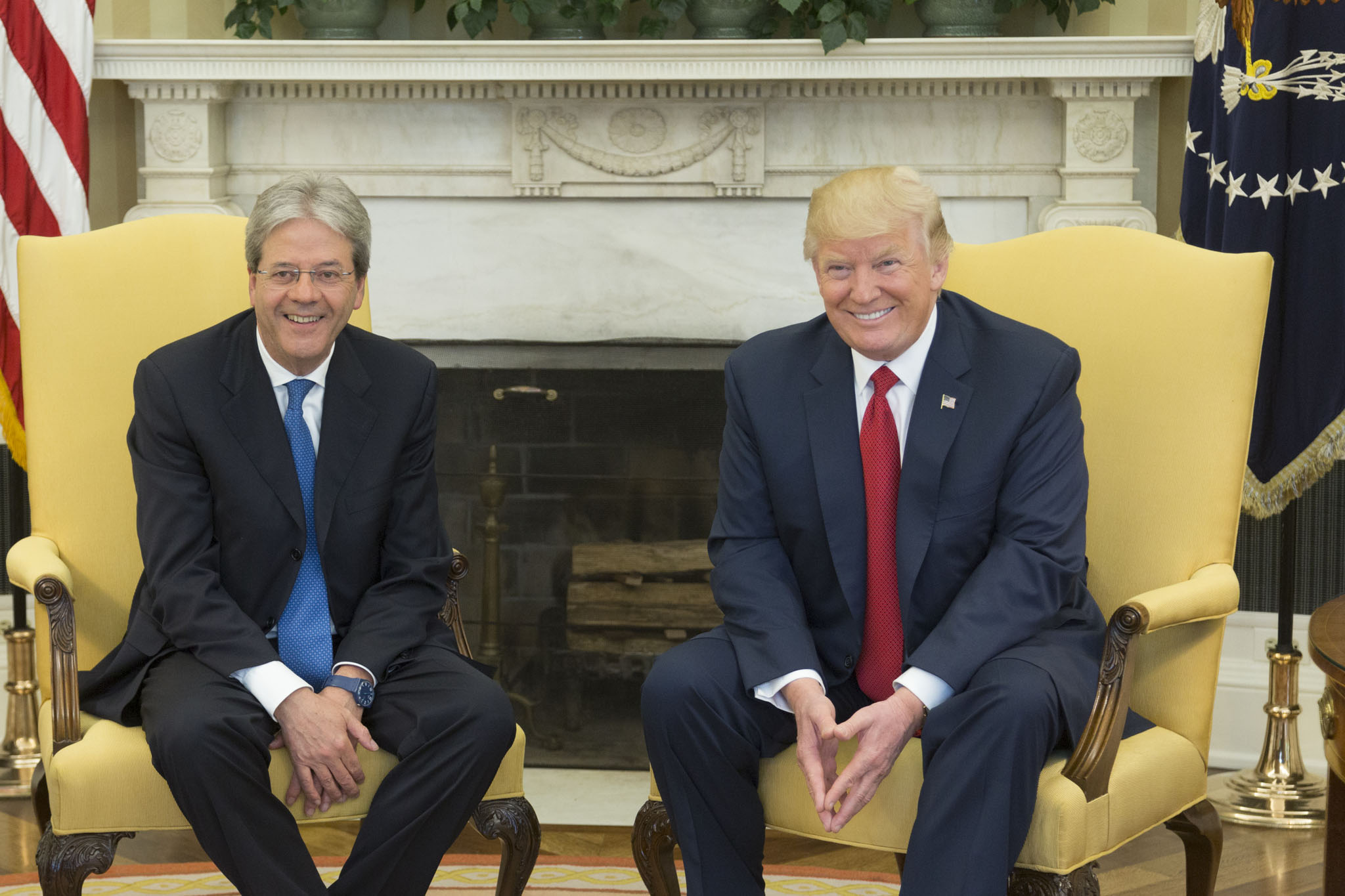
Trump and Italian prime minister Paolo Gentiloni, April 2017

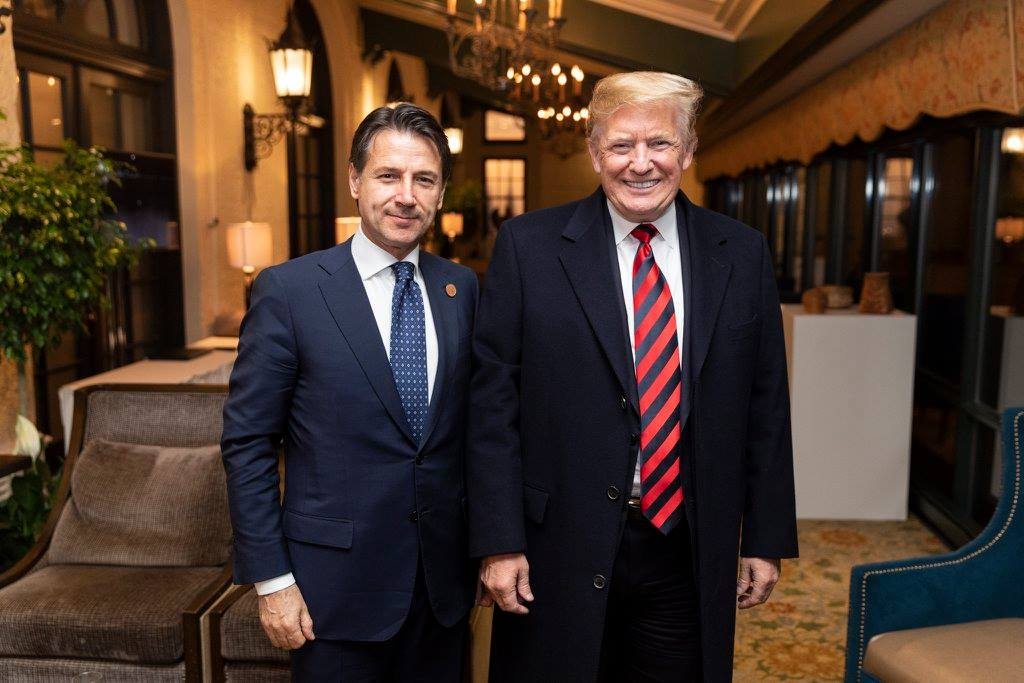
Trump and Italian prime minister Giuseppe Conte at the G7 summit in La Malbaie, June 2018

Italy was the first European country to be visited by Trump. He went to Italy in May 2017, during his first presidential trip outside the U.S. During his trip to Italy, Trump held a bilateral meeting with Pope Francis; and met Italian president Sergio Mattarella and Prime Minister Paolo Gentiloni. Gentiloni was also hosted by Trump at the White House in April 2017, a few weeks before Trump took part in the 43rd G7 summit held in Italy. Trump often stated that Italy is a "key ally of America in Europe and the Mediterranean Sea and a strategic partner in the War on Terrorism."

In June 2018, Gentiloni was replaced by Giuseppe Conte, a populist politician, who built a close relationship with Trump. Since the beginning of Conte's government, Trump considered him a key ally during international meetings, and Conte offered to be a "privileged interlocutor" in Europe. On June 8 and 9, during G7 summit, Conte was the only leader to back Trump and his proposal to readmit Russia into the G7. On the following day, Conte was thanked for his positions on Russia and his populist stance by Trump, who invited him to the White House. On June 28, Conte participated in his first European Council meeting and blocked a joint EU trade and defense statement criticizing Trump's tariff policy.

In June 2018, Trump praised Conte, describing him as a "really great leader" and "very strong on immigration". Trump also endorsed Conte during the 2019 government crisis, hoping that he could remain prime minister. On March 31, 2020, Trump announced that the United States would send 100 million dollars of medical aids to Italy, in response to the COVID-19 pandemic which was affecting the country. After few days, during an interview at the NBC, Conte described Trump as "Italy's most true and loyal friend". On April 11, Trump issued an executive order in which he allowed U.S. militaries deployed in Italy to assist Italian law enforcement in facing the crisis.

=== Kosovo–Serbia conflict ===
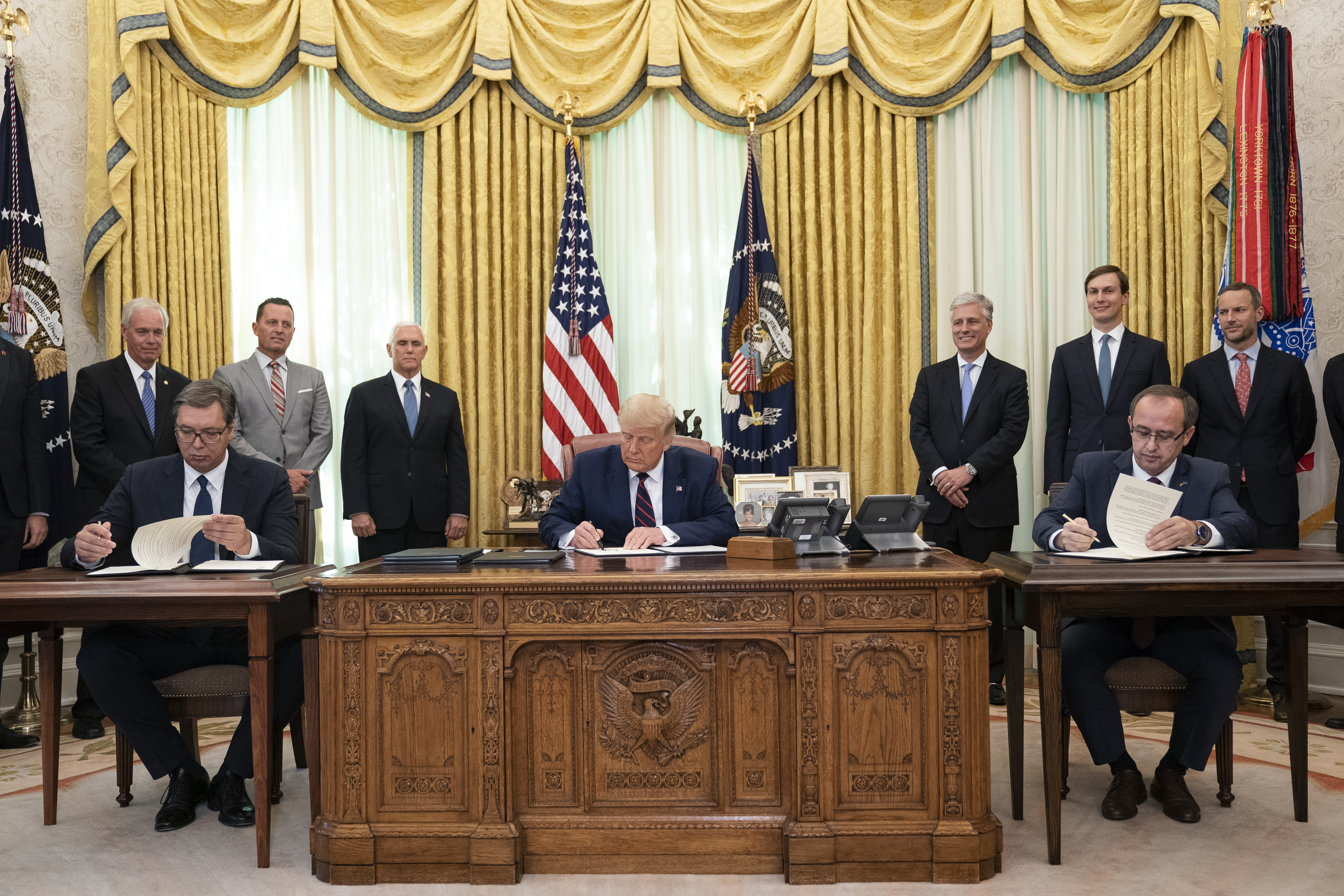
Trump signs the agreements, alongside Serbian president Aleksandar Vučić and Kosovan prime minister Avdullah Hoti in the Oval Office, September 4, 2020

On October 4, 2019, Trump appointed Richard Grenell as Special Presidential Envoy for Serbia and Kosovo Peace Negotiations. After months of diplomatic talks, facilitated by Grenell, on January 20, 2020, Serbia and Kosovo agreed to restore flights between their capitals for the first time in more than two decades. The Trump administration initiated diplomatic negotiations that resulted in the 2020 Kosovo and Serbia economic agreements on the normalisation of economic relations, which was signed by Serbian president Aleksandar Vučić and Kosovan prime minister Avdullah Hoti, at the White House, in the presence of President Trump on September 4, 2020. The deal will encompass freer transit, including by rail and road, while both parties agreed to work with the Export–Import Bank of the United States and the U.S. International Development Finance Corporation and to join the Mini Schengen Zone, but the agreement also included the relocation of the Serbian embassy to Jerusalem, as well as, and mutual recognition between Israel and Kosovo.

=== Poland ===
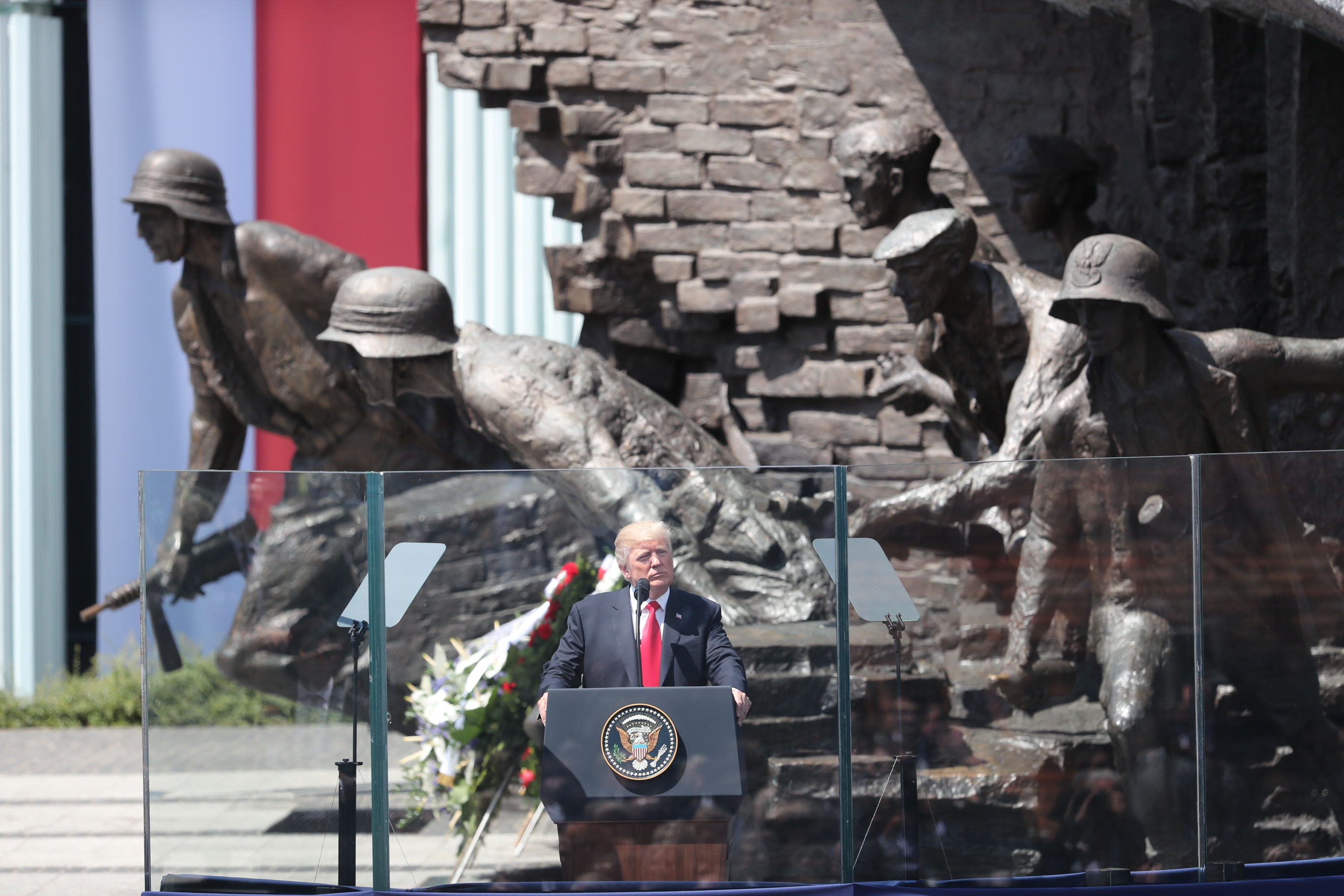
Trump delivering a speech in front of the Warsaw Uprising Monument at the Krasiński Square in Warsaw, July 2017

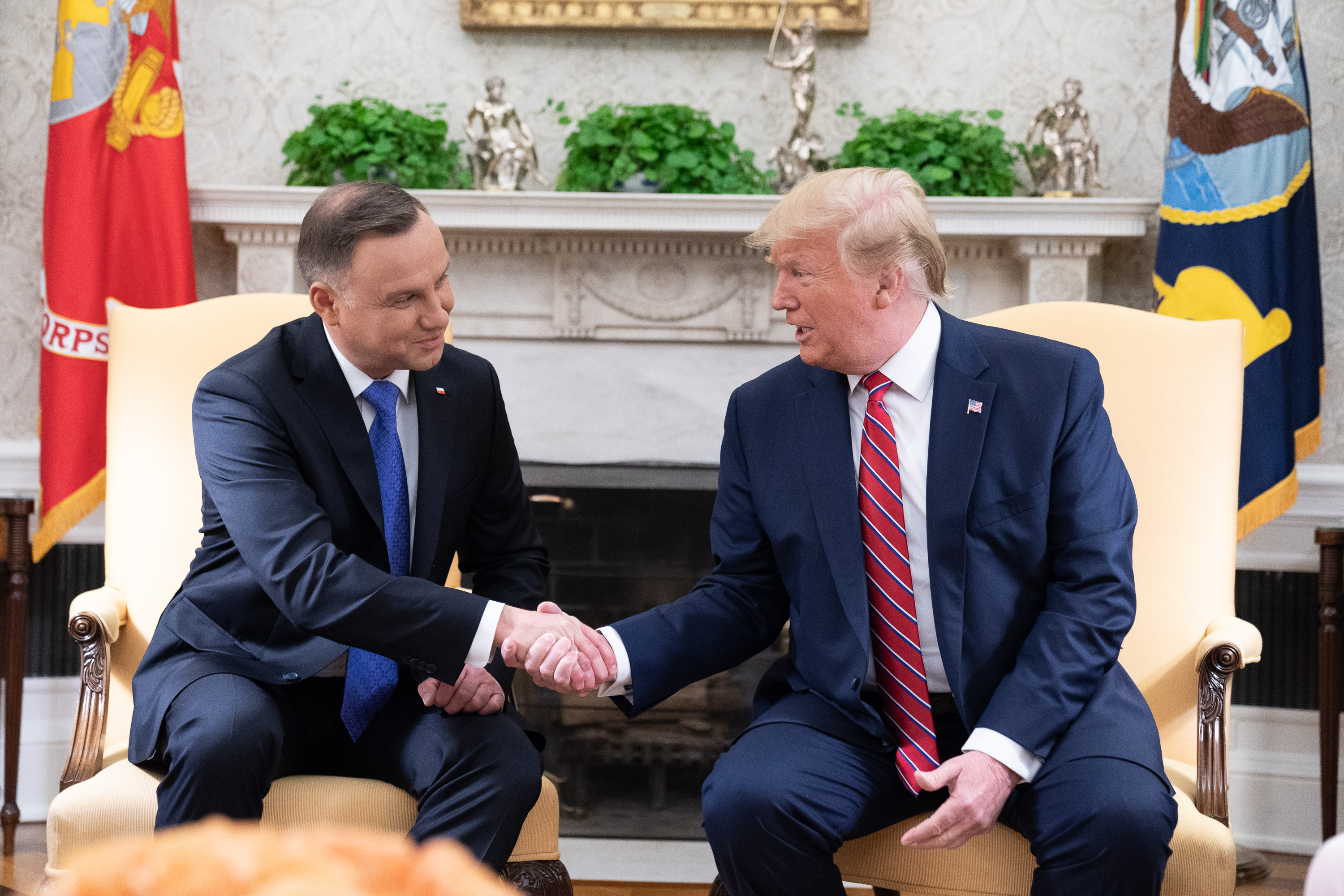
Trump and Polish president Andrzej Duda, June 2019

During the Trump administration, Poland and the United States continued to exhibit warm military, diplomatic, and economic bilateral relations. This was bolstered by the broadly shared neo-nationalist values between President Donald Trump and Polish president Andrzej Duda, along with Poland's desire for strengthened military ties with the United States in order to counter Russian influence in Europe, particularly following the 2014 Russian annexation of Crimea.

In July 2017, in his second foreign trip, President Trump visited Poland where he met with the president, Andrzej Duda. He also said: "Our strong alliance with Poland and NATO remains critical to deterring conflict and ensuring that war between great powers never again ravages Europe, and that the world will be a safer and better place. America is committed to maintaining peace and security in Central and Eastern Europe". Trump says the U.S. stands firmly behind NATO's Article 5, which says an attack against one member is attack against all.

Trump described Poland as a long-time U.S. ally that is "an example for others who seek freedom and who wish to summon the courage and the will to defend our civilization." He also attended in the Three Seas Initiative summit 2017 in Warsaw. Razem, a Polish left-wing political party, organized a protest against Trump. Protesters were dressed as handmaids from Margaret Atwood's dystopian novel The Handmaid's Tale, as a symbol of women's rights being endangered both in Poland and the United States.

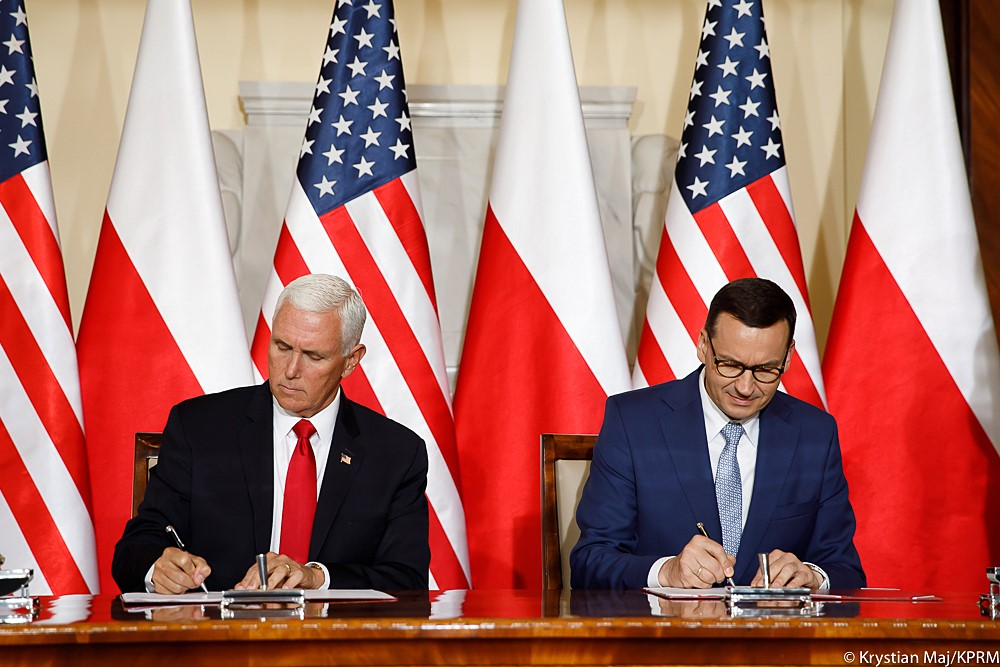
Vice President Mike Pence and Polish prime minister Mateusz Morawiecki signed joint declaration on 5G, 2019

In June 2019, during a trip to the United States to celebrate the 20th anniversary of Poland's membership in NATO and the 30th anniversary of communism's downfall in the country, Duda visited the White House where he and Trump signed a joint defense agreement to increase military cooperation. According to the agreement, which Trump called a "statement" on the relationship between the two countries, Poland will pay for an additional 1,000 U.S. troops to be stationed in Poland on a rotational basis. The force will be apportioned from the 52,000-strong contingent of U.S. forces in Germany and will include special operations troops, drones and other military hardware. In a separate deal, Poland ordered 32 F-35 fighter jets from the U.S. Trump celebrated the agreement with two F-35 jets conducting flybys over the White House in a rare U.S. military display.

On that day, Polish state-owned natural gas company PGNiG signed an agreement with U.S. company Venture Global LNG to buy 1.5 million metric tons of liquefied natural gas per year as part of an initiative to seek alternative supplies of gas other than Russia's Gazprom. The deal is seen as part of the Trump administration's "energy dominance" economic policy, in which the U.S. slashes domestic regulations on energy production to boost oil and gas exports to allies and trade partners, such as Poland, serving as an alternative to Russian gas pipelines.

On June 24, 2020, Trump said at a press conference with Polish president Duda that the United States plans to move some U.S. troops from Germany to Poland. Trump said that "Poland is one of the few countries that are fulfilling their obligations under NATO — in particular, their monetary obligations — and they asked us if we would send some additional troops."

=== Russia ===
Trump praised Russian president Vladimir Putin repeatedly over a series of years.

==== During the 2016 campaign ====
During the 2016 campaign, Trump's praise of Vladimir Putin blossomed into what many observers termed a "bromance". In particular, Trump praised Putin as a "strong leader" and said that he expected to "get along very well" with Putin. Trump often described Putin as "a better leader" than Obama. Putin praised Trump as "a very bright and talented man, no doubt about that", and Trump claimed Putin called him a "genius", a mischaracterization based on an incorrect translation. When asked about allegations that Putin has killed journalists and political opponents, Trump brushed them off, implying that the United States has done the same thing.

Trump hinted that he would consider recognizing Crimea as Russian territory and lifting the sanctions on Russia that were imposed after Russia began military invention in an attempt to undermine the new, pro-Western Ukrainian government. He suggested that the "people of Crimea ... would rather be with Russia". It had been suggested that these policies were influenced by advisors who were sympathetic to Russian influence in Ukraine, including Paul Manafort, Carter Page, Henry Kissinger, and Michael T. Flynn. Manafort in particular was strongly connected to Viktor Yanukovych, the pro-Russian president of Ukraine who was deposed in the 2014 Ukrainian revolution.

Trump also said that Russia could help the United States in fighting the ISIS terror organization.

==== The Trump administration ====
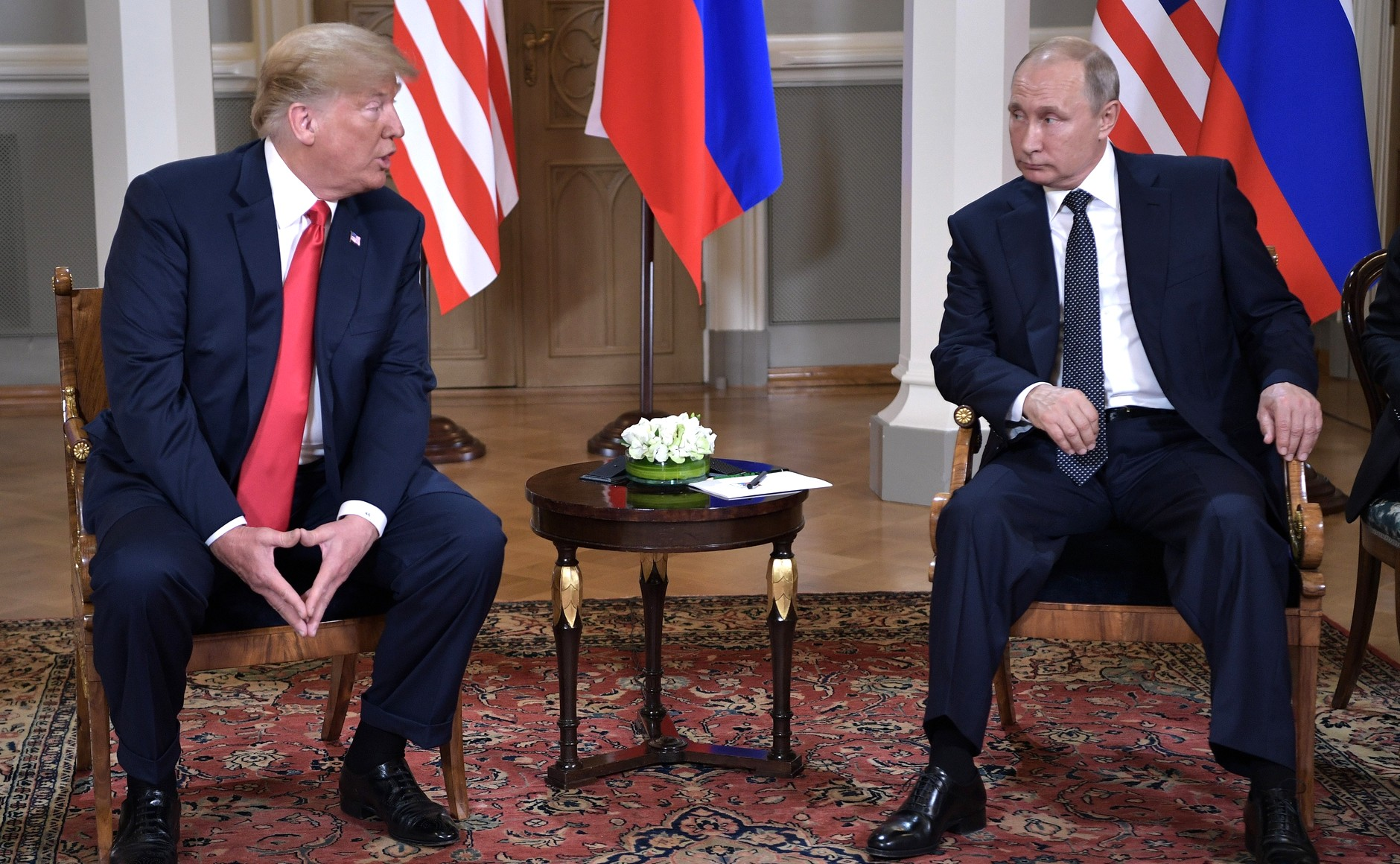
Trump and Russian president Vladimir Putin at the summit meeting in Helsinki, July 2018

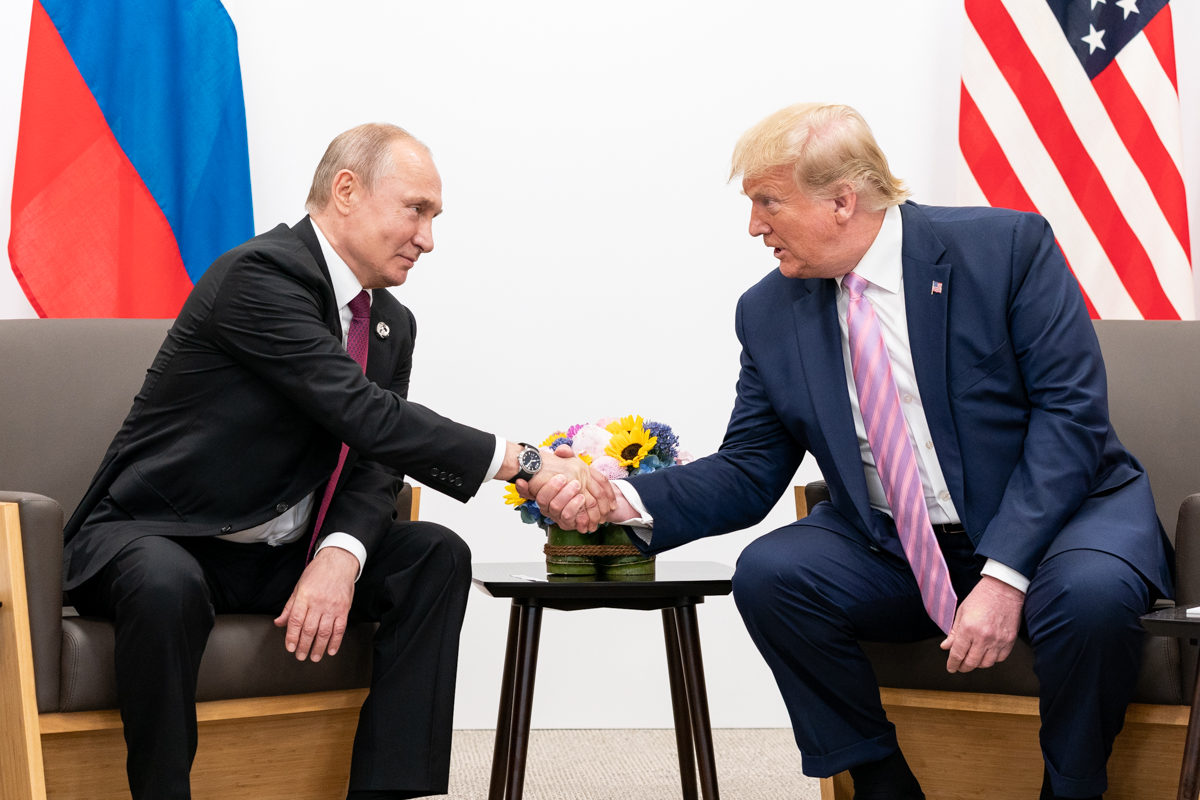
Trump and Russian president Vladimir Putin at the G20 summit in Osaka, June 2019

In Trump's first 60-minute telephone call with Russian president Putin, Putin inquired about extending New START nuclear arms reduction treaty between the U.S. and Russia, negotiated by President Barack Obama in 2010. Trump attacked the treaty, claiming that it favored Russia and was "one of several bad deals negotiated by the Obama administration".

On February 6, 2017, talking to Bill O'Reilly on Fox News, Trump questioned the veracity of O'Reilly's claim that ″within 24 hours of you on the phone with the Russian leader, the pro-Russian forces step[ed] up the violence in Ukraine″. He said he ″respected″ Putin and dismissed O'Reilly's statement that Putin was a ″killer″, which prompted CNN to opine that Trump had "appeared to equate U.S. actions with the authoritarian regime of Russian president Vladimir Putin."

As Trump's National Security Advisor, Michael T. Flynn was an important link in the connections between Putin and Trump in the "Ukraine peace plan", an unofficial plan "organized outside regular diplomatic channels....at the behest of top aides to President Putin". This plan, aimed at easing the sanctions imposed on Russia, progressed from Putin and his advisors to Ukrainian politician Andrey Artemenko, Felix Sater, Michael Cohen, and Flynn, where he would have then presented it to Trump. The New York Times reported that Sater delivered the plan "in a sealed envelope" to Cohen, who then passed it on to Flynn in February 2017, just before his resignation.

In February 2017, following his first meeting with his Russian counterpart Sergey Lavrov, Secretary of State Rex Tillerson said that the U.S. expected Russia to "honor its commitment to the Minsk agreements and work to de-escalate the violence in Ukraine". On the same day Secretary of Defense James Mattis, declared that the United States was not currently prepared to collaborate with Russia on military matters, including future anti-ISIL US operations.

Michael Isikoff of Yahoo! News reported in June 2017 that during the early weeks of the Trump administration, State Department employees were told to develop proposals to lift the sanctions which had been imposed on Russia after its military incursions into Ukraine and its interference in the November election. No action or return would be expected from Russia in return for removing the sanctions. The proposals were dropped after resistance from State Department employees and a realization that such an action would look bad politically in light of the investigations into a Russia connection to the Trump campaign. A former State Department employee who retired in February said, "What was troubling about these stories is that suddenly I was hearing that we were preparing to rescind sanctions in exchange for, well, nothing."

According to a poll conducted by the SSRS, approximately 70% of Americans find that the federal investigation into Russia's efforts to influence the 2016 presidential election in the US should be able to look into President Donald Trump's finances. 60% of those polled view this as a serious matter that should be fully investigated, and it was recorded that 38% view it as a way to discredit the presidency of Donald Trump. In an approximate two-to-one margin, those polled disapprove of the way the president is dealing with the Russian investigation. According to the book The Madman Theory by CNN anchor Jim Sciutto, Susan M. Gordon, the former principal deputy director of national intelligence, stated that Trump downplayed Russian interference in the 2016 presidential election and refused to devote the necessary resources to defend against it in the future. She went on to say that Trump had a "disproportionate affection for Russia".

On August 2, 2017, Trump signed into law the Countering America's Adversaries Through Sanctions Act (CAATSA), which imposed new sanctions on Russia.

As president, Trump continued to advocate for U.S.-Russia cooperation against the Islamic State terror organization. At his first direct meeting and encounter with Russian president Vladimir Putin, he approved a collaborative plan for a limited cease-fire in the Syrian civil war.

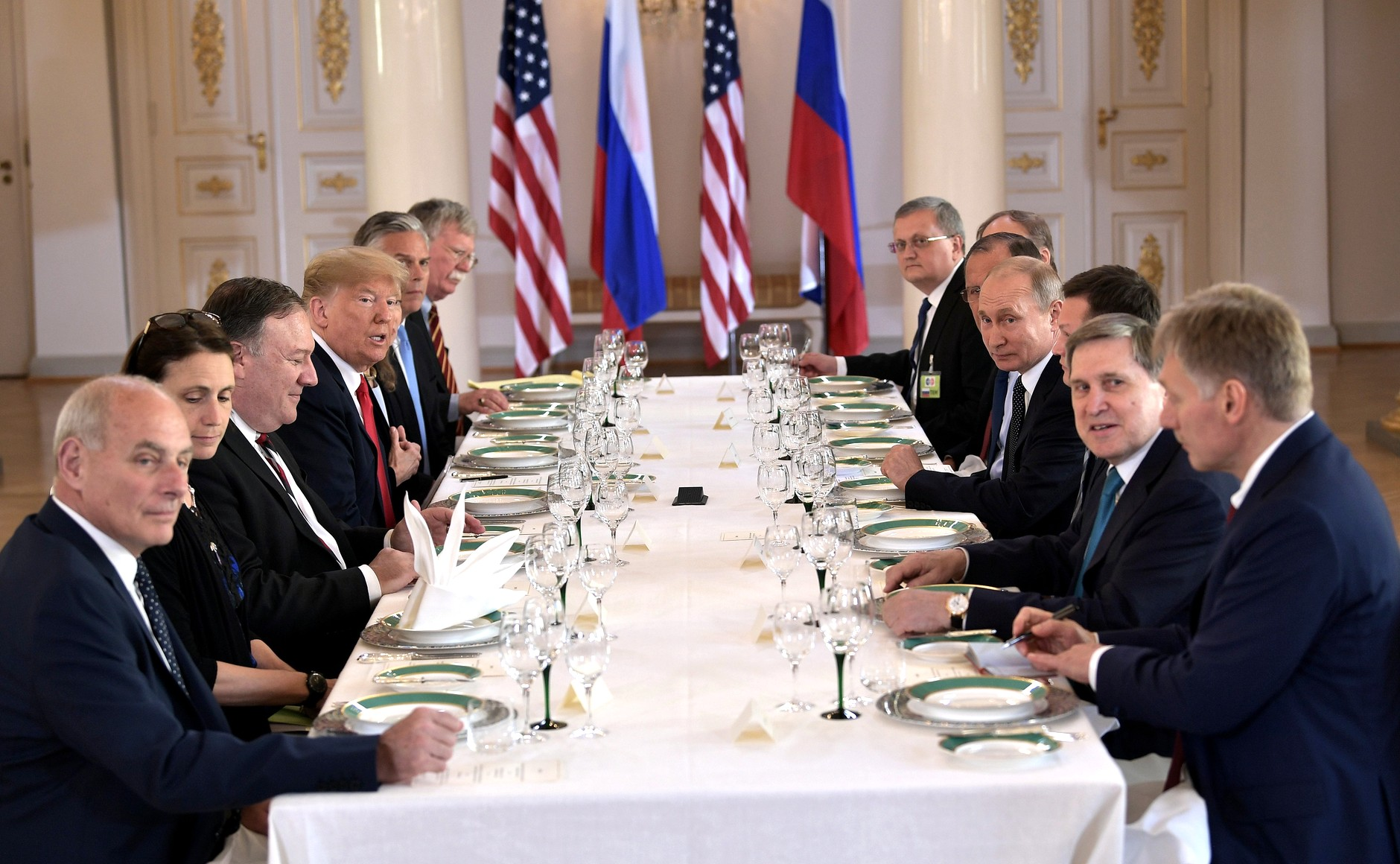
Talks between U.S. delegation headed by Trump and Russian delegation headed by Putin at the summit meeting in Helsinki, July 2018

Trump met with Putin at a summit in Helsinki on July 16, 2018. The two leaders spoke one-on-one for two hours, with no aides or other people present except for two translators. There was no definite agenda, and no definite agreements were announced. After a joint press conference at the conclusion of the meeting, Trump drew harsh bipartisan criticism in the United States for appearing to side with Putin's denial of Russian interference in the 2016 presidential election, rather than accepting the findings of the United States intelligence community. Universally condemned by Democrats, his comments were also strongly criticized by many congressional Republicans and most media commentators, even those who normally support him.

Amid continuing growth of China's missile forces, Trump announced in October 2018 that he was withdrawing the U.S. from the Intermediate-Range Nuclear Forces Treaty due to supposed Russian non-compliance, a move criticized by the former Soviet leader Mikhail Gorbachev, who signed the treaty in 1987 with U.S. president Ronald Reagan.

On May 3, 2019, Trump held an hour and a half-long phone call with President Putin from the White House. The Russian Embassy stated that the pair discussed "shared commitment to step up dialogue in various areas, including on issues of strategic stability." Trump called the conversation "positive" and tweeted there was "Tremendous potential for a good/great relationship with Russia," and later relayed to reporters Putin's assurances that Russia isn't seeking to "get involved" with the ongoing 2019 Venezuelan presidential crisis, despite Trump's national security advisors saying otherwise. They also discussed North Korean missile activity, with Putin briefing Trump on the April 25 meetings with North Korean leader Kim Jong-un. Trump and Putin agreed on the importance of denuclearization and normalization of relations on the Korean peninsula. The Mueller report documented the results of a domestic U.S. investigation into many suspicious links between Trump associates and Russian officials.

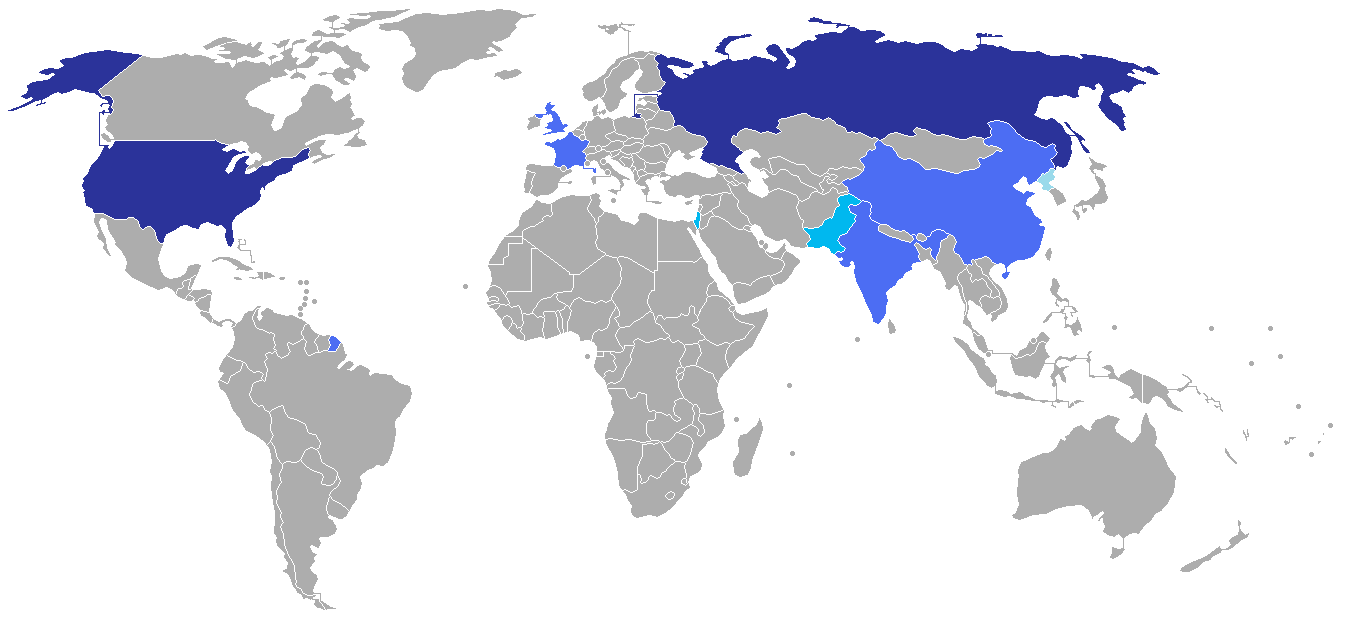
In early 2019, more than 90% of world's 13,865 nuclear weapons were owned by Russia and the United States.

In June 2019, the New York Times reported that hackers from the United States Cyber Command planted malware potentially capable of disrupting the Russian electrical grid. According to Wired senior writer Andy Greenberg, "The Kremlin warned that the intrusions could escalate into a cyberwar between the two countries."

During the 2019 G7 summit in France, Trump unilaterally advocated for Russia's membership to G7 to be reinstated and said he intended to invite Vladimir Putin to the 2020 G7 summit, set to be held in the U.S. Trump also shifted some blame for Russia's 2014 Crimea annexation to his predecessor, President Barack Obama, saying Obama "was pure and simply outsmarted." "It could have been stopped...but President Obama was unable to stop it, and it's too bad," he added.

Trump said the Nord Stream 2 gas pipeline from Russia to Germany, owned by Russia's Gazprom, could turn Germany into a "hostage of Russia". Businesses involved in the Nord Stream 2 have been sanctioned by the Trump administration with the passing of the National Defense Authorization Act for Fiscal Year 2020 on December 20, 2019.

===== Alleged Russian bounty program =====
In June 2020, the New York Times reported that Russian military intelligence had paid bounties to Taliban-linked insurgents for killing U.S. soldiers in Afghanistan. Trump, his Director of National Intelligence John Ratcliffe, and National Security Adviser Robert O'Brien said that Trump had not been briefed "because it was unverified intelligence", but it was later reported that Trump received a written briefing on possible Russian bounties in a February 2020 President's Daily Brief, a document that Trump often does not read. In subsequent conservations with Putin, Trump never raised the reports of the bounty program, saying "that's an issue that many people said was fake news." Some White House officials were aware of the bounty reports by early 2019.

The inclusion of the bounty reports in the President's Daily Brief and (in May 2020) in the CIA's classified World Intelligence Review intelligence compilation demonstrated that the reports, gleaned in part from information collected in raids and interrogations of captured Islamist militants in the War in Afghanistan, was seen as credible by U.S. intelligence officials. The National Security Agency (NSA), which focuses on electronic intelligence-gathering and had been skeptical of human sources, "strongly dissented" from the CIA and Defense Intelligence Agency assessments that the bounty plot is credible and real.

After the National Security Council convened a meeting on the matter in late March 2020, the White House officials were presented with a number of options, including making a diplomatic protest and imposing sanctions, but Trump did not authorize any action. General Kenneth McKenzie, the commander of U.S. Central Command, said that he found no "causative link" between reported bounties to actual U.S. military deaths. Defense Secretary Mark Esper and top military officials mostly played down reports of a bounty program; although the military's investigation remained open as of late December 2020.

On July 1, 2020, following media reports of Taliban participation in an alleged Russian bounty program, the House Armed Services Committee overwhelmingly voted in favor of an amendment to the National Defense Authorization Act for Fiscal Year 2021 (2021 NDAA) to restrict Trump's ability to withdraw U.S. troops from Afghanistan. In a provision of an omnibus appropriations bill enacted in December 2020, Congress pressed the military to further investigate the reports on "Russia's malign activities in Afghanistan" and provide a report to Congress.

In April 2021, after Trump's term ended, the U.S. government reported that the U.S. intelligence community only had "low to moderate confidence" in the bounty program allegations.

=== Spain and Catalan Secessionism ===
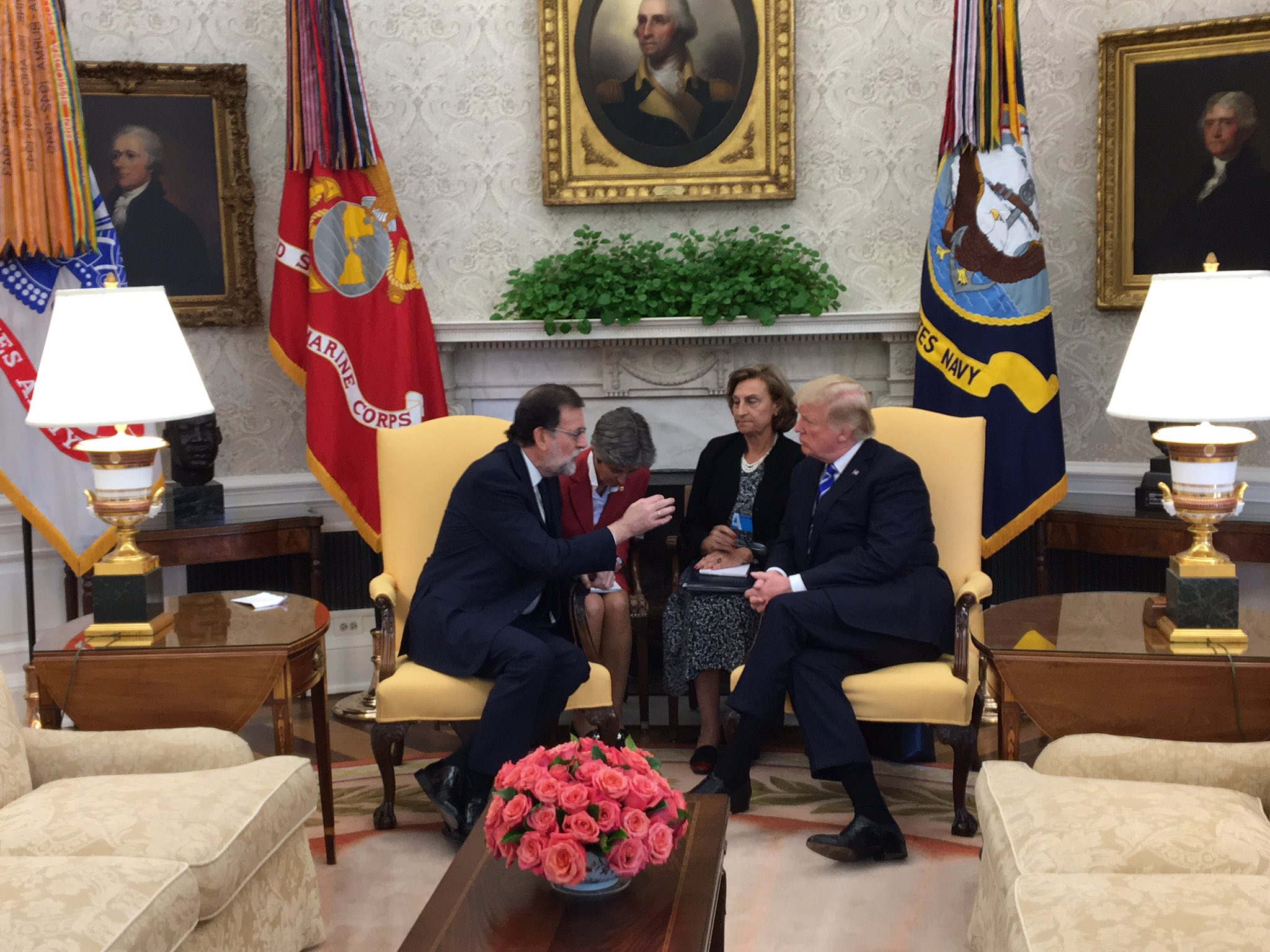
Trump and Spanish prime minister Mariano Rajoy, September 2017

Amid the 2017–2018 Spanish constitutional crisis, during Spanish prime minister Mariano Rajoy's visit to the White House, Trump said on September 26, 2017, that the United States opposed the Catalan independence movement, saying that separation would be "foolish" and that "Spain is a great country, and it should remain united".

On October 27 of the same year, the Parliament of Catalonia approved the unilateral declaration of independence, the U.S. State Department stated: "Catalonia is an integral part of Spain, and the United States supports the Spanish government's constitutional measures to keep Spain strong and united".

=== Ukraine ===
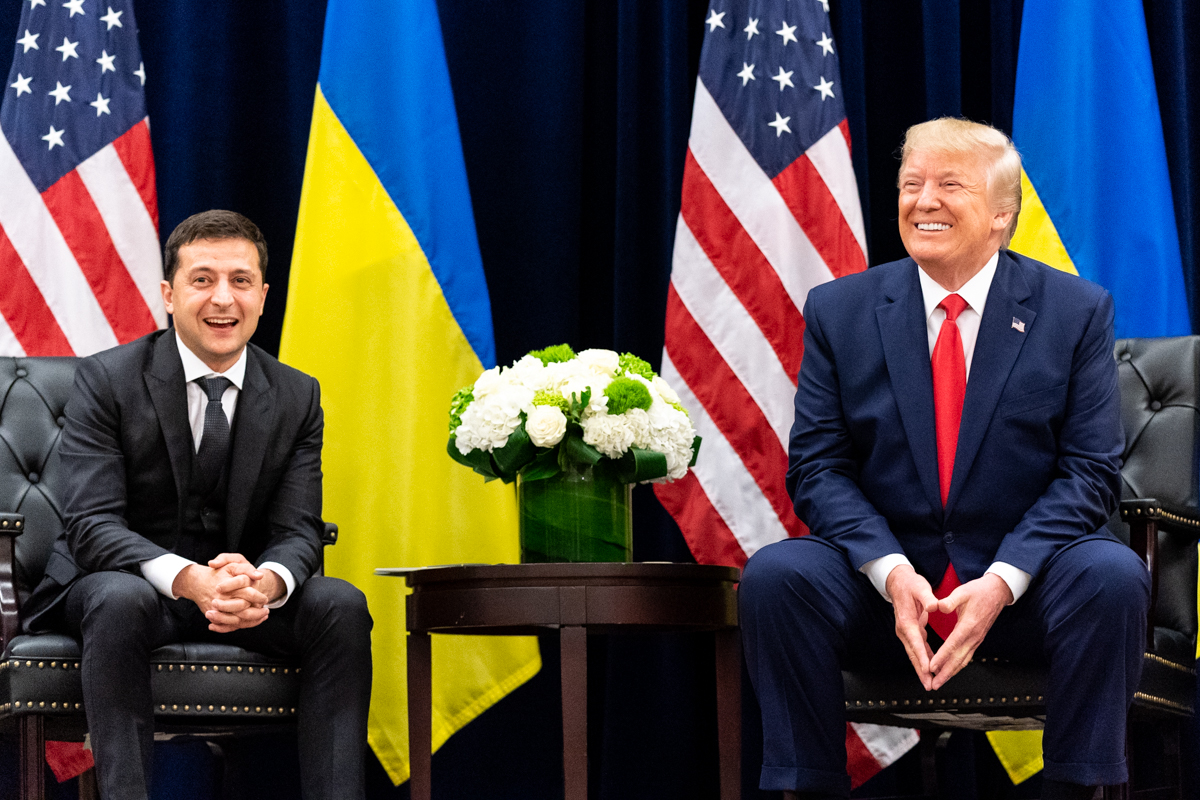
Trump and Ukrainian president Volodymyr Zelenskyy, September 2019

Speaking to the Yalta European Strategy conference in September 2015, Trump criticized Germany and other European countries for not doing enough to support Ukraine in its conflict with Russia, saying, Ukrainians are "not being treated right." However early in the campaign Trump opposed U.S. involvement in the Russo-Ukrainian war, describing Crimea as "Europe's problem;" in a rally in July 2016 he implied that such involvement could have led to World War III and criticized Germany and other European countries for not doing more to support Ukraine. Later in the campaign, however, he stated that he would consider recognizing Crimea as Russian territory. In February 2017 Trump explained that Crimea was taken by Russia by force and asked whether Obama was too soft on Russia.

In August 2015, Trump stated he had no opinion about Ukrainian membership in NATO, saying that both membership and non-membership would be "great".

Since at least May 2019, Trump's personal attorney Rudy Giuliani had been pushing for Volodymyr Zelenskyy, the newly elected president of Ukraine, to investigate the oil company Burisma, whose board of directors includes Joe Biden's son Hunter, as well as to check if there were any irregularities in the Ukrainian investigation of Paul Manafort. He said such investigations would be beneficial to his client, Trump, and that his efforts had Trump's full support. Giuliani met with Ukrainian officials to press this case in June 2019 and August 2019. Meanwhile, the White House put a hold on the distribution of $250 million worth of military aid to Ukraine which Congress had authorized. On September 11 the administration said it had released the money, even as Congress was contemplating bills to force its release.

In September 2019, as reports surfaced of a whistleblower complaint against Trump that may have involved Ukraine, Giuliani conceded he had been pressing the Ukrainian government to investigate the Biden connection. In a later tweet he seemed to confirm reports that Trump had withheld the military assistance funds for Ukraine as a way of forcing them to carry out the investigations. He said, "The reality is that the President of the United States, whoever he is, has every right to tell the president of another country you better straighten out the corruption in your country if you want me to give you a lot of money. If you're so damn corrupt that you can't investigate allegations – our money is going to get squandered."

Trump himself spoke to Zelensky by phone on July 25, 2019, and according to The Wall Street Journal he urged Zelenskyy "about eight times" to work with Giuliani and investigate Biden's son. On September 25, the administration released the White House's five-page, declassified memorandum of the July 25 phone call, which shows Trump repeatedly pressing Zelenskyy to work with Giuliani and U.S. Attorney General William Barr on investigations into the Biden family as well as the cybersecurity company CrowdStrike.

=== United Kingdom ===
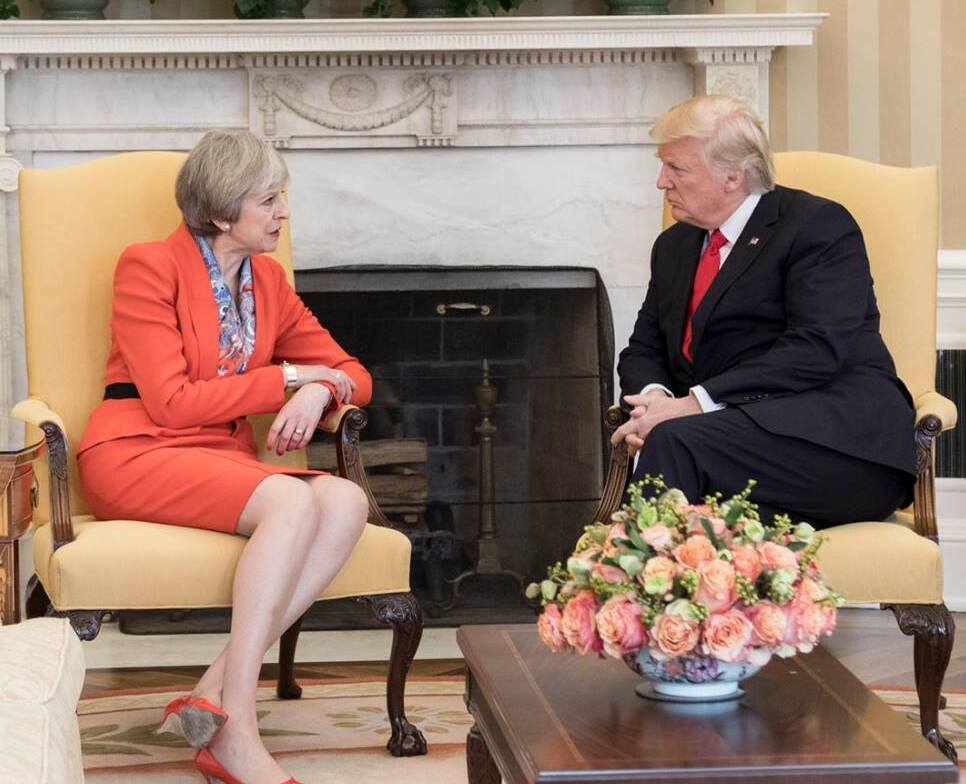
Trump and British prime minister Theresa May, January 2017

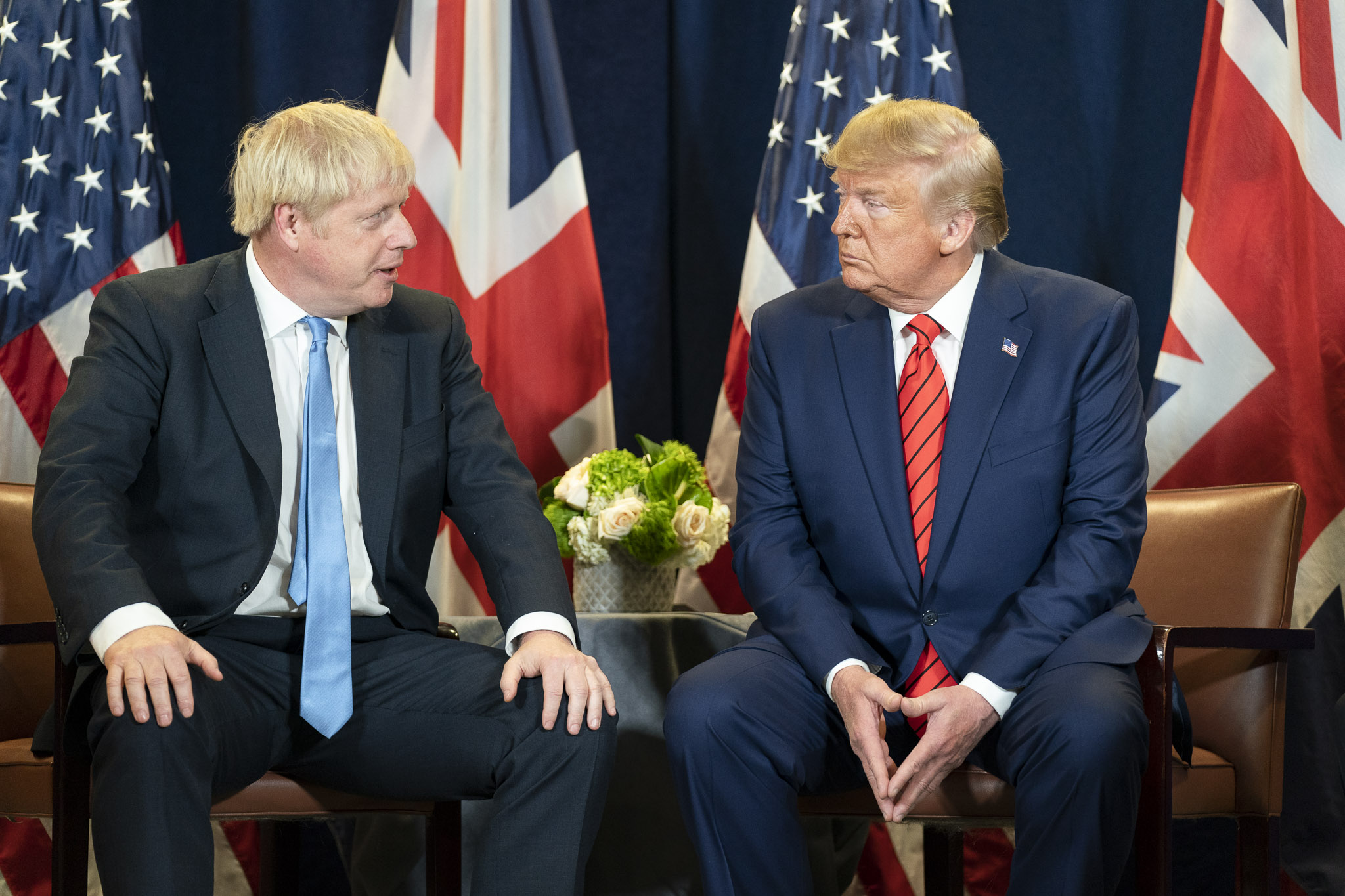
Trump and British prime minister Boris Johnson, September 2019

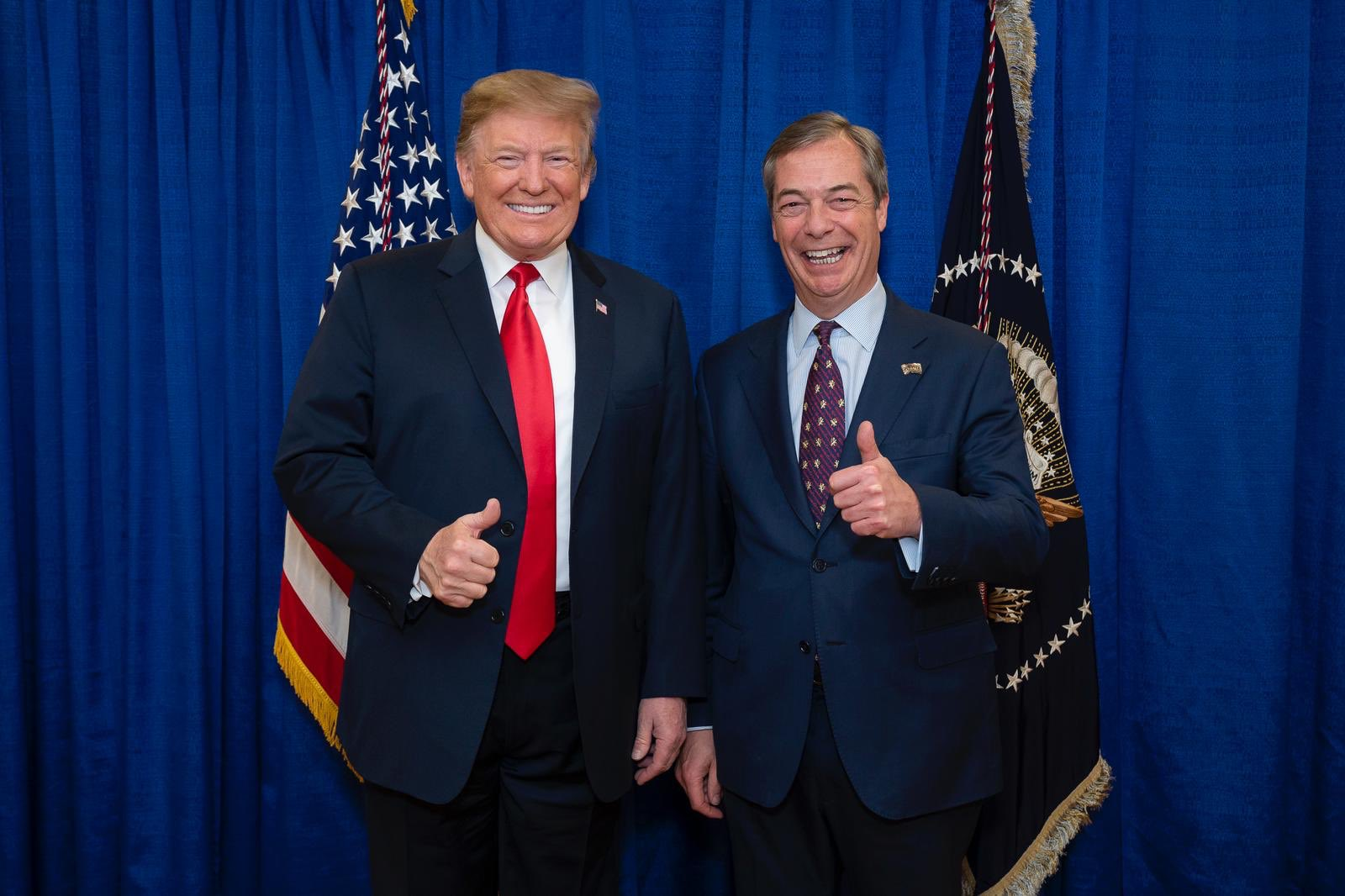
Trump with Brexit leader and political ally Nigel Farage.

During the 2016 campaign, Trump stated his support for British voters voting to leave the European Union. In an interview with Piers Morgan in May 2016, Trump said that UK withdrawal would make no difference to a potential bilateral trade deal between the United Kingdom and the United States if he became president.

On January 27, 2017, Trump met with British prime minister Theresa May, the first foreign leader to visit him at the White House. In the meeting Trump reiterated his support for both countries' involvement in NATO.

In March 2017, White House press secretary Sean Spicer repeated a false claim from Fox News commentator Andrew Napolitano claiming that the British GCHQ had wiretapped Trump Tower. This drew an angry response from the British government, and eventually resulted in an apology from Spicer and the U.S. National Security Advisor H. R. McMaster.

In November 2017, Trump re-tweeted three Islamophobic videos posted by Jayda Fransen, a leader of the British far-right party Britain First. Theresa May's spokesperson condemned Trump, saying "The British people overwhelmingly reject the prejudiced rhetoric of the far-right, which is the antithesis of the values that this country represents — decency, tolerance and respect. It is wrong for the President to have done this." Labour leader Jeremy Corbyn called Trump "abhorrent, dangerous and a threat to our country".

In July 2018, Trump met with Queen Elizabeth II at Windsor Castle.

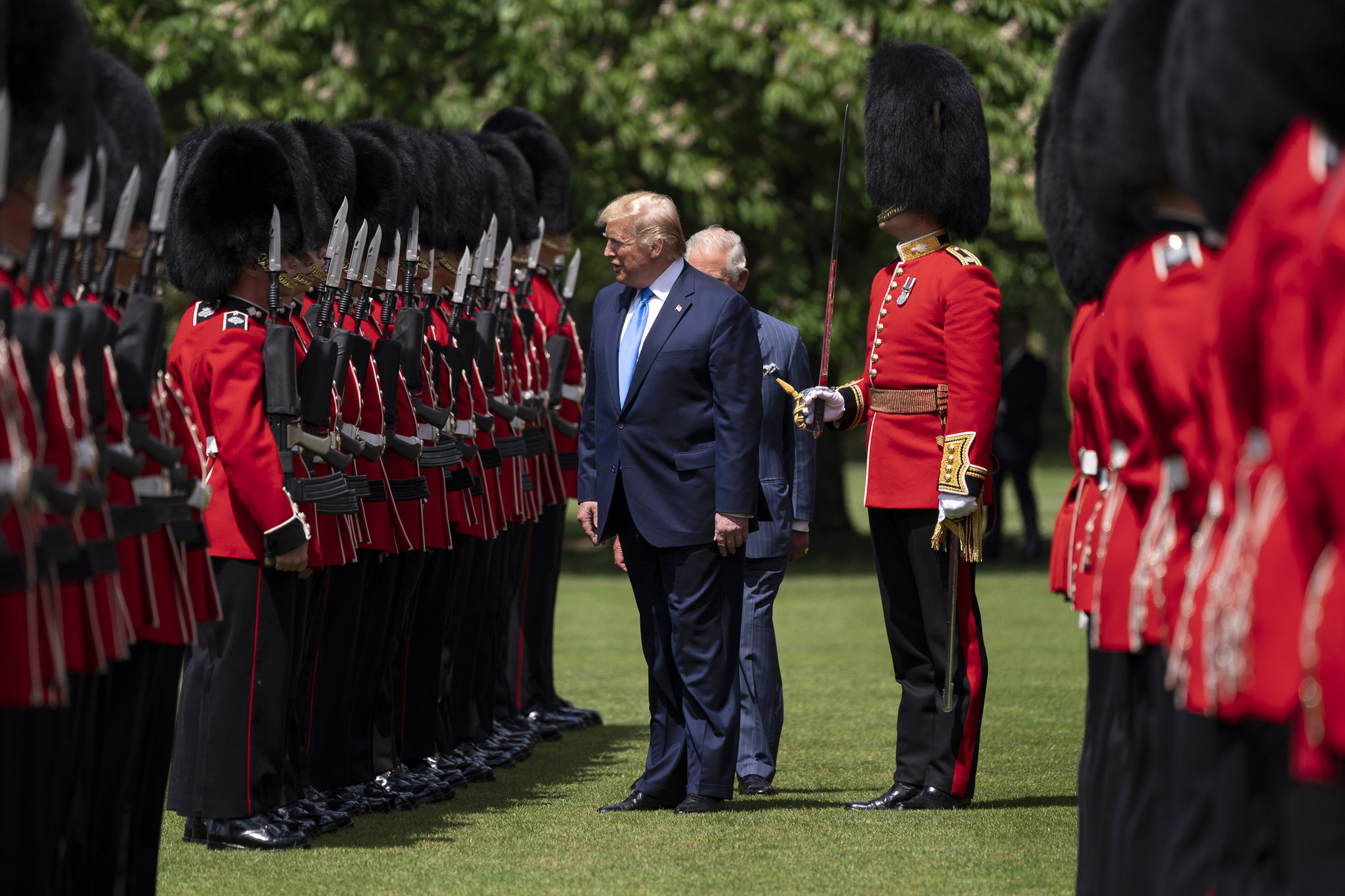
Trump and the Prince of Wales inspect the 1st Battalion, Grenadier Guards in the Garden at Buckingham Palace, June 2019

In June 2019, Trump made a state visit to the UK on behalf of invitation by Queen Elizabeth II.

On July 7, weeks after Trump's state visit to the UK, leaked diplomatic cables revealed candid and unflattering assessments UK Ambassador Kim Darroch made regarding Trump and his administration since 2017, including calling Trump's presidency "diplomatically clumsy and inept" and stating that the president "radiates insecurity," along with suggesting that unproven claims of Trump and his son-in-law Jared Kushner being indebted "to shady Russian moneymen" could "not be ruled out".

Trump subsequently tweeted that Darroch was "not liked or well thought of within the US" and that "we will no longer deal with him" and showed dismay at Prime Minister Theresa May's support of Darroch amidst the diplomatic row. On July 10, Darroch tendered his resignation, writing that "the current situation is making it impossible for me to carry out my role as I would like". A spokesman for the prime minister said that it was an ambassador's job to provide "an honest and unvarnished view" of the U.S. administration. Darroch did not leave his post until 2020.

In July 2019, May was replaced by Boris Johnson, a populist politician, who built a close relationship with Trump.

On November 18, 2019, Secretary Pompeo ratified a treaty with the UK signed in 2003 for the protection of the wreck of the RMS Titanic. UK Maritime Minister Nus Ghani said the UK would work with other North Atlantic countries, like Canada and France, to bring "even more protection" to Titanic.

== Middle East ==
=== Egypt ===
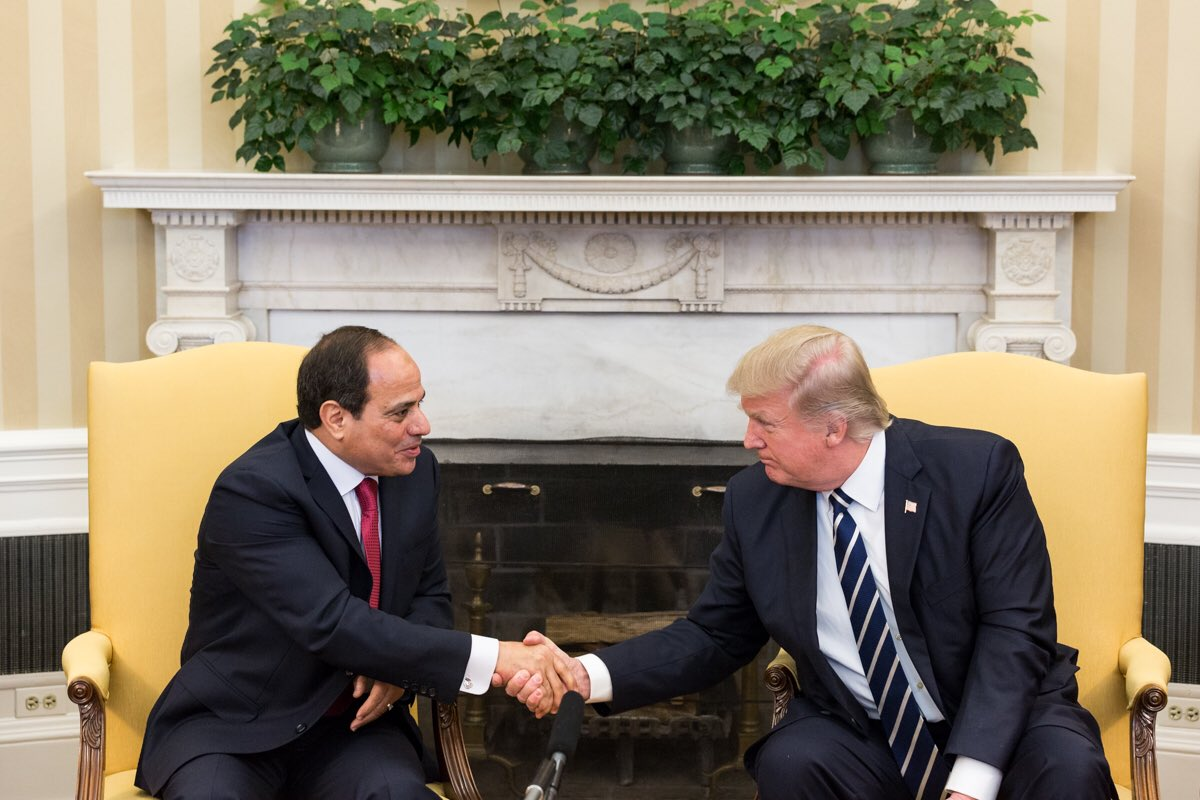
Trump and Egyptian president Abdel Fattah el-Sisi, April 2017

During the 2016 campaign, Trump described the president of Egypt, Abdel Fattah el-Sisi, as a "fantastic guy", praising his handling of various political events in Egypt, such as a massive uprising in late June 2013 in Egypt against former president Mohamed Morsi, which was followed by Morsi being removed from office by el-Sisi on July 3, 2013. Trump said that there was a "good feeling between [them]".

In April 2017, Trump welcomed el-Sisi to the White House, saying "We are very much behind President Sisi – he has done a fantastic job in a very difficult situation" and assuring el-Sisi that "you have a great ally in the US and in me." In contrast, Sisi was never invited to the White House during the Obama administration, which criticized post-Morsi authorities in Egypt, as well as Egypt's human rights record.

=== Iran ===
During the first Trump administration, U.S.–Iran relations deteriorated sharply as Trump abandoned Obama's engagement strategy. The U.S. withdrew from the Iran nuclear deal (JCPOA), reimposed sanctions, and launched a maximum pressure campaign that imposed over 1,500 sanctions and severely damaged Iran's economy. In response, Iran escalated uranium enrichment and ruled out talks. Tensions rose through 2019 with oil tanker attacks, a downed U.S. drone, and cyber retaliation. The crisis peaked in early 2020 after the U.S. killed Iranian General Qasem Soleimani, prompting Iranian missile strikes. Relations remained hostile through the end of Trump's term.

=== Iraq, Syria, and the Islamic State ===
==== Iraq ====
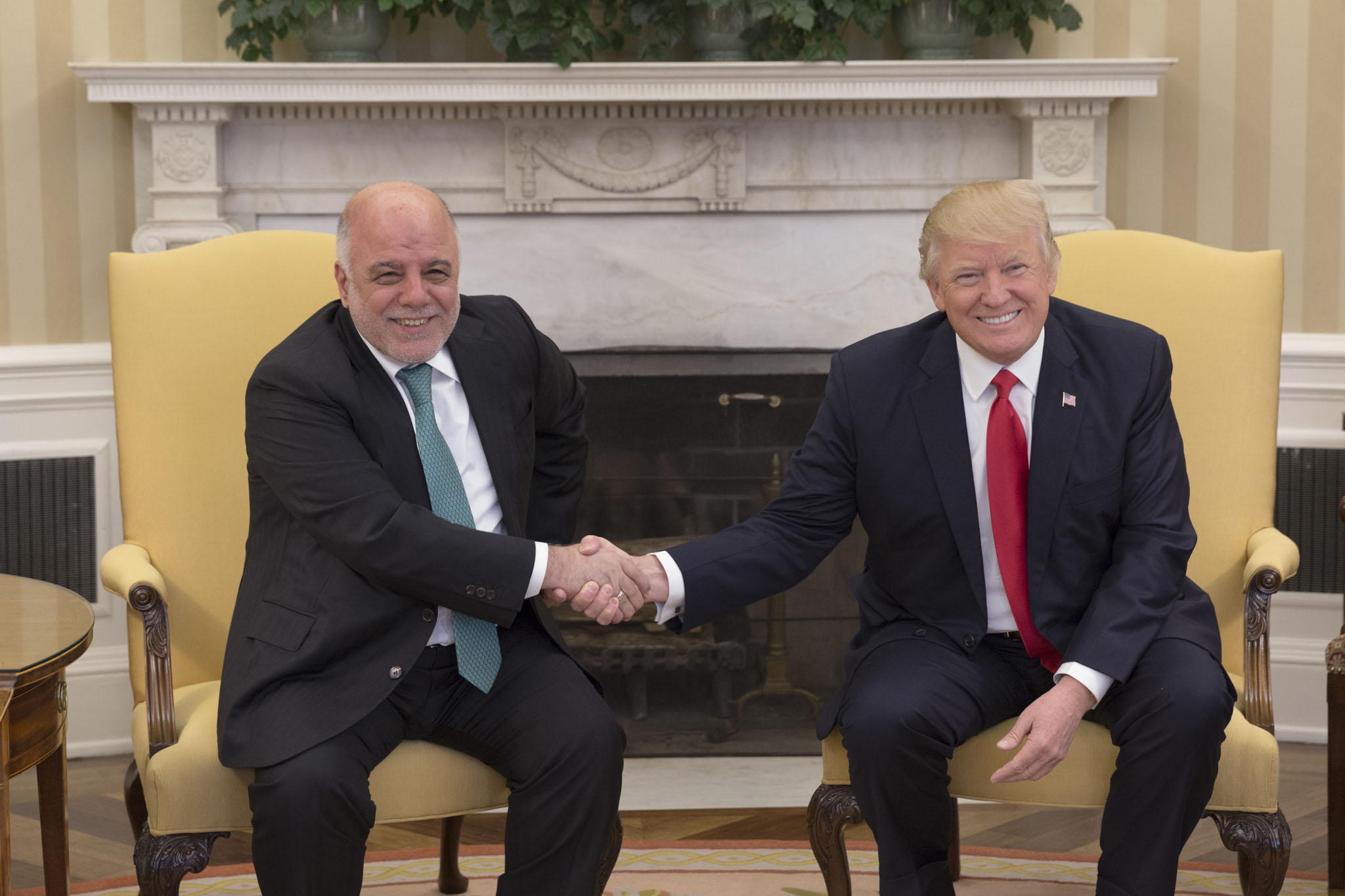
Trump and Iraqi prime minister Haider al-Abadi, March 2017

During the 2016 campaign, Trump repeatedly advocated that the United States should "take the oil" from Iraq as "spoils of war", a decision which would require another invasion and occupation of the country. Trump's statements caused criticism and controversy, as most legal experts agreed that the action would be an illegal war crime under the Geneva Conventions and because many believed that it would increase support for Islamic fundamentalism across the Middle East.

Trump defended his statements by claiming that they would recoup the cost of U.S. military expenditure in Iraq and prevent Iraqi oil infrastructure from falling under ISIL control. Trump reiterated his support for seizing other nations' oil after taking office as president. In January 2017, he said that the United States "should have kept the oil" after the Iraq invasion and "maybe we'll have another chance". Axios reported in 2018 that, as president, Trump had twice brought the issue up with Iraqi prime minister Haider al-Abadi, causing consternation among Trump's advisers.

National Security Adviser H.R. McMaster is reported to have told Trump "We can't do this and you shouldn't talk about it. Because talking about it is just bad ... It's bad for America's reputation, it'll spook allies, it scares everybody," while Secretary of Defense Jim Mattis publicly stated that the United States did not intend "to seize anybody's oil."

In January 2017, Trump issued an executive order banning the entry of all Iraqi citizens, as well as citizens of six other countries. After sharp criticism, public protests, and lawsuits against the executive order, Trump relaxed the travel restrictions somewhat and dropped Iraq from the list of non-entry countries in March 2017.

==== Syria ====
In July 2017, on the advice of then-CIA director Mike Pompeo, Trump ordered a "phasing out" of the CIA's support for anti-Assad Syrian rebels during the Syrian Civil War.

On October 9, 2019, Turkey launched an offensive into northern Syria against the Kurdish-led Autonomous Administration of North and East Syria (Rojava) after Trump shifted his personal support from the Syrian Kurds to Turkey.

In November 2019, Trump approved a mission for U.S. troops to secure the oil fields in eastern Syria. Later that month, Trump said that the remaining American troops in Syria were there "only for the oil", and that the U.S. was "keeping the oil". Seizing oil without local government permission would be a war crime of pillage, but the U.S. military confirmed it was coordinating with Rojava and the Syrian Democratic Forces that controlled the area.

===== Responses to chemical weapons in Syria =====
President Trump addresses the nation after authorizing a missile strike in response to the Khan Shaykhun chemical attack in Syria, April 6, 2017

President Trump addresses the nation after authorizing missile strikes in response to the Douma chemical attack in Syria, April 13, 2018

On April 7, 2017, Trump ordered the United States Navy to launch a cruise missile at Shayrat Air Base in response to the Khan Shaykhun chemical attack. The missile attack had wide international support and was highly praised by the majority of Republicans as well as Democratic senators. The move drew criticism from Russia, whom the United States had warned in advance about the attack. Although Russian anti-missile defenses such as S-300's failed to deter the missile attack, Russian forces suffered minimal damage, as the United States had deliberately avoided striking areas of the base used by Russia. Russian prime minister Dmitry Medvedev criticized the strike as "good news for terrorists".

Trump later addressed the nation from Mar-a-Lago in Florida on the strikes on Syria in April 2017, where he stated "I ordered a targeted military strike on the airfield in Syria from where the chemical attack was launched. It is in this vital national security interest of the United States to prevent and deter the spread and use of deadly chemical weapons. There can be no dispute that Syria used banned chemical weapons, violated its obligations under the Chemical Weapons Convention and ignored the urging of the U.N. Security Council. Years of previous attempts at changing Assad's behavior have all failed and failed very dramatically. As a result the refugee crisis continues to deepen and the region continues to destabilize, threatening the United States and its allies. Tonight I call on all civilized nations to join us in seeking to end the slaughter and bloodshed in Syria and also to end terrorism of all kinds and all types".

According to investigative journalist Bob Woodward, Trump had ordered his defense secretary James Mattis to assassinate Syrian president Bashar al-Assad after the chemical attack in April 2017, but Mattis declined; Trump denied doing so.

In response to the Douma chemical attack in Syria, in April 2018, Trump ordered missile strikes against the Assad regime targeting alleged chemical weapons compounds; the U.S. led strikes were carried out along with the United Kingdom and France.

Trump addressed the nation from the White House on April 13, 2018, of the strikes against Assad's chemical weapon compounds in Syria, stating "I ordered the United States Armed Forces to launch precision strikes on targets associated with the chemical weapons capabilities of Syrian dictator Bashar al-Assad. A combined operation with the armed forces of France and the United Kingdom is now underway. We thank them both." "the Assad regime again deployed chemical weapons to slaughter innocent civilians this time, in the town of Douma, near the Syrian capital of Damascus. This massacre was a significant escalation in a pattern of chemical weapons use by that very terrible regime".

Announcing troop withdrawal from Syria in December 2018, Trump stated on Twitter that defeating ISIL was "my only reason" for a military presence in Syria, seemingly disregarding the previous missions to respond to Assad's use of chemical weapons.

==== Responses to the Islamic State ====
===== During the 2016 campaign =====
During the presidential campaign in 2015, Trump frequently changed his positions on how to defeat the Islamic State of Iraq and the Levant (ISIL).

In June 2015, when asked how he would deal with Iraq's condemnation of strikes on their oil fields, Trump replied that Iraq is a corrupt country that is not deserving of his respect and that he would "bomb the hell" out of Iraqi oil fields controlled by ISIL.

After formally announcing his candidacy on June 16, 2015, Trump's first interview was with Bill O'Reilly on The O'Reilly Factor the following day. He suggested a hands-off approach to the Syrian Civil War: "Iran and Russia are protecting Syria and it's sort of amazing that we're in there fighting ISIS in Syria so we're helping the head of Syria Bashar al-Assad who is not supposed to be our friend although he looks a lot better than some of our so-called friends." Instead of fighting ISIL in Syria, Trump suggested "maybe Syria should be a free zone for ISIS, let them fight and then you pick up the remnants."

In a Republican primary debate on November 10, 2015, Trump said he "got to know Vladimir Putin very well because we were both on '60 Minutes', we were stable mates, we did well that night." Trump said he approved of the Russian military intervention in Syria, stating: "If Putin wants to knock the hell out of ISIS, I'm all for it 100 percent and I can't understand how anybody would be against that ... He's going in and we can go in and everybody should go in." During his speech at the Oklahoma State Fair, Trump accused his opponents of wanting to "start World War III over Syria."

In the aftermath of the November 2015 Paris attacks committed by ISIL, Trump reiterated his position on ISIL, as he had stated the day before the attack that he would "bomb the shit out of 'em" and that he would "blow up the [oil] pipes, I'd blow up the refineries, and you know what, you'll get Exxon to come in there in two months... and I'd take the oil." Trump said that, to combat ISIL, "I would find you a proper general. I would find a Patton or a MacArthur. I would hit them so hard your head would spin." Trump said in an interview with Anderson Cooper the day of the Paris attacks: "There is no Iraq. Their leaders are corrupt." In the March 11, 2016, CNN Republican presidential debate, he said he would send ground troops to fight ISIL, saying: "We really have no choice. We have to knock out ISIS."

In a 2015 interview, Trump stated "You have to take out their families, when you get these terrorists, you have to take out their families. ... When they say they don't care about their lives, you have to take out their families." When pressed on what "take out" meant, Trump said the U.S. should "wipe out their homes" and "where they came from." Critics noted that the intentional targeting of non-combatants is a violation of the Geneva Conventions and other aspects of the international law of war. Jonathan Russell, head of policy for the anti-radicalization think tank Quilliam, warned that Trump's "anti-Muslim rhetoric" helps ISIL's "narrative", saying "Trump will contribute to Islamist radicalization as his comments will make Muslims feel unwelcome in America."

During his presidential campaign, Trump repeatedly criticized the battle to liberate Mosul from ISIL control, saying that the United States is "not going to benefit" from dislodging ISIL from the Iraqi city. Trump repeatedly asserted that U.S. and Iraqi military leaders should have used "the element of surprise" to attack Mosul rather than announcing plans beforehand. He also said that U.S. military planners were "a group of losers" for not doing so. Some U.S. military officials openly rebuked Trump's comments, saying that "it is nearly impossible to move tens of thousands of troops into position without alerting the enemy" and asserting that it was vital to warn civilians of impending military action.

===== After inauguration =====
====== 2017 ======
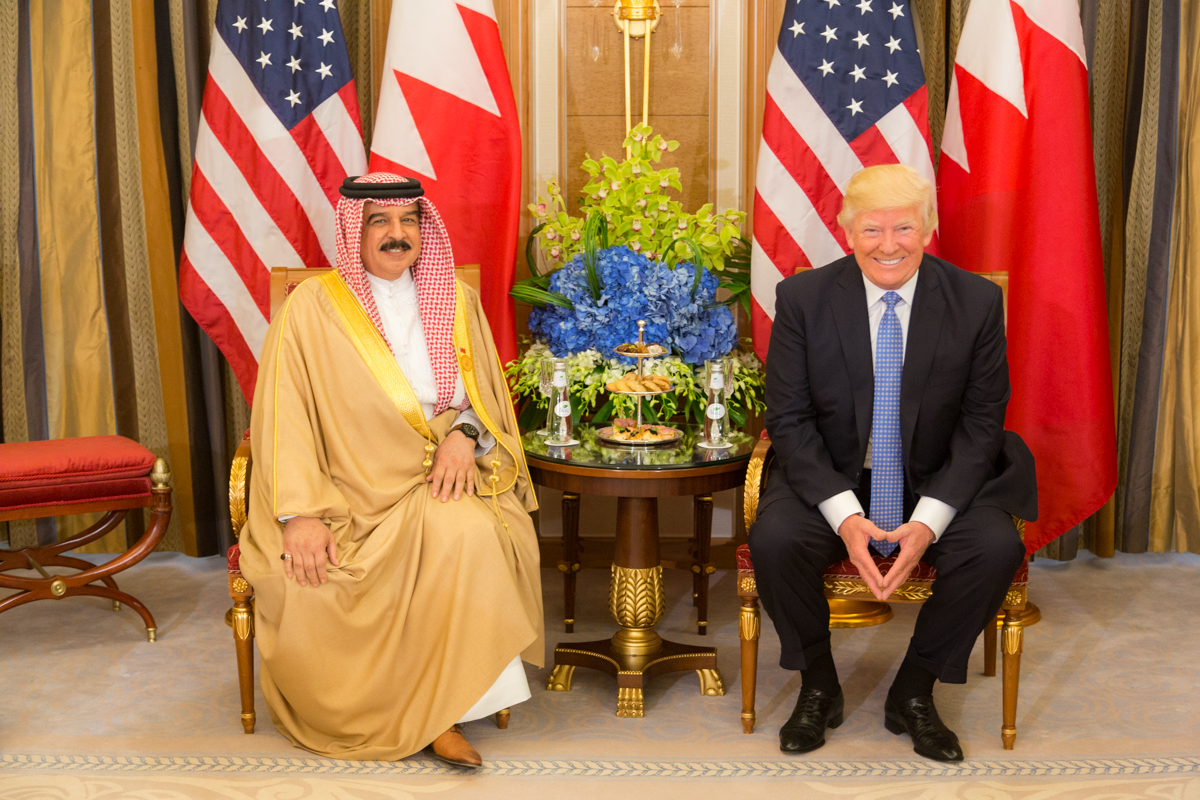
Trump meets with King Hamad bin Isa Al Khalifa of Bahrain, May 2017

With the arrival of the Trump administration, a change in policy was instituted regarding the disclosure of troop levels abroad as well as the timing of any additional deployments to the Middle East, following through on his campaign promises to utilize the "element of surprise". By April 2017, there had been two non-disclosed troop deployments in the month of March: a deployment of 400 U.S. Marines to northern Syria and 300 U.S. Army paratroopers to the area around Mosul, Iraq. By April 2, 2017, the U.S. troop level, or "force management level" — the number of full-time troops deployed, was around 5,200 in Iraq and 500 in Syria, with about 1,000 more troops there on a temporary basis.

The Syria deployment put more conventional U.S. troops on a front that, until then, had primarily used special operations units. The 400 Marines were part of the 11th MEU from the Battalion Landing Team 1st Battalion, 4th Marines. They manned an artillery battery whilst additional infantrymen from the unit provided security and resupplies were handled by part of the expeditionary force's combat logistics element.

In August 2017, Special Presidential Envoy for the Global Coalition to Counter ISIL Brett H. McGurk stated that the Trump administration had "dramatically accelerated" the U.S.–led campaign against ISIL, citing estimates that almost one-third of the territory taken from ISIL "has been won in the last six months." McGurk favorably cited "steps President Trump has taken, including delegating decision–making authority from the White House to commanders in the field."

Some right-wing populist media figures who supported Trump during the election criticized his apparent policy reversal on the Middle East after the increased anti-ISIL commitment. Ann Coulter stated that Trump "campaigned on not getting involved in Mideast" arguing that it was one of the reasons many voted for him.

====== 2018 ======
On December 11, 2018, anti-ISIL envoy Brett McGurk indicated in a press briefing that the war against ISIL in Syria was not over, stating, "It would be reckless if we were just to say, well, the physical caliphate is defeated, so we can just leave now." On December 17, 2018, James Jeffrey, the United States Special Representative for Syria Engagement, stated in an address to the Atlantic Council that the United States would remain in Syria "a very long time."

On December 19, Trump, declaring "we have won against ISIS," unilaterally announced a "total" withdrawal of the 2,000–2,500 U.S. troops in Syria. The announcement was made on Twitter and the decision was apparently made without prior consultation with Congress, military commanders, civilian advisors, or allies. Although no timetable was provided at the time, press secretary Sarah Sanders indicated that the withdrawal had been ordered to begin. The Pentagon and State Department tried to change Trump's mind on the decision, with several of his congressional and political allies expressing concerns about the sudden move, specifically that it would "hand control of the region" to Russia and Iran, and "abandon" America's Kurdish allies. Brian Kilmeade of the Fox & Friends news program, which Trump himself often watches, sharply criticized Trump's decision as "totally irresponsible", adding "nobody thinks ISIS is defeated" and that the president had "blindsided" the Pentagon and State Department.

Immediately after Trump's announcement, Defense Secretary Jim Mattis unsuccessfully tried persuading Trump to reconsider, then informed the president on December 20 he would resign from his post. Mattis asked to continue in his position through February to continue defending "the Department's interests" at Congressional and NATO meetings while Trump selected a successor. Two days later, McGurk announced he was also exiting as a consequence of Trump's decision. (McGurk had previously said he would leave in February, but as the result of the Syria withdrawal and Mattis' departure, he moved his own departure earlier to December 31.) In response, Trump wrote that he did not know McGurk and questioned if McGurk was a "grandstander".

On December 23, Trump announced on Twitter that Deputy Secretary of Defense Patrick Shanahan would become Acting Secretary of Defense effective January 1, thereby replacing Mattis two months' earlier than Mattis' requested resignation date. On December 30, Senator Lindsey Graham, a known Congressional confidant of the president, said that the decision was "a stain on the honor of the United States," and that while he agrees that it's possible to reduce the American footprint in Afghanistan, Syria, and Iraq, the US must keep troops in Syria to ensure ISIL can't regroup. Graham also said that he and a group of generals would urge Trump to reconsider his withdrawal plans during a luncheon later that day.

====== 2019 ======
One week after this announcement, Trump asserted he would not approve any extension of the American deployment in Syria. On January 6, 2019, national security advisor John Bolton added conditions to the pullout, announcing America would remain in Syria until ISIL is eradicated and until Turkey guarantees it would not strike America's Kurdish allies.

On February 22, 2019, the administration stated that instead of the initially announced "total" pullout, 400 U.S. troops would remain in Syria indefinitely to serve as a contingency force. About 200 of those would be a part of a larger multinational "observer force". Press secretary Sarah Sanders initially characterized the troops as "peacekeepers", although a senior administration official later disputed that label as the term technically implied restricted rules of engagement. The shift from a total to a partial withdrawal came after Chairman of the Joint Chiefs of Staff Joseph Dunford strongly vouched for it as French and British allies declined to remain in Syria unless America did. After the announcement, The New York Times quoted officials as describing a "surreal atmosphere" at the Pentagon among military leaders overseeing Syrian policy. A bipartisan group of members of Congress wrote Trump a letter on February 22 endorsing a "small American stabilizing force" in Syria. Trump responded by writing directly on the letter, "I agree 100%. ALL is being done."

On February 28, while speaking to troops at Joint Base Elmendorf-Richardson in Alaska during a refueling stop from Hanoi, Trump asserted that the Islamic State had lost "100 percent" of its territory that it once controlled in Syria. The assertion was false, as the Battle of Baghuz Fawqani was still ongoing, and the Islamic State still held territory in the Syrian Desert as well as the town of Al-Baghuz Fawqani.

On March 22, 2019, in response to developments in the Battle of Baghuz Fawqani, where ISIL was still putting up stubborn resistance to the SDF, Trump showed reporters two maps comparing the extents of the Islamic State's occupation of Syria and Iraq, stating "Here's ISIS on Election Day. Here's ISIS right now." The "election day" map was actually from 2014, when the Islamic State was at its greatest territorial extent, and just as the U.S.-led coalition had begun pushing back against ISIL. The battle concluded on March 23, the next day, with the SDF militia's victory over ISIL. Trump administration officials and allies cautiously hailed the territorial collapse of the Islamic State in Syria while stressing the need to keep a presence in the country to keep up pressure and to stop a territorial resurgence of the Islamic State.

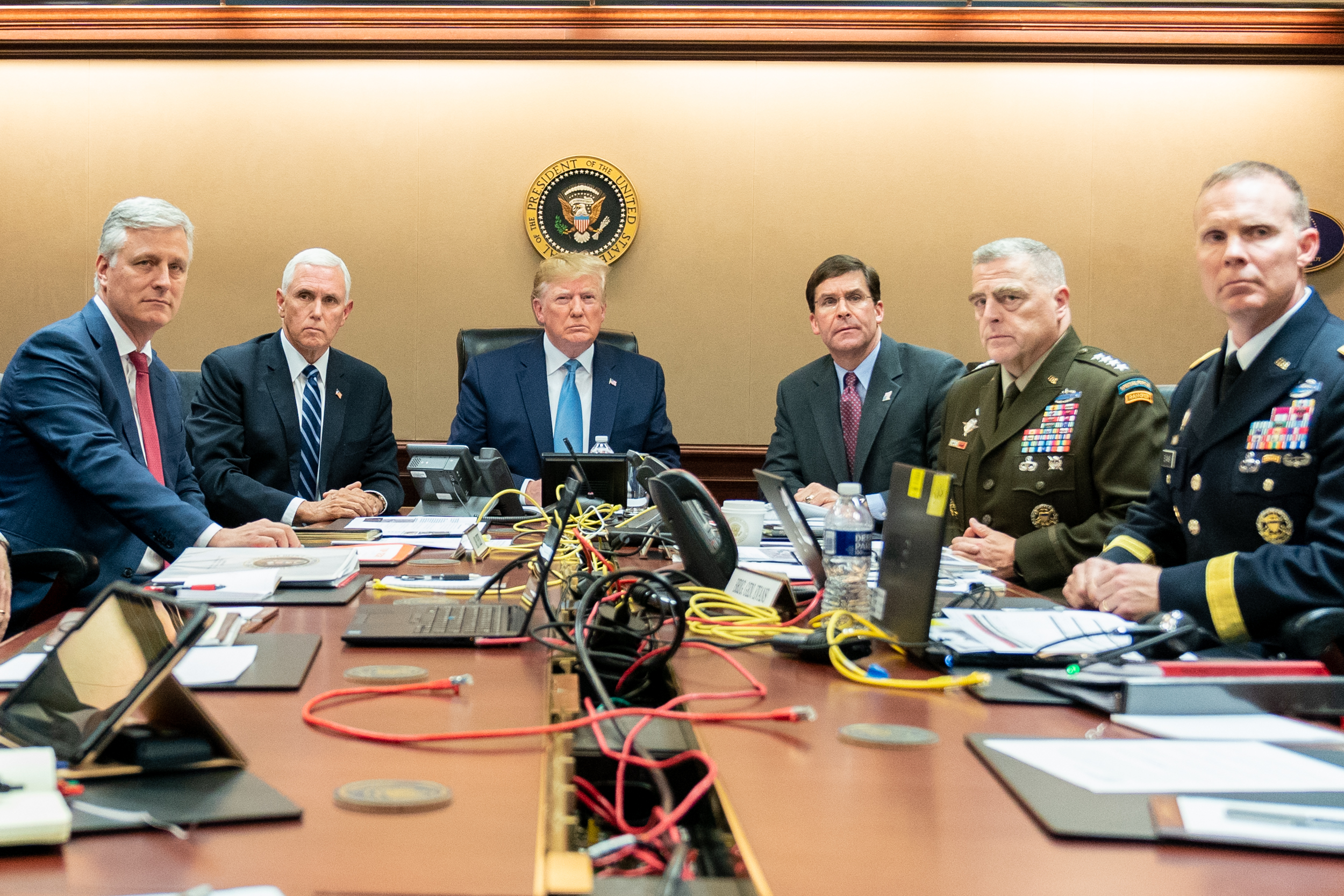
President Trump, with key civilian and military officials, observe the Barisha raid against ISIL in the White House Situation Room, October 26, 2019

President Trump announces the death of Abu Bakr al-Baghdadi, October 27, 2019

From 2011, a reward of $10 million was offered for Abu Bakr al-Baghdadi, the leader of the Islamic State, by the US State Department, increasing to $25 million in 2017, for information or intelligence on his whereabouts to enable capture, dead or alive. On October 27, 2019, he killed himself and two children by detonating a suicide vest during the Barisha raid conducted by the US Delta Force in Syria's northwestern Idlib Province. Trump later announced the death, stating that al-Baghdadi "died after running into a dead-end tunnel, whimpering and crying and screaming all the way", despite only having seen drone footage without audio.

====== Northeastern Syria ======
In October 2019, Trump ordered the Pentagon to withdraw U.S. troops from northeastern Syria to allow Turkey to conduct a planned military operation against Autonomous Administration of North and East Syria and the Kurdish-led Syrian Democratic Forces, which had been supporting the U.S. against ISIL since 2014. The sudden announcement on the night of October 6 came after a Trump telephone call with Turkish president Recep Tayyip Erdogan. U.S. troops reportedly began withdrawing from some positions in northern Syria on October 7.

Similar to their reaction to Trump's initial December 2018 withdrawal announcement, Pentagon officials claimed they were "completely blindsided" by the order and drew concerns about the apparent sudden reneging of the U.S.'s alliance with the Syrian Kurds. The withdrawal was harshly criticized by Congress members of both parties, including Republicans who usually defend Trump. Senator Lindsey Graham called the decision "shortsighted and irresponsible" and threatened to introduce a Senate resolution opposing the pullout. Senator Mitch McConnell said "A precipitous withdrawal of U.S. forces from Syria would only benefit Russia, Iran, and the Assad regime."

Trump defended his withdrawal order, stating that the Kurdish-Turkish conflict "has nothing to do with us" and described the situation as "strategically brilliant" for the U.S. According to Jim Sciutto's book The Madman Theory, the former Deputy Secretary of Defense for the Middle East Mick Mulroy said that the decision ran contrary to one of the main tenants of the National Defense Strategy of building and maintaining partners, that the YPG elements of the SDF were only ones capable of providing the combat leadership needed to defeat ISIL, and that the Commander of the SDF, General Mazloum Abdi, sent a letter to U.S. service members essentially absolving them of the decision of Trump, as he knew they would never have abandoned them.

Trump expounded on his opinion of the Kurds while defending his decision to withdraw American troops, arguing that the U.S.'s commitment to them is overblown and stating that they "didn't help us in the Second World War, they didn't help us with Normandy as an example". Trump continued that "Alliances are very easy. But our alliances have taken advantage of us" and decried the Kurds as "no angels". According to media fact checking, Trump made false or misleading statements while defending his decision-making, such as suggesting that the Kurdistan Workers' Party (PKK)—which Turkey, the EU, the UK, Canada and other nations designate as a terrorist group—"is probably worse at terror and more of a terrorist threat in many ways than ISIS". According to The New York Times, in 2018, ISIL conducted more than six times more attacks and more than 15 times more killings than the PKK, while the PKK's recorded attacks throughout its history are less than half of ISIL's, despite the PKK having existed for six times longer.

Amidst the U.S. withdrawal, he observed that the Kurds "are much safer right now", although Turkey had stated it had killed 150 Kurdish fighters by October 16, while the Kurds stated that almost 200,000 of their people had been displaced by the offensive at that point. Trump also falsely accused the Kurds of having deliberately released ISIL militants from prisons.

On October 13, Trump ordered that the remaining ~1,000 U.S. troops in northern Syria also be withdrawn, but the al-Tanf base in southeastern Syria would remain garrisoned. By November 2019, it had been announced that U.S. troops would remain in eastern Syria to work alongside the Syrian Democratic Forces in securing oil and gas fields against ISIL attacks. Trump approved and supported the mission, lauding that the U.S. "has secured the Oil, & the ISIS Fighters are double secured by Kurds & Turkey."

=== Israel and Israeli–Palestinian conflict ===
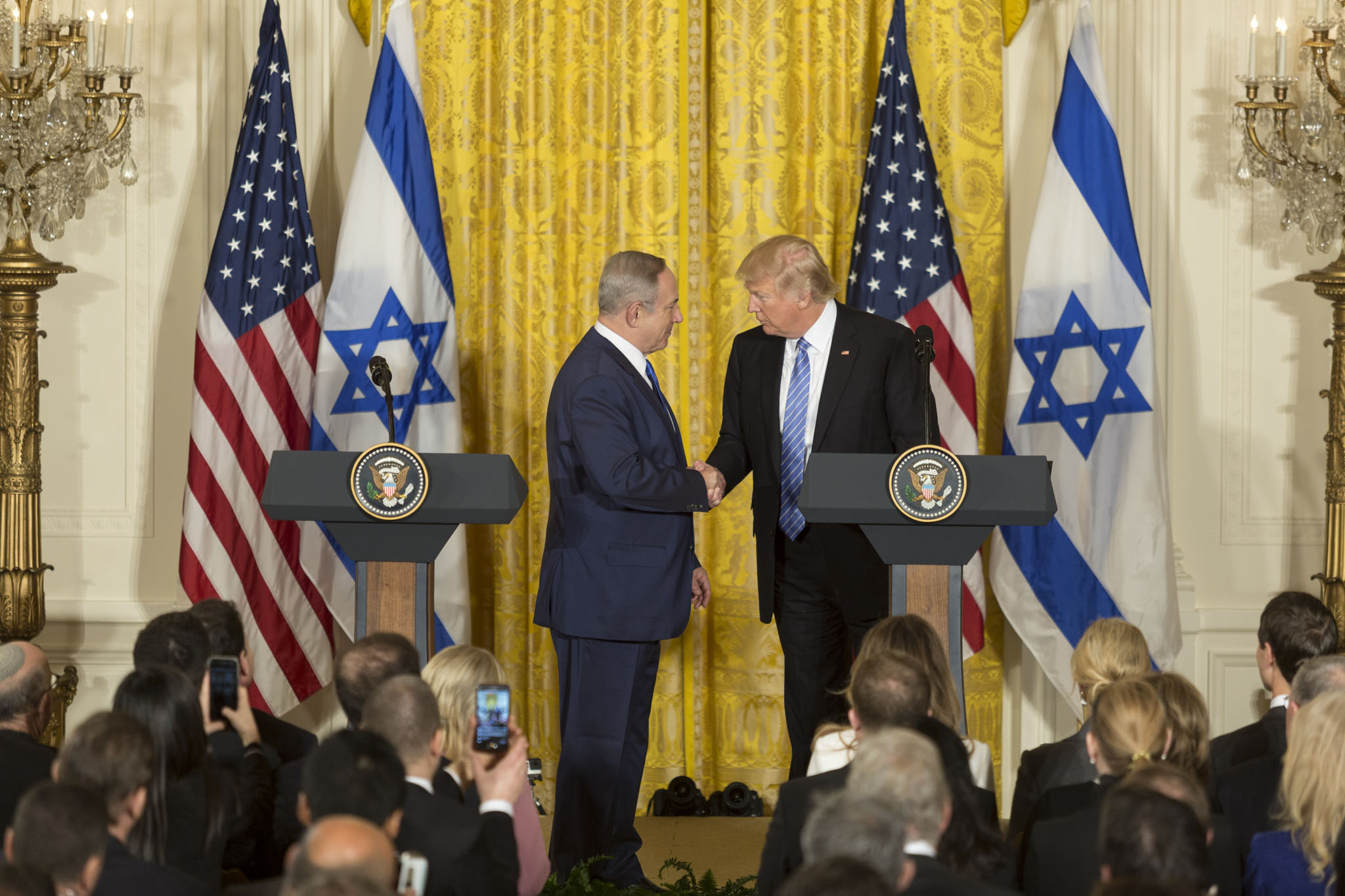
Trump and Israeli prime minister Benjamin Netanyahu, February 2017

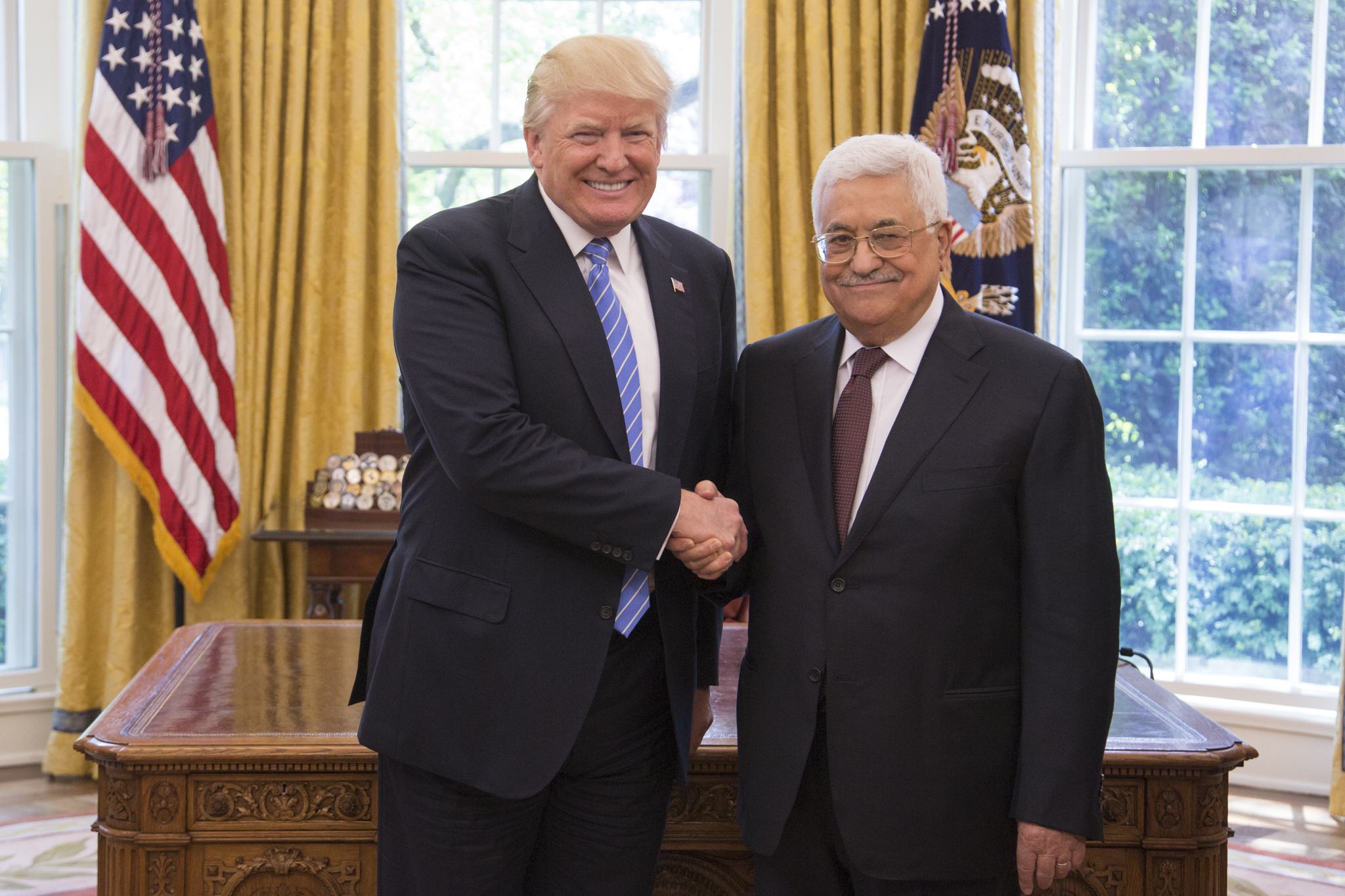
Trump and President of the Palestinian Authority Mahmoud Abbas, May 2017

==== During the 2016 campaign ====
Trump was critical of the Obama administration's treatment of Israel, stating that "Israel has been totally mistreated."

In December 2015, Trump said that he would not take sides in any Israeli-Palestinian agreement in order to be a neutral negotiator in the peace talks, although he also added that he was "totally pro-Israel." In December 2015, Trump told the Associated Press that an Israeli-Palestinian peace accord would depend very much upon Israel, remarking: "I have a real question as to whether or not both sides want to" come to a peace accord. "A lot will have to do with Israel and whether or not Israel wants to make the deal — whether or not Israel's willing to sacrifice certain things."

In March 2016, Trump criticized the Palestinian National Authority for the absence of peace, saying: "the Palestinian Authority has to recognize Israel's right to exist as a Jewish state. …[and they] have to stop the terror, stop the attacks, stop the teaching of hatred...they have to stop the teaching of children to aspire to grow up as terrorists, which is a real problem. Of course, the recognition of Israel's right to exist as a Jewish state is also a major sticking point, with the current Palestinian leadership repeatedly refusing to meet that basic condition."

In a speech to AIPAC, Trump vowed that as president he will veto a United Nations-imposed Israel-Palestine peace agreement, stating: "When I'm president, believe me, I will veto any attempt by the U.N. to impose its will on the Jewish state. It will be vetoed 100 percent." He added that "The Palestinians must come to the table knowing that the bond between the United States and Israel is absolutely, totally unbreakable."

Early in the campaign Trump refused to say whether he supported Israel's position that Jerusalem is its undivided capital. But he later said on multiple occasions that if elected president he would move the U.S. embassy in Israel from Tel Aviv to Jerusalem, which he described as the "eternal capital of the Jewish people." He repeated this pledge after a meeting with Benjamin Netanyahu in September 2016

Trump broke with long-standing bipartisan U.S. policy that Israel should stop building additional Israeli settlements in the West Bank as a precursor to negotiations with the Palestinians, saying that the Israelis "have to keep going" and "I don't think there should be a pause."

==== Trump Administration ====
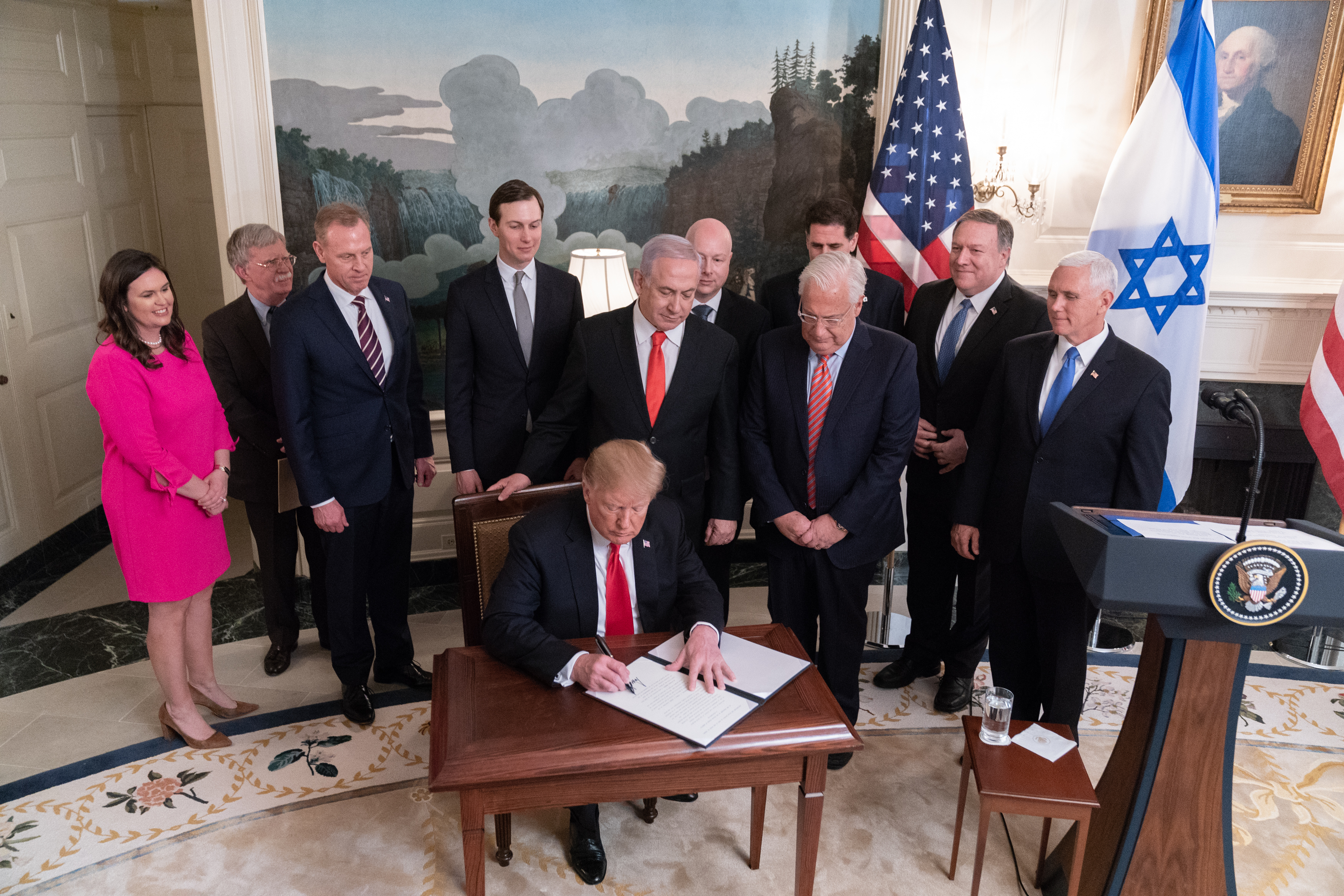
Trump, joined by Israeli prime minister Benjamin Netanyahu behind, signs the proclamation recognizing Israel's 1981 annexation of the Golan Heights, March 25, 2019

In February 2017, Trump said that he could live with either a two-state solution or a one-state solution to the Israeli–Palestinian conflict. This represented a break with the previous bipartisan foreign policy consensus of support for the two-state solution. On May 22, 2017, Trump was the first U.S. president to visit the Western Wall in Jerusalem, during his first foreign trip, visiting Saudi Arabia, Israel, Italy, the Vatican, and Belgium.

On December 6, 2017, Trump officially recognized Jerusalem as the capital of Israel, despite objections from Palestinian leaders. Trump added that he would initiate the process of establishing a new U.S. embassy in Jerusalem, fulfilling the Jerusalem Embassy Act, which had been passed by a bipartisan congressional supermajority in 1995. The United States Embassy officially relocated to Jerusalem on May 14, 2018, to coincide with the 70th anniversary of the Israeli Declaration of Independence.

Israeli officials lobbied Trump into recognizing "Israeli sovereignty" over the Golan Heights.

===== Israeli–Arab normalization agreements =====
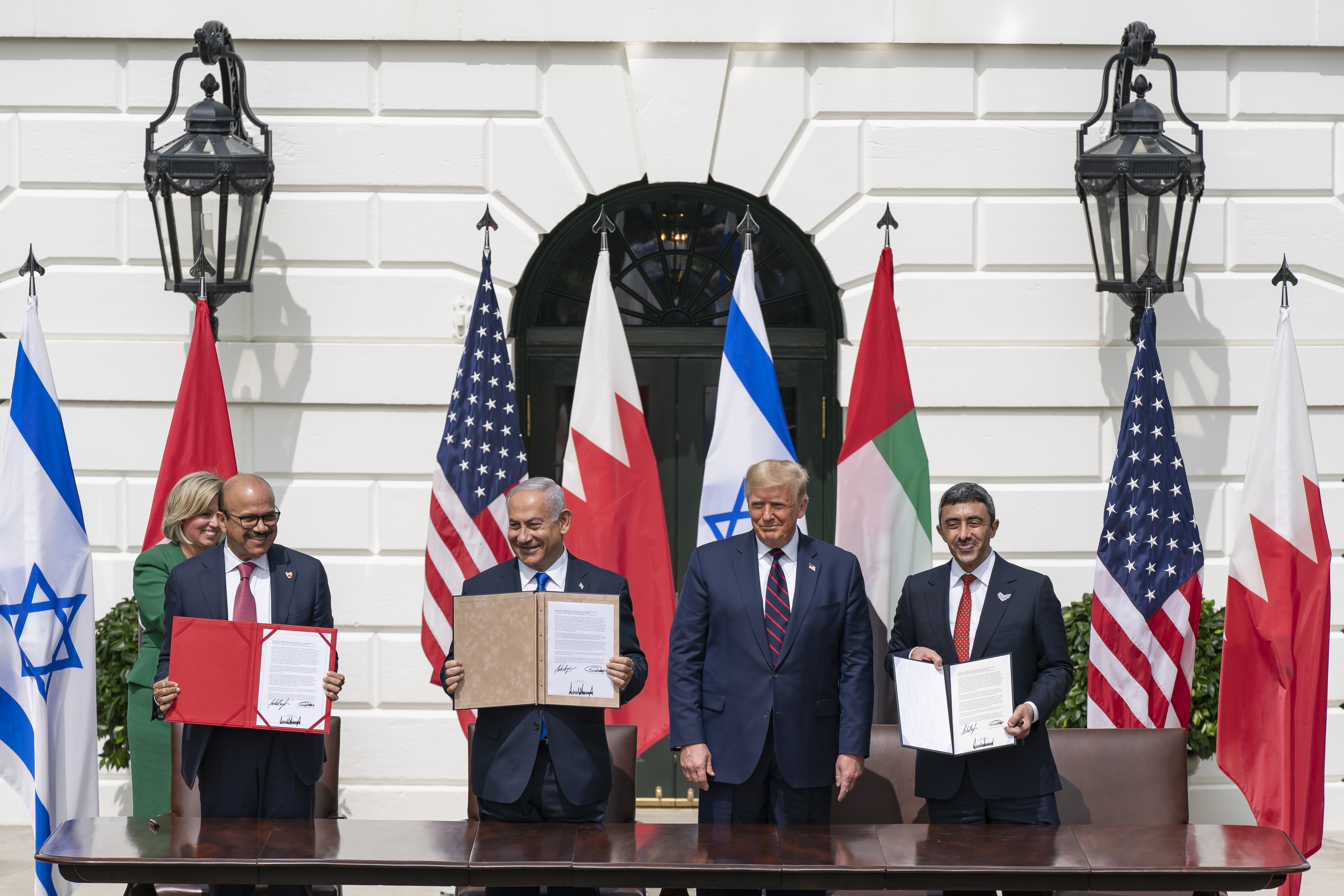
Trump at the White House Abraham Accords signing ceremony, September 15, 2020

On August 13, 2020, the Israel–United Arab Emirates normalization agreement was finalized between Israel and the United Arab Emirates (UAE). Jared Kushner, the primary official negotiating the agreement, stated that the deal would make the Middle East more peaceful and hopeful, which would mean fewer American troops would need to be deployed in the region. Secretary of State Mike Pompeo said the deal was an important step toward stabilizing the region and was good for the whole world.

A joint statement issued by Trump, Israeli prime minister Benjamin Netanyahu, and Abdullah bin Zayed Al Nahyan, read: "This historic diplomatic breakthrough will advance peace in the Middle East region and is a testament to the bold diplomacy and vision of the three leaders and the courage of the United Arab Emirates and Israel to chart a new path that will unlock the great potential in the region." The UAE and Israel moved to establish full diplomatic ties after Israel agreed to suspend a plan to annex parts of the occupied Palestinian territories in the West Bank. The UAE said it would continue to support the Palestinian people and that the agreement would maintain the prospect of a two-state solution between Israel and Palestine.

Subsequently, the term "Abraham Accords" was used to refer collectively to agreements between Israel and the United Arab Emirates and Bahrain, respectively (the Bahrain–Israel normalization agreement). The Accords, which were later expanded via the Israel–Sudan normalization agreement and Israel–Morocco normalization agreement, have been described by The New York Times and the Associated Press as one of Trump's most significant foreign policy accomplishments.

=== Libya ===
The Trump administration continued the Obama administration's counter-Islamic State operations in Libya.

=== Morocco ===
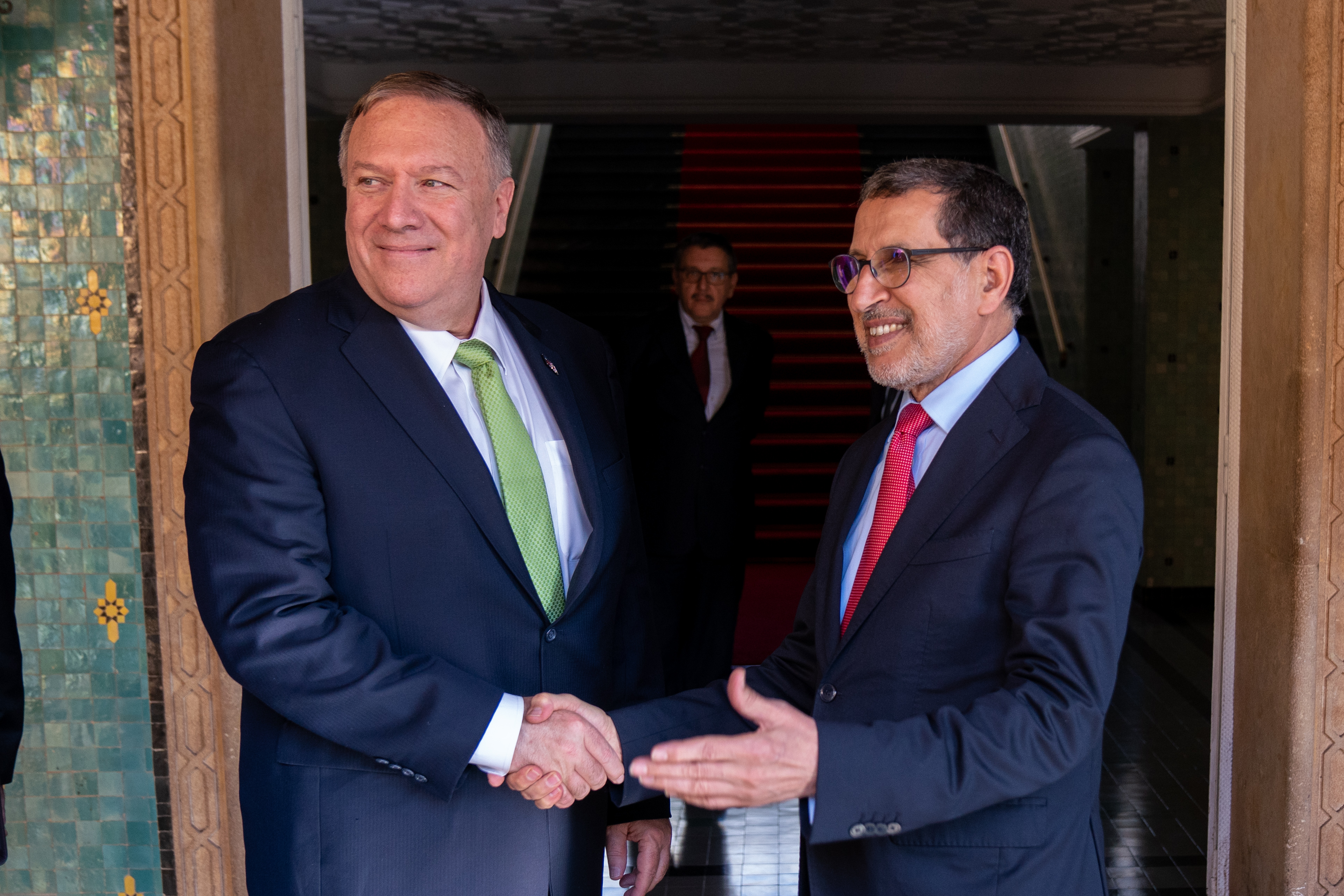
Secretary of State Mike Pompeo with Moroccan prime minister Saadeddine El Othmani, December 2019

On December 10, 2020, President Trump announced that the United States would officially recognize Morocco's claims over the disputed territory of Western Sahara, as a result of Morocco agreeing to normalize relations with Israel. Morocco had annexed most of the territory in 1975.

=== Qatar ===
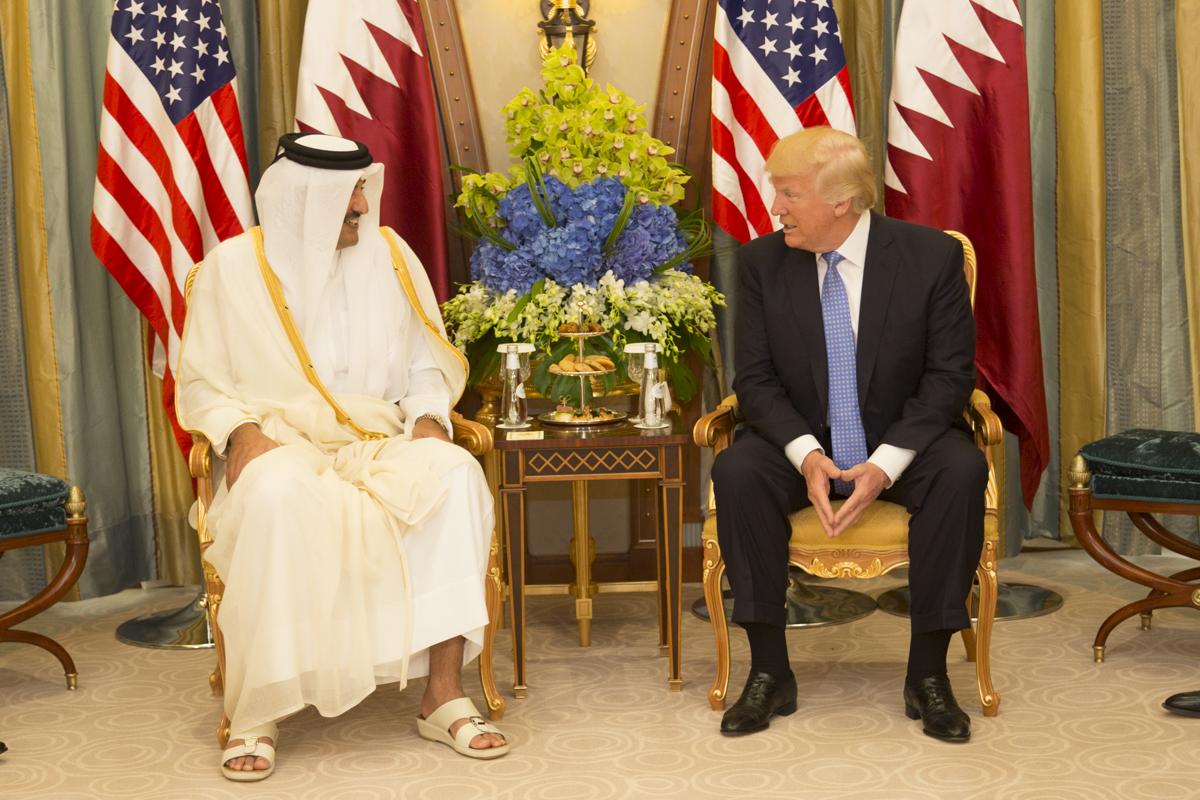
Trump and Emir Tamim bin Hamad Al Thani of Qatar, May 2017

The Trump administration aimed to support efforts in fighting against states and groups allied with Iran and the Muslim Brotherhood. However, Trump claimed credit for engineering the Qatar diplomatic crisis in a series of tweets.

Later on, Qatari Emir Tamim bin Hamad Al Thani visited the United States in 2019, when an expansion of Al Udeid Air Base was announced to be funded by Qatar, which would cost $1.8 billion (~$2.23 billion in 2025).

=== Saudi Arabia ===
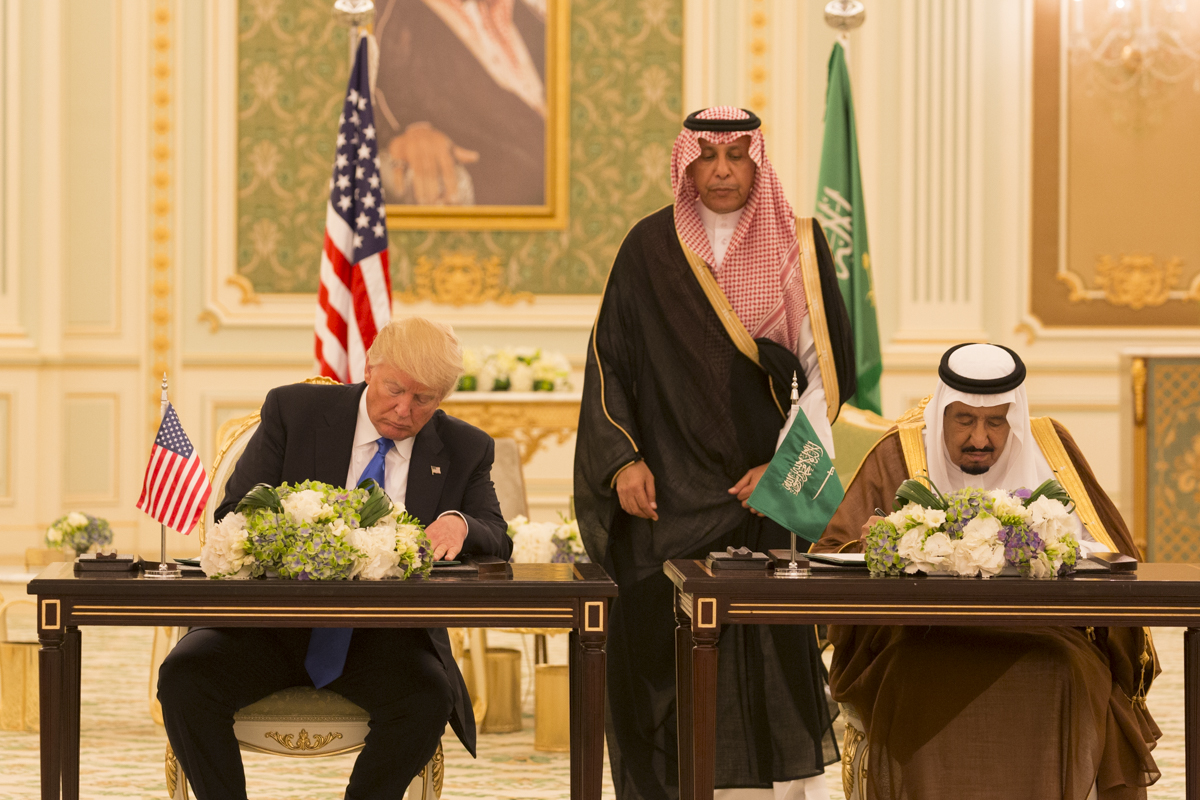
Trump and King Salman of Saudi Arabia sign a Joint Strategic Vision Statement for the United States and Saudi Arabia, May 20, 2017

During the 2016 campaign, Trump called for Saudi Arabia to pay for the costs of American troops stationed there. He argued that regional allies of the United States, such as Saudi Arabia should provide troops in the fight against the Islamic State of Iraq and the Levant (ISIL). Trump said he would halt oil imports from Saudi Arabia unless the Saudi government provided ground troops to defeat ISIL.

In March 2017, Secretary of State Rex Tillerson approved the resumption on the sale of guided munitions to Saudi Arabia, a move that had been halted late in the Obama administration because of criticisms of the Saudi government's approach to civilian casualties in the Yemeni Civil War.

=== Turkey ===
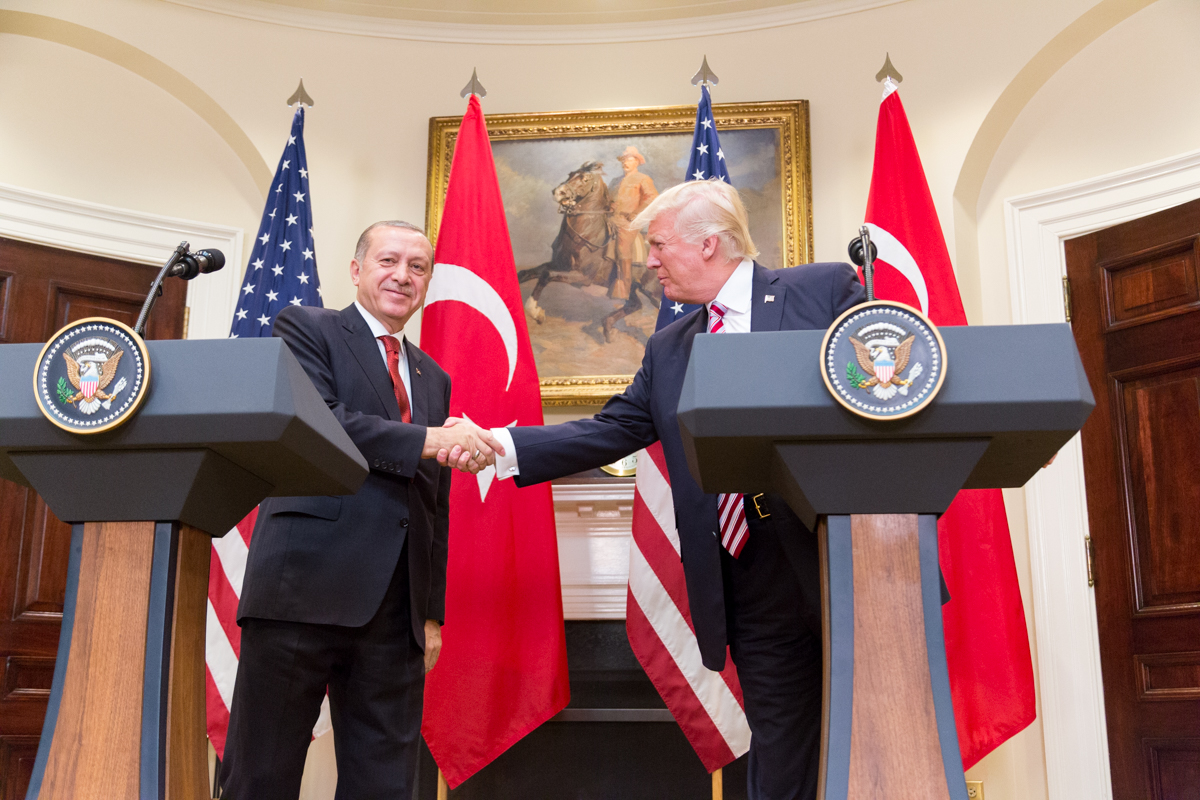
Trump and Turkish president Recep Tayyip Erdoğan, May 2017

During the 2016 campaign, Trump praised Turkish president Recep Tayyip Erdoğan for his handling of the 2016 coup attempt in Turkey. When asked if Erdoğan was exploiting the coup attempt to purge his political enemies, Trump did not call for the Turkish leader to observe the rule of law, or offer other cautions for restraint. He said that the United States had to "fix our own mess" before trying to change the behavior of other countries.

Trump also stated during the campaign that he believed he could persuade Erdoğan to step up efforts against ISIL. When asked how he would solve the problem of Turkish attacks on Kurds who are fighting ISIL, Trump said "Meetings."

Trump threatened Turkey with economic sanctions over its detention of the evangelical Christian pastor Andrew Brunson. On August 1, 2018, the Trump administration imposed sanctions on Turkey's justice and interior ministers.

In October 2019, Trump ordered the Pentagon to withdraw U.S. troops from Northern Syria to allow Turkey to extend the Turkish occupation of northern Syria, even though the Kurdish fighters the Turks attacked had helped the U.S. against the Islamic State. Pentagon officials stated that they were "completely blindsided" and "shocked" by the order.

=== Yemen ===
The Trump administration continued the United States drone strikes in Yemen against the Al-Qaeda affiliate in Yemen, that were previously begun and expanded in the previous administrations of George W. Bush and Barack Obama.

On February 1, 2020, Trump appeared to confirm reports that the U.S. had killed Qasim al-Raymi, the leader of an al Qaeda affiliate in Yemen by retweeting reports claiming that the CIA had conducted a drone strike targeting the Al-Qaeda in the Arabian Peninsula leader.

== Oceania ==
=== Australia ===
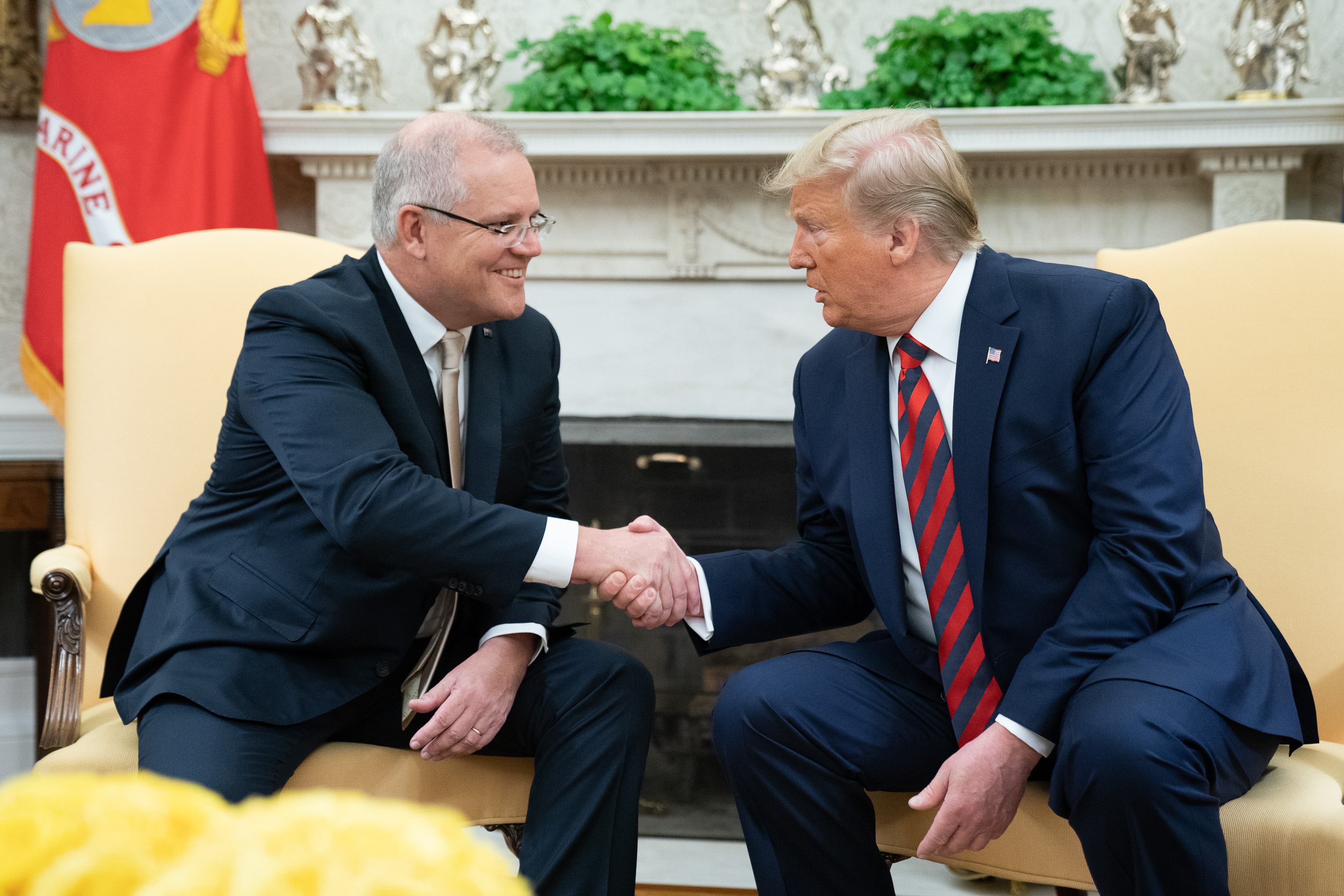
Trump and Australian prime minister Scott Morrison, September 2019

A report in The Washington Post on February 2, 2017, claimed that Trump berated Prime Minister Malcolm Turnbull and hung up 35 minutes earlier than planned over a refugee resettlement deal that President Obama had made with Australia where the United States agreed to take 1,250 refugees from camps in Nauru and Manus Island. It was also claimed that Trump suggested Turnbull was attempting to export the next Boston bombers to the United States. Later that same day, Trump explained that although he respected Australia, they were "terribly taking advantage" of the United States.

Australian Ambassador Joe Hockey met with Reince Priebus and Stephen Bannon the next day, and Sean Spicer described the call as "cordial". Reuters described the call as "acrimonious", and The Washington Post said that it was Trump's "worst call by far" with a foreign leader. Notwithstanding the disagreement regarding the resettlement of the refugees Vice President Mike Pence, while on a visit to Australia in April 2017, stated the United States will abide by the deal. The decision was seen as a positive sign of commitment by the Australian prime minister.

=== New Zealand ===
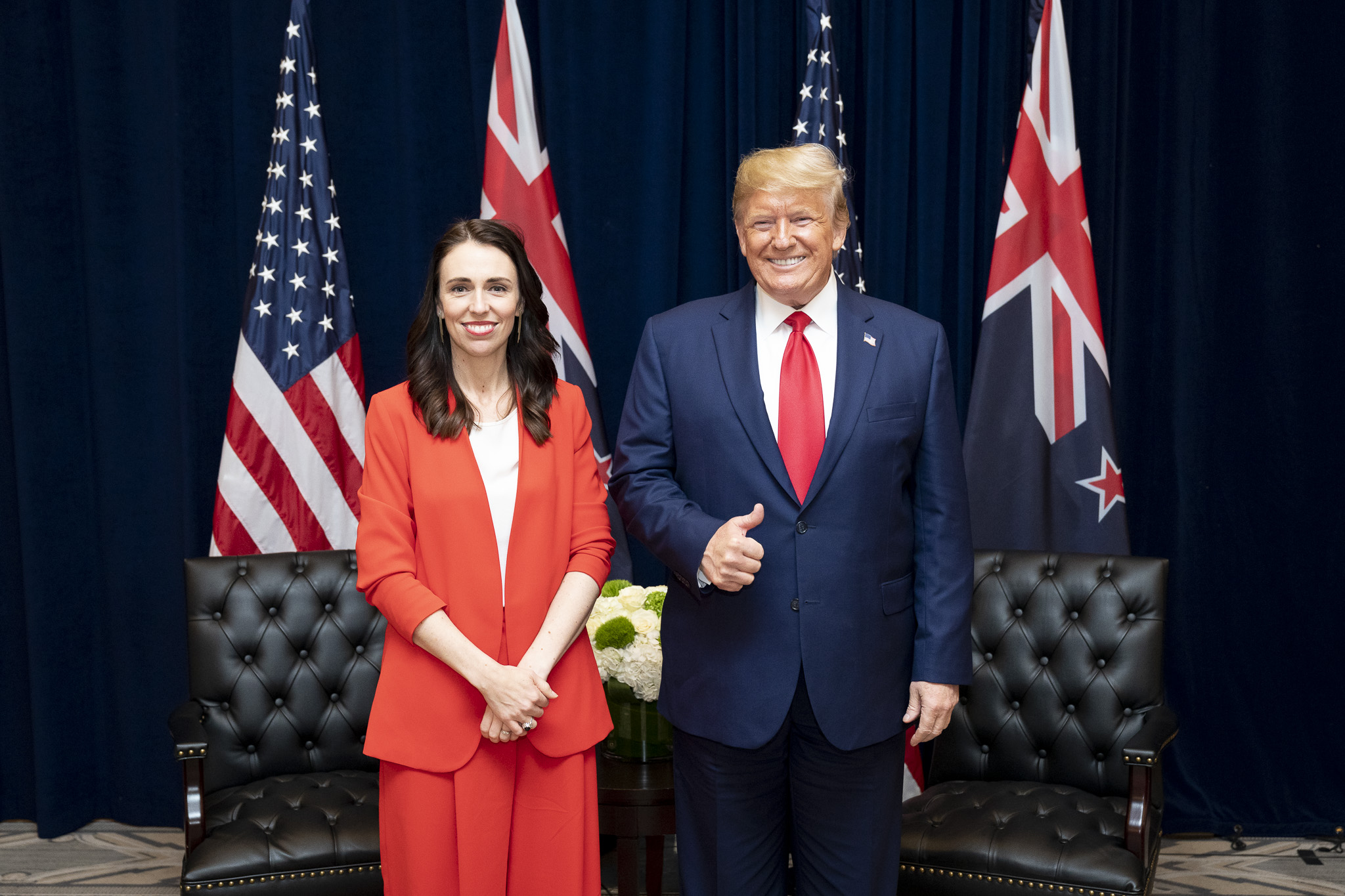
Trump and New Zealand prime minister Jacinda Ardern, September 2019

On 24 September 2019, Prime Minister Jacinda Ardern met with United States president Donald Trump on the sidelines of the annual United Nations General Assembly meeting. During the 25-minute meeting, the two leaders discussed various issues including tourism, the Christchurch mosque shooting, and bilateral trade. During the meeting, Trump expressed an interest in New Zealand's gun buy-back scheme.

== Sub-Saharan Africa ==
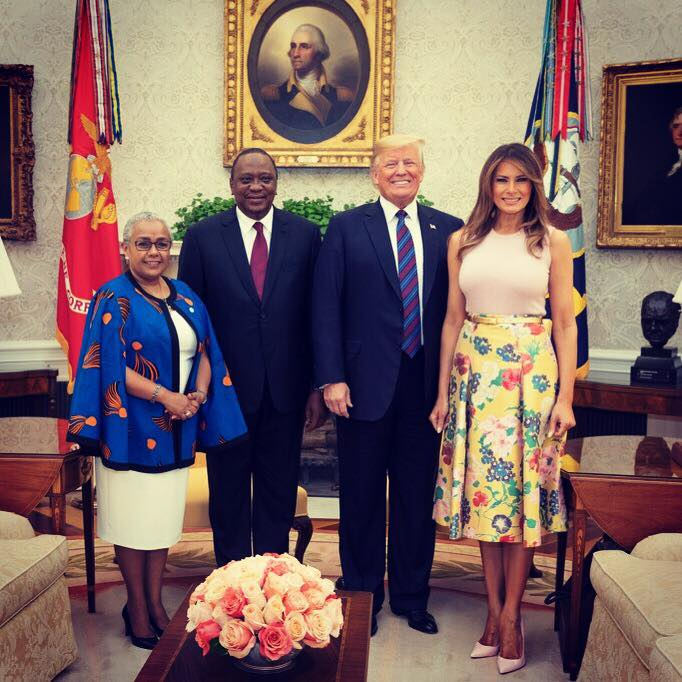
Trump welcoming Kenya's president Uhuru Kenyatta and his wife, August 2018

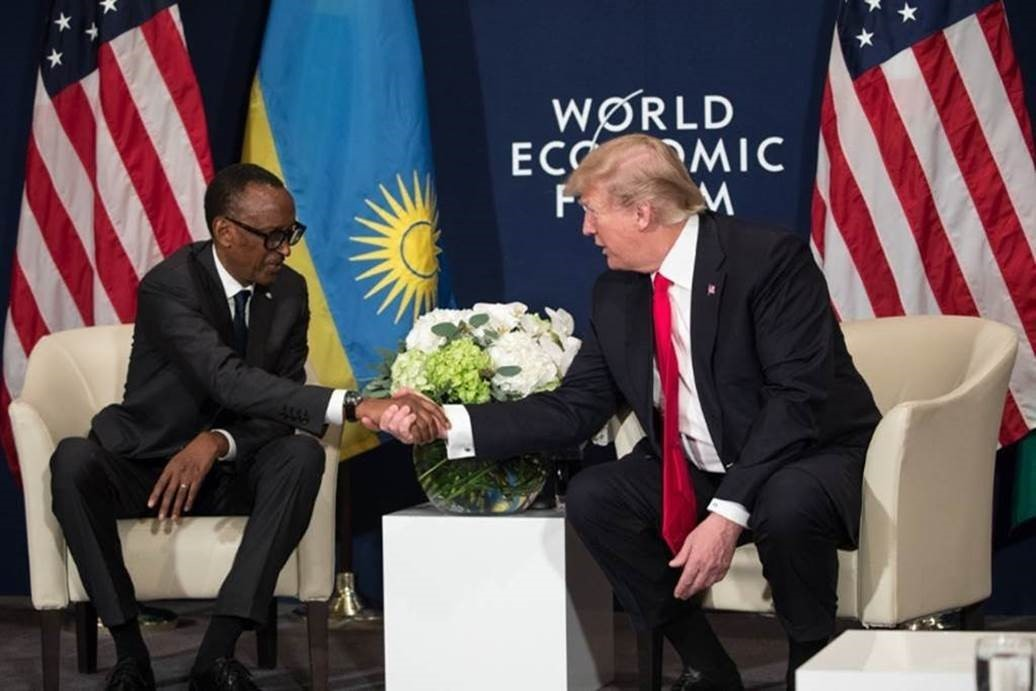
Trump shakes hands with Rwandan president Paul Kagame in 2018

The Trump administration was accused of generally "ignoring" Africa, particularly Sub-Saharan Africa. By October 2017, senior diplomatic positions relating to the continent were still vacant, including Assistant Secretary of State for African Affairs and Deputy Assistant Secretary of Defense for Africa. U.S. military operations in the region continued, but there were no clear statement of objectives or guidance for the United States Africa Command at the time, headed by General Thomas Waldhauser. Alan Patterson would later serve as Deputy Assistant Secretary of Defense for Africa from December 2017 to October 2018 and Tibor P. Nagy would become Assistant Secretary of State for African Affairs on July 23, 2018.

During a summer 2017 meeting about immigration, Trump reportedly said that Nigerians, once they came to the United States, would never "go back to their huts". The White House strongly denied the claim. In a meeting with congressional leaders on January 11, 2018, Trump asked during a discussion of immigration from Africa why America would want people from "all these shithole countries", suggesting that it would be better to receive immigrants from countries like Norway. The comment was condemned as racist by many foreign leaders and a UN spokesman. The African Union said it was "alarmed" by the comment, which "flies in the face of all accepted behavior and practice." African ambassadors in Washington planned to meet the following week to discuss a response. They expressed dismay that it took something like this to bring attention to Africa when the continent had so many other issues, such as famine and civil war, that Washington ignored.

=== Ethiopia ===
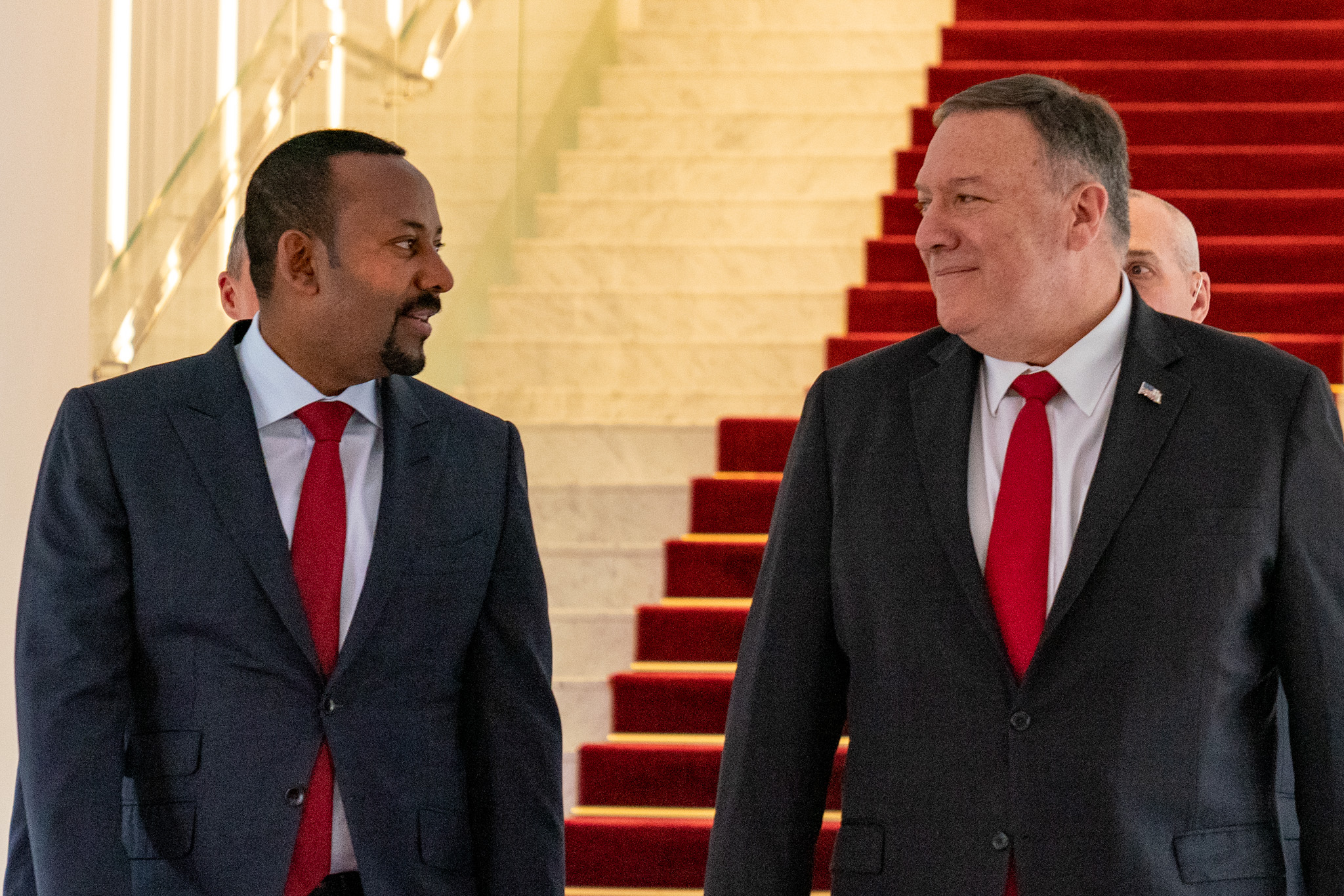
Secretary of State Mike Pompeo with Ethiopian prime minister Abiy Ahmed, February 2020

In September 2020, the United States suspended part of its economic assistance to Ethiopia due to the lack of sufficient progress in negotiations with Sudan and Egypt over the construction of the Grand Ethiopian Renaissance Dam. On October 24, 2020, President Donald Trump stated on a public phone call to Sudan's prime minister Abdalla Hamdok and Israel's prime minister Netanyahu that "it's a very dangerous situation because Egypt is not going to be able to live that way... And I said it and I say it loud and clear - they'll blow up that dam. And they have to do something." Ethiopian prime minister Abiy Ahmed responded that "Ethiopia will not cave in to aggression of any kind" and that threats were "misguided, unproductive and clear violations of international law."

=== South Africa ===
On August 23, 2018, Trump publicly instructed Secretary of State Mike Pompeo to investigate South African farm attacks, an instruction which was widely described in mainstream media as the administration advocating for an unfounded white genocide conspiracy theory. Trump had apparently gotten his information from a Tucker Carlson segment on Fox News. The media roundly berated the move, with New York magazine claiming Trump was attempting to "change the conversation — to one about "white genocide" in South Africa", Esquire reported that the "President of the United States is now openly promoting an international racist conspiracy theory as the official foreign policy of the United States". According to the SPLC, Trump had "tweeted out his intention to put the full force of the U.S. State Department behind a white nationalist conspiracy theory".

Causing "angry reaction in South Africa", many politicians responded critically including former US Ambassador to South Africa Patrick Gaspard, RSA deputy president David Mabuza and Julius Malema MP, who responded to Trump, declaring "there is no white genocide in South Africa", and that the US president's intervention into their ongoing land reform issues "only made them more determined... to expropriate our land without compensation". Trump had previously caused controversy around the topic as a presidential candidate in 2016, when he republished content from a social media account named "WhiteGenocideTM".

=== Sudan ===
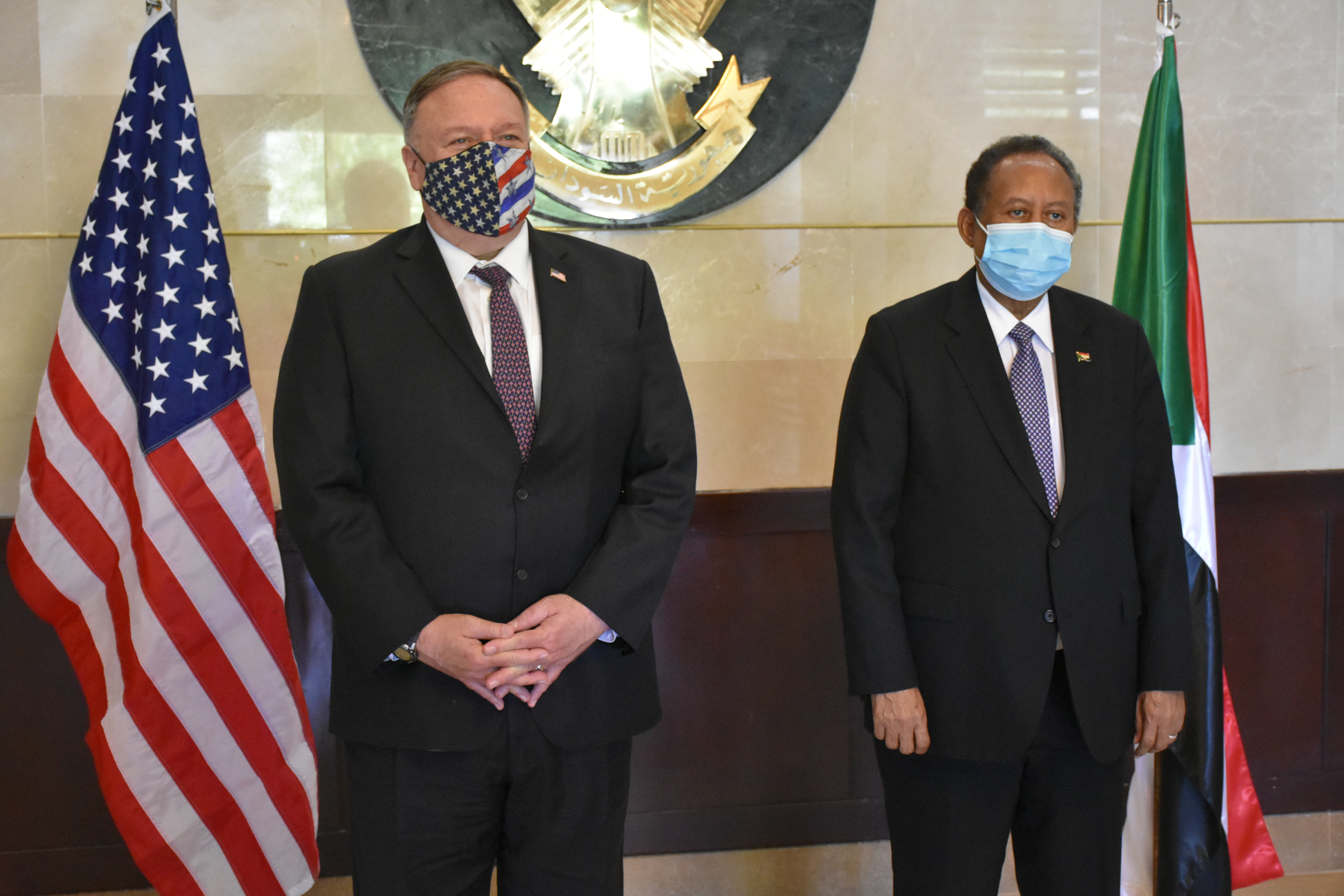
Secretary of State Mike Pompeo with Sudanese prime minister Abdalla Hamdok, August 2020

On October 23, 2020, the Israel–Sudan normalization agreement was finalized between Israel and the Sudan.

== International organizations and multilateral agreements ==
The Trump administration pursued unilateralist policies abroad in alignment with the "America First" policy.

=== European Union ===
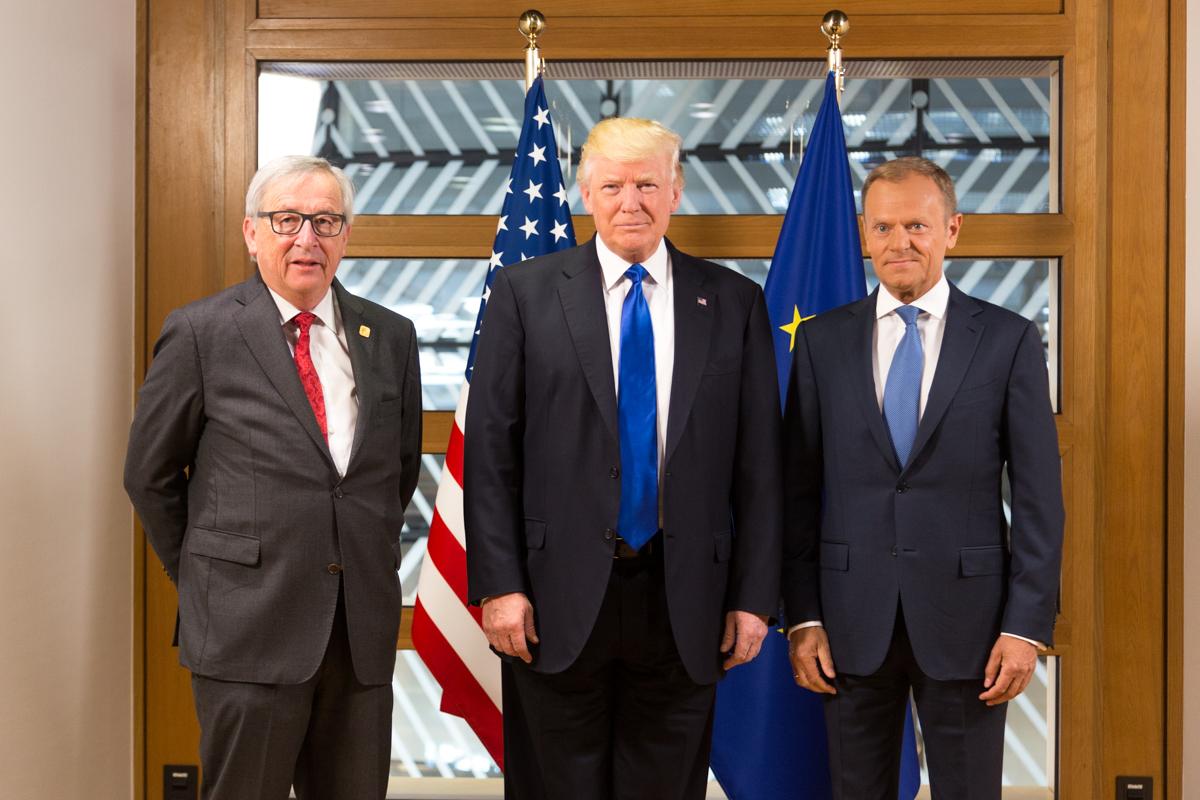
Trump with Jean-Claude Juncker (left) and Donald Tusk (right) in Brussels, before the start of their bilateral meeting, May 2017

Trump was more adversarial to the European Union than his predecessors, regarding the union more as an economic competitor than a partner in foreign affairs. During his 2016 election campaign, Trump said of the EU, "the reason that it got together was like a consortium so that it could compete with the United States." U.S. foreign policy experts such as Strobe Talbott and Amie Kreppel regarded this assertion as incorrect, emphasizing that though the EU was established in part to rebuild the European economies after World War II, it was not created specifically to compete with the United States and that, in fact, the U.S. government initially approved of the EU's creation.

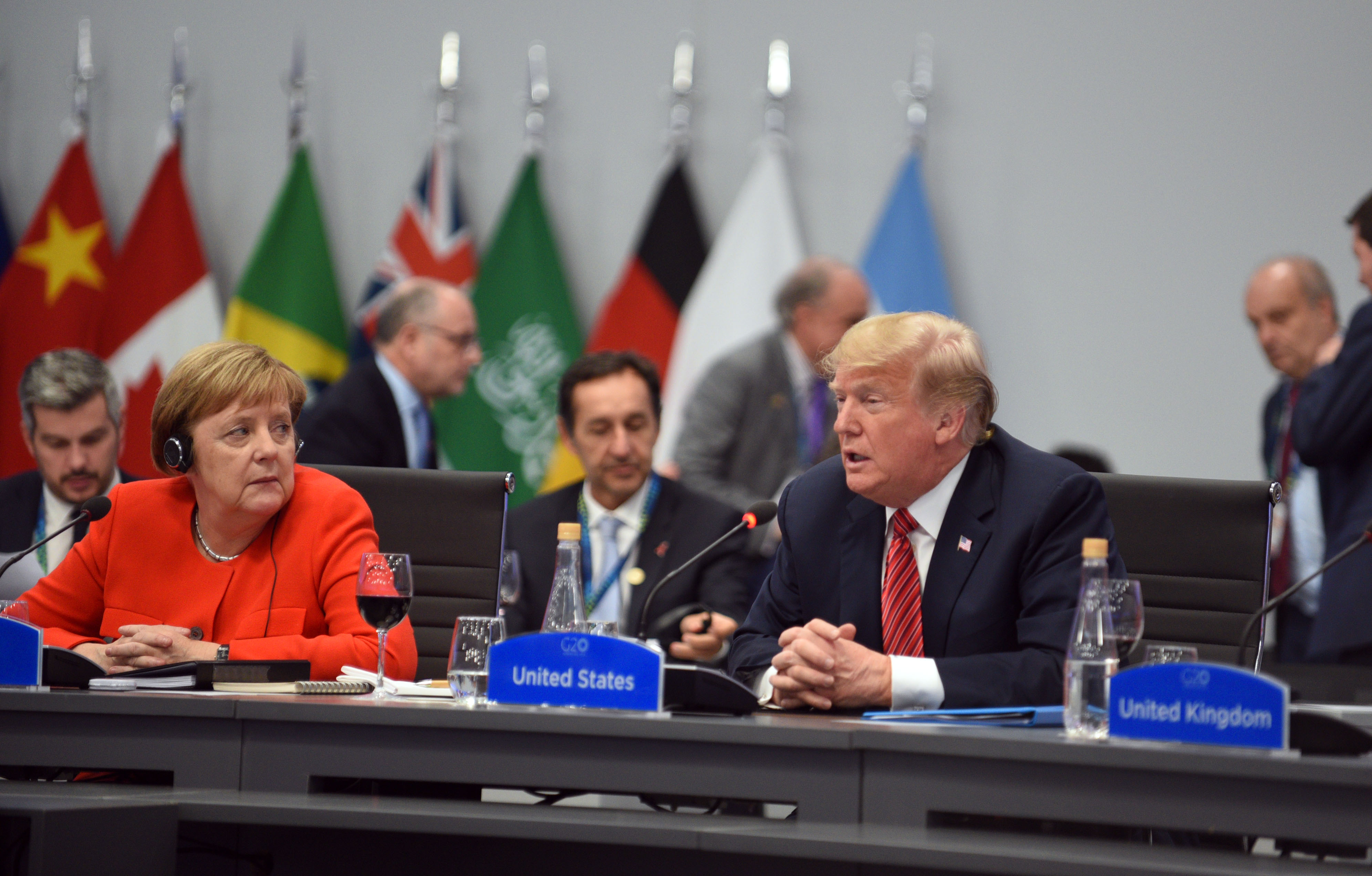
Angela Merkel criticized the draft of new sanctions against Russia that target EU–Russia energy projects.

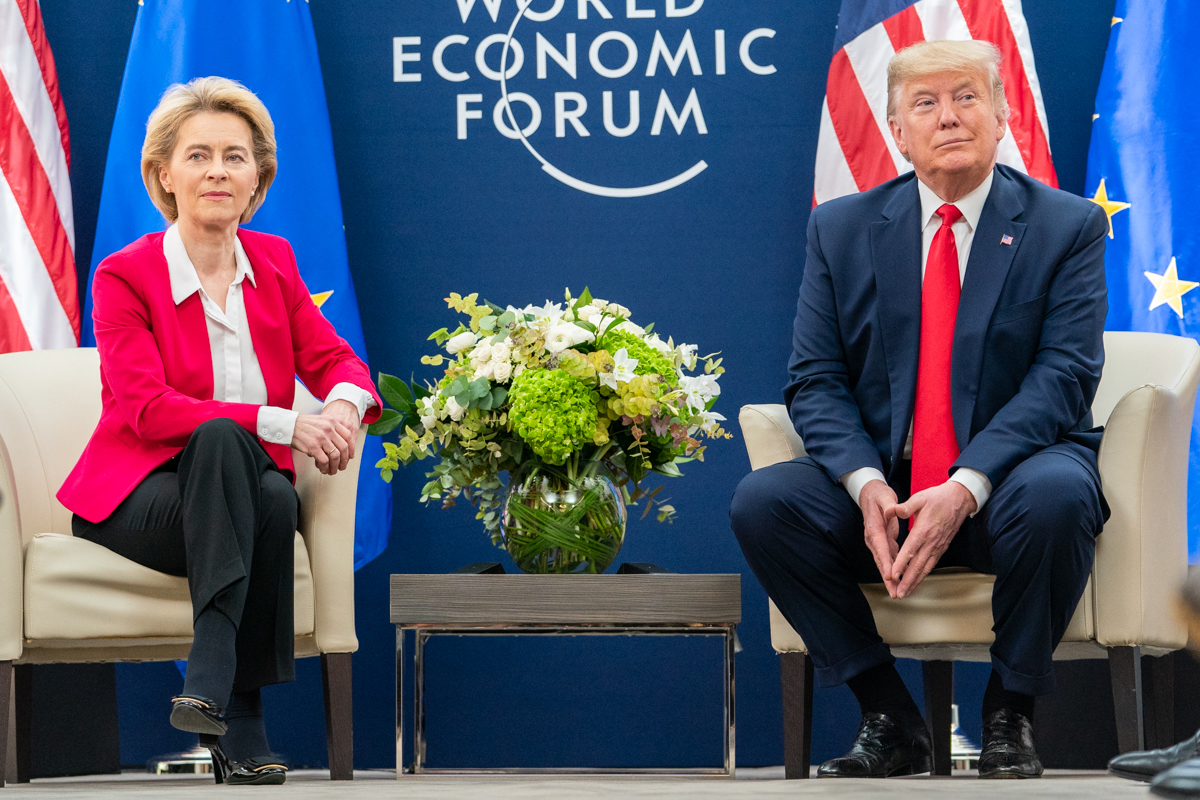
President of the European Commission Ursula von der Leyen meet with U.S. President Donald Trump with World Economic Forum, Davos, Switzerland, January 2020

In a 60-minute interview in mid-January 2017, with Michael Gove of the Times of London and Kai Diekmann of Bild, U.S. president Donald Trump criticized the European Union as "basically a vehicle for Germany" claiming that it was a "very catastrophic mistake" on Angela Merkel's part to admit a million refugees – whom he refers to as "illegals". In a letter to 27 European leaders, Donald Tusk, the president of the European Council, called these "worrying declarations" and claimed that the Trump administration seemed to "question the last 70 years of American foreign policy," placing the European Union in a "difficult situation". The relation soured even more when Jean-Claude Juncker jokingly said it would support the independence of the US State of Ohio and the city of Austin, Texas after Donald Trump backed the Brexit and encouraging other European countries to follow its example.

In May 2017, Angela Merkel met with Trump. Trump's nationalist sentiments had already strained relations with several EU countries and other American allies, to the point where after a NATO summit, Merkel said that Europeans cannot rely on United States' help anymore. This came after Trump had said the Germans were "bad, very bad" and threatened to stop all car trade with Germany.

In July 2018, Trump stated in an interview with CBS that the European Union is one of the United States' greatest foes globally, citing "what they do to us on trade". He followed this up with a tweet protesting the EU's fining of Google $5.1 billion for a violation of antitrust laws, commenting that the EU continues to take advantage of the US.

In December 2019, the United States urged the European countries to blacklist Hezbollah. Its ambassador to Germany Richard Grenell asked these countries to list Hezbollah as a terrorist organization, after a US civil contractor was killed in a rocket attack in Iraq's Kirkuk Province, which the US official said involved Kata'ib Hezbollah.

=== International Criminal Court ===
In September 2018, John Bolton threatened the International Criminal Court (ICC) over the organization planning to investigate alleged American war crimes in Afghanistan. In April 2019, an entry-visa of one member who part of the Afghanistan investigation was revoked. On September 2, 2020, the same individual was formally sanctioned according to Mike Pompeo.

=== NATO ===
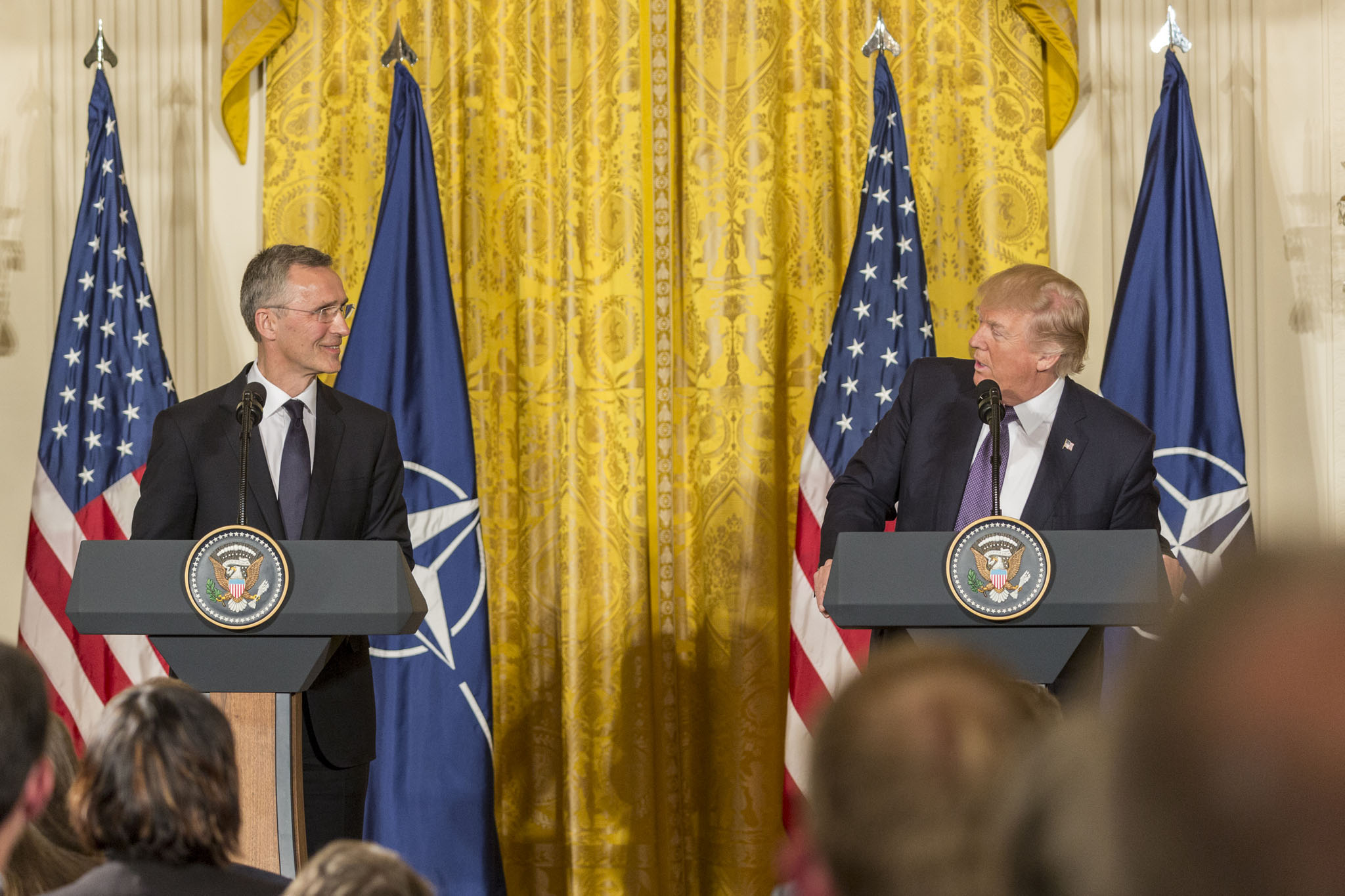
Trump and NATO Secretary General Jens Stoltenberg, April 2017

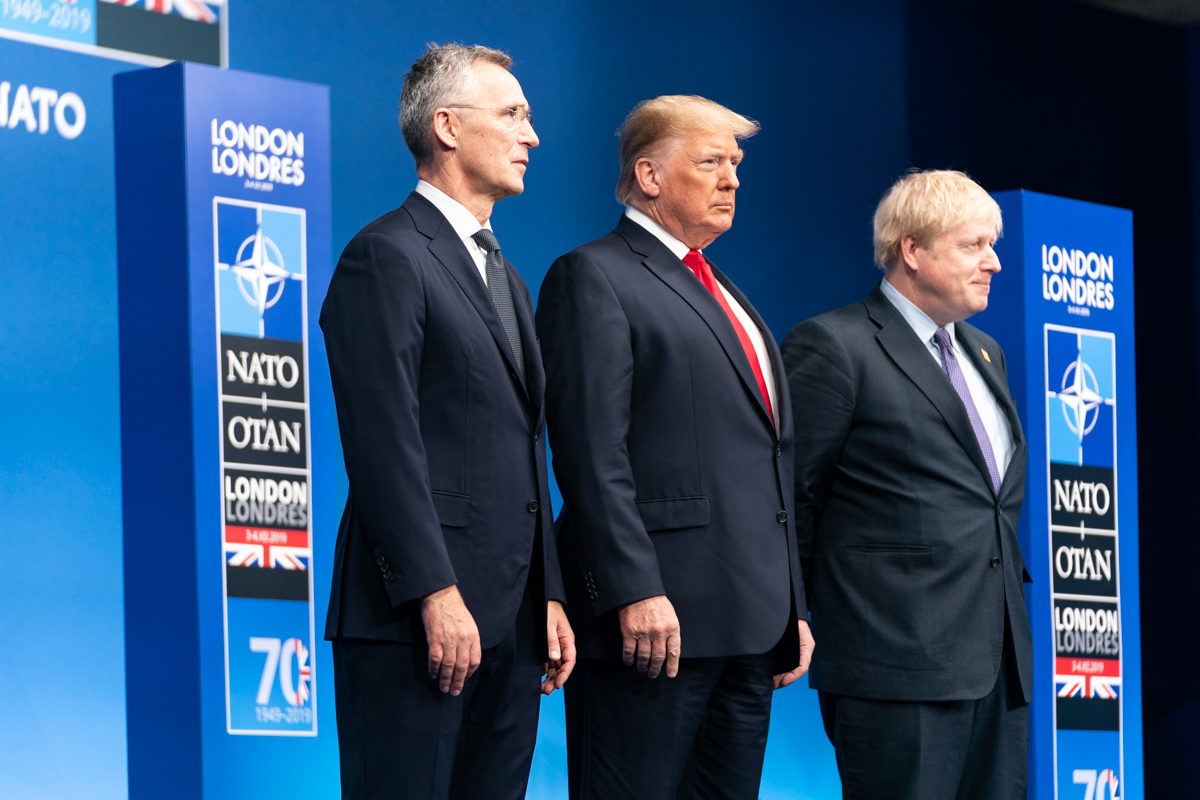
Trump with NATO Secretary General Jens Stoltenberg and British prime minister Boris Johnson, December 2019

During his presidential campaign in March 2016, Trump called for a "rethink" of American involvement in NATO, stating that the US pays too much to ensure the security of allies, that "NATO is costing us a fortune, and yes, we're protecting Europe with NATO, but we're spending a lot of money". Later in the same interview, he stated that the U.S. should not "decrease its role" in NATO but rather should decrease U.S. spending in regards to the organization. In a July 2016 interview, Trump "explicitly raised new questions about his commitment to automatically defend NATO allies," questioning whether he, as president, would automatically extend security guarantees to NATO members. Asked about a prospective Russia attack on NATO's Baltic members, Trump stated that he would decide whether to come to their aid only after reviewing whether those nations "have fulfilled their obligations to us." This represented a sharp break from traditional U.S. foreign policy regarding NATO.

As president, Trump said in a February 2017 speech that the US strongly supports NATO, but continued to insist that NATO members were not paying their fair share as part of the alliance. In March 2017, Trump called upon U.S. allies increase their financial commitment to their own defense or compensate the United States for providing it, asserting that Germany and NATO owed "vast sums of money" to the U.S. for defense. In May 2017, on a visit to the new NATO headquarters, Trump called upon NATO to do more to fight terrorism and to add limiting immigration to its tasks. In the speech he did not explicitly reaffirm U.S. commitment to Article V, which obligates all NATO members to respond to an attack against any one member. White House spokesperson Sean Spicer later reaffirmed America's commitment to joint defense.

Referencing countries that had not spent the minimum of 2% of their national GDP for defense by 2024, a NATO guideline, Trump claimed that "many of these nations owe massive amounts of money from past years." While most members of the alliance indeed had yet to reach the 2% target, the countries are not in arrears and they "do not owe anything" to the United States or to NATO. In April 2019, Secretary-General Jens Stoltenberg played down the disputes with Trump, noting in an address to Congress that "there are differences" (noting disputes over trade, energy, climate change policy, the Iran nuclear agreement and burden sharing among NATO allies). Noting that NATO members are on track to increase defense spending by up to $100 billion, Stoltenberg said that "this has been the clear message from President Trump and this message is having a real impact."

Critics of Trump charged him with failing to understand or honor the strategic significance of NATO and collective defense to the U.S.'s national security, and of seeing the NATO alliance in transactional terms, with one describing Trump's views on collective defense as more akin to a "protection racket". According to John Bolton, Trump had to be talked out of leaving NATO several times and would withdraw the United States from NATO if he had the chance of a second term.

=== United Nations ===
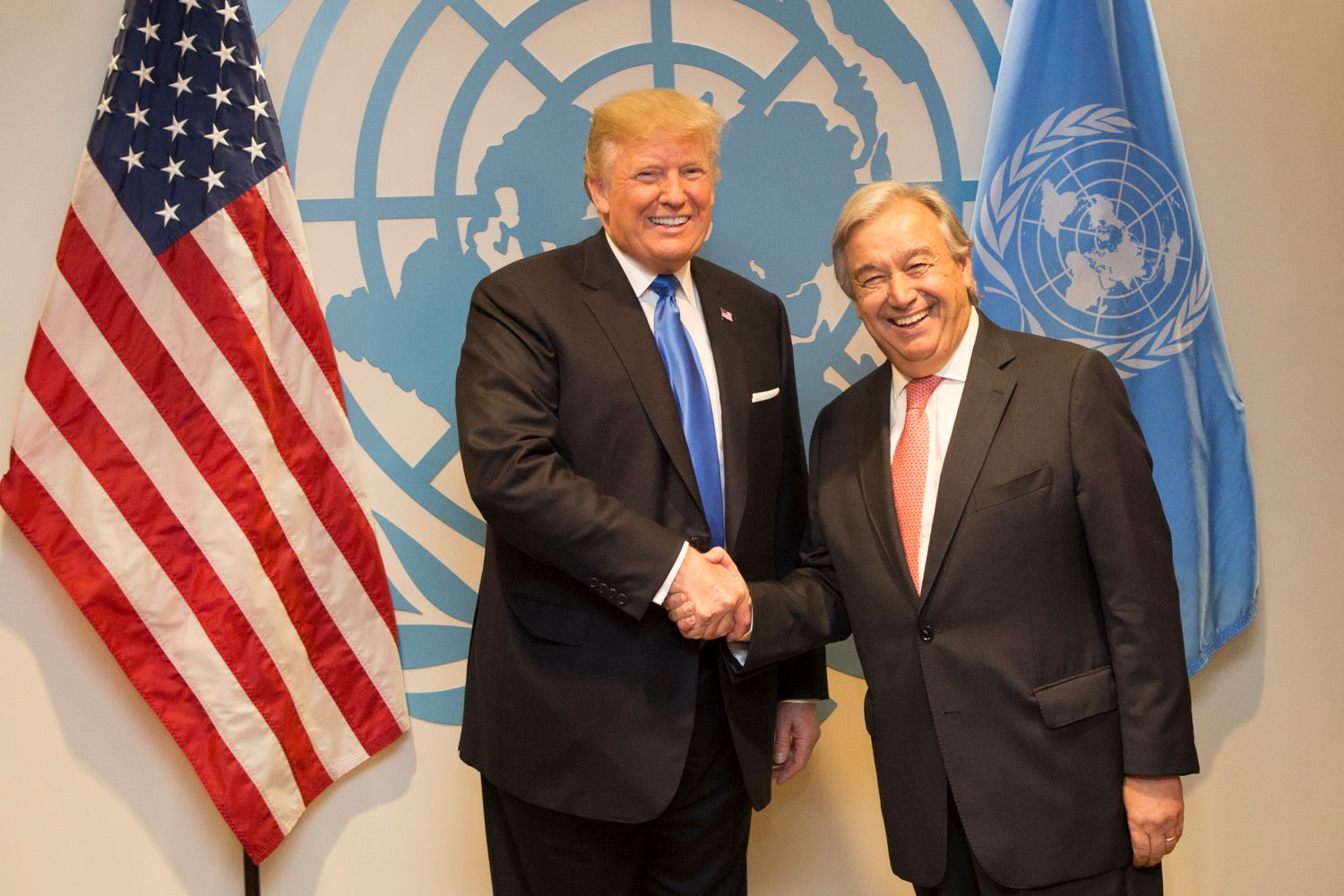
Trump and UN Secretary-General António Guterres

During the 2016 campaign, Trump criticized the United Nations, saying that it was weak, incompetent, and "not a friend of democracy... freedom... the United States... Israel". Upon taking office, Trump appointed Nikki Haley as the United States Ambassador to the United Nations. On September 25, 2018, Trump addressed the General Assembly of the United Nations in New York City. After boasting that his administration had accomplished more in two years than almost any other U.S. administration in history, his speech was interrupted by laughter from the assembly. Trump claimed that the diplomats were laughing with him, rather than at him.

=== Paris climate agreement ===
President Trump announces the United States withdrawal from the Paris Agreement, June 1, 2017

In June 2017, Trump announced that the U.S. would withdraw from the Paris Agreement to combat climate change. The withdrawal left the U.S. as one of the world's only countries outside the Paris Agreement (which consolidated each country's voluntary pledge to reduce carbon emissions and aimed to further emissions cuts), and made the U.S. the sole country to withdraw from the agreement after entering into it. Trump's withdrawal formally abandoned President Obama's goal of cutting U.S. emissions by 28% below 2005 levels by 2025. The U.S. withdrawal formally came into effect on November 4, 2020. Trump's decision to withdrawal from the agreement dismayed business leaders and U.S. allies and was condemned by scientists, which warned that U.S. withdrawal would deepen the climate crisis.

=== Geneva Consensus Declaration ===
In 2020, the United States joined 34 other countries from Asia, Africa, and South America to "reaffirm that there is no international right to abortion, nor any international obligation on the part of states to finance or facilitate abortion," in the Geneva Consensus Declaration on Promoting Women's Health and Strengthening the Family.

== Trade policy ==
When announcing his candidacy in June 2015, Trump said that his experience as a negotiator in private business would enhance his ability to negotiate better international trade deals as president. Trump identifies himself as a "free trader", but was widely described as a "protectionist". Trump described supporters of international trade as "blood suckers".

Trump's views on trade upended traditional Republican party policies favoring free trade. Binyamin Appelbaum, reporting for the New York Times, summarized Trump's proposals as breaking with 200 years of economics orthodoxy. American economic writer Bruce Bartlett argued that Trump's protectionist views have roots in the Whig Party program of the 1830s. He noted that many Americans were sympathetic to these views, while saying this was nonetheless not a good justification to adopt them. Canadian writer Lawrence Solomon describes Trump's position on trade as similar to that as of pre-Reagan Republican presidents, such as Herbert Hoover (who signed the Smoot-Hawley Tariff Act) and Richard Nixon (who ran on a protectionist platform).

A January 2019 intelligence community assessment concluded that Trump's trade policies and unilateralism had "damaged" traditional alliances and induced foreign partners to seek new relationships.

=== NAFTA, Mexico trade dispute, and USMCA ===
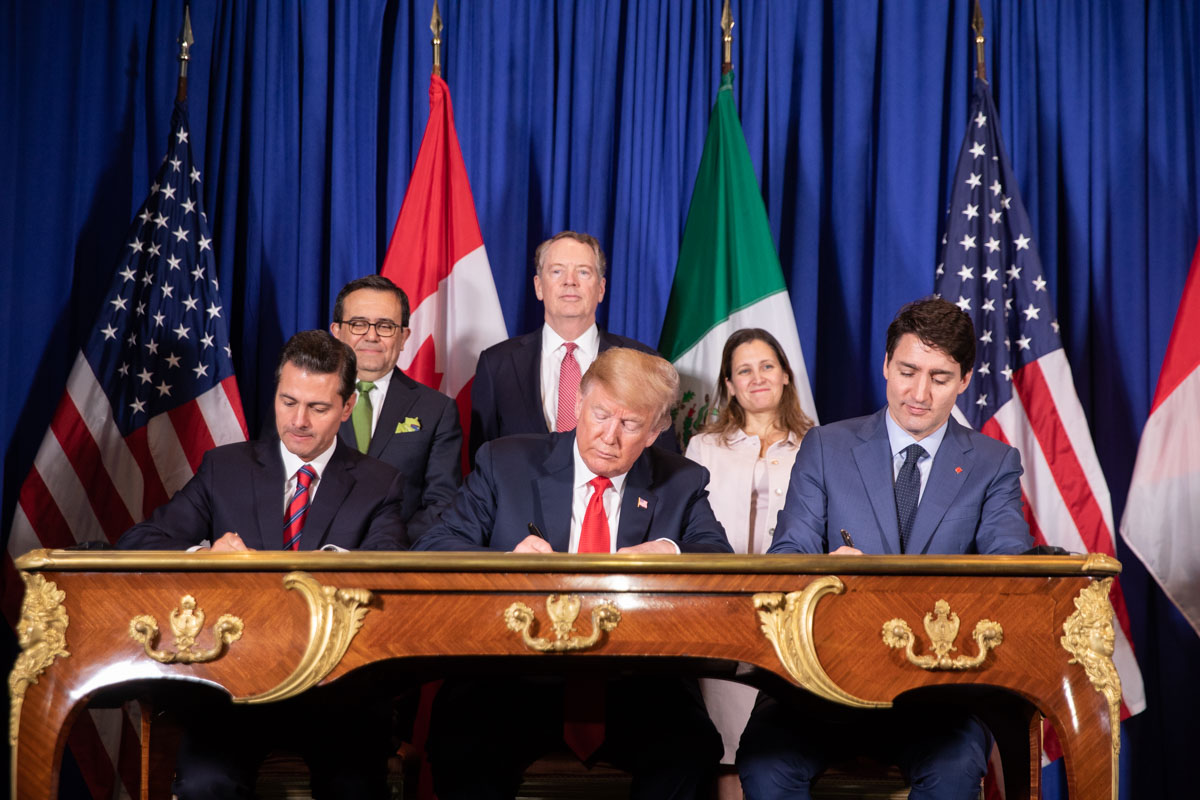
Trump signs the USMCA, alongside Mexican president Enrique Peña Nieto and Canadian prime minister Justin Trudeau during the G20 summit in Buenos Aires, Argentina, November 30, 2018.

During the 2016 campaign, Trump condemned the North American Free Trade Agreement (NAFTA), saying that if elected president, "We will either renegotiate it, or we will break it."

During his meeting with Canadian prime minister Justin Trudeau after becoming president, Trump stated that he viewed the Canadian situation different than Mexico, and only envisioned minor changes for Canada, with much larger ones for Mexico.

During the 2016 campaign, Trump vowed to impose tariffs — in the range of 15 to 35 percent — on companies that move their operations to Mexico. He specifically criticized the Ford Motor Co., Carrier Corporation, and Mondelez International. The dispute was partially resolved by the USMCA, which requires Mexican auto manufacturers to pay their workers a minimum wage of $16/hr.

After taking office, White House press secretary Sean Spicer noted that Trump was considering imposing a 20 percent tariff on Mexican imports to the United States as one of several options that would pay for his proposed border wall. The Mexican government stated that if unilateral tariffs were imposed on Mexico, it would consider retaliating by imposing tariffs on goods Mexico imports from the United States.

In September 2018, the United States, Mexico, and Canada reached an agreement to replace NAFTA with the United States–Mexico–Canada Agreement (USMCA). NAFTA remained in force until the ratification of the USMCA in July 2020.

=== Trade with China ===
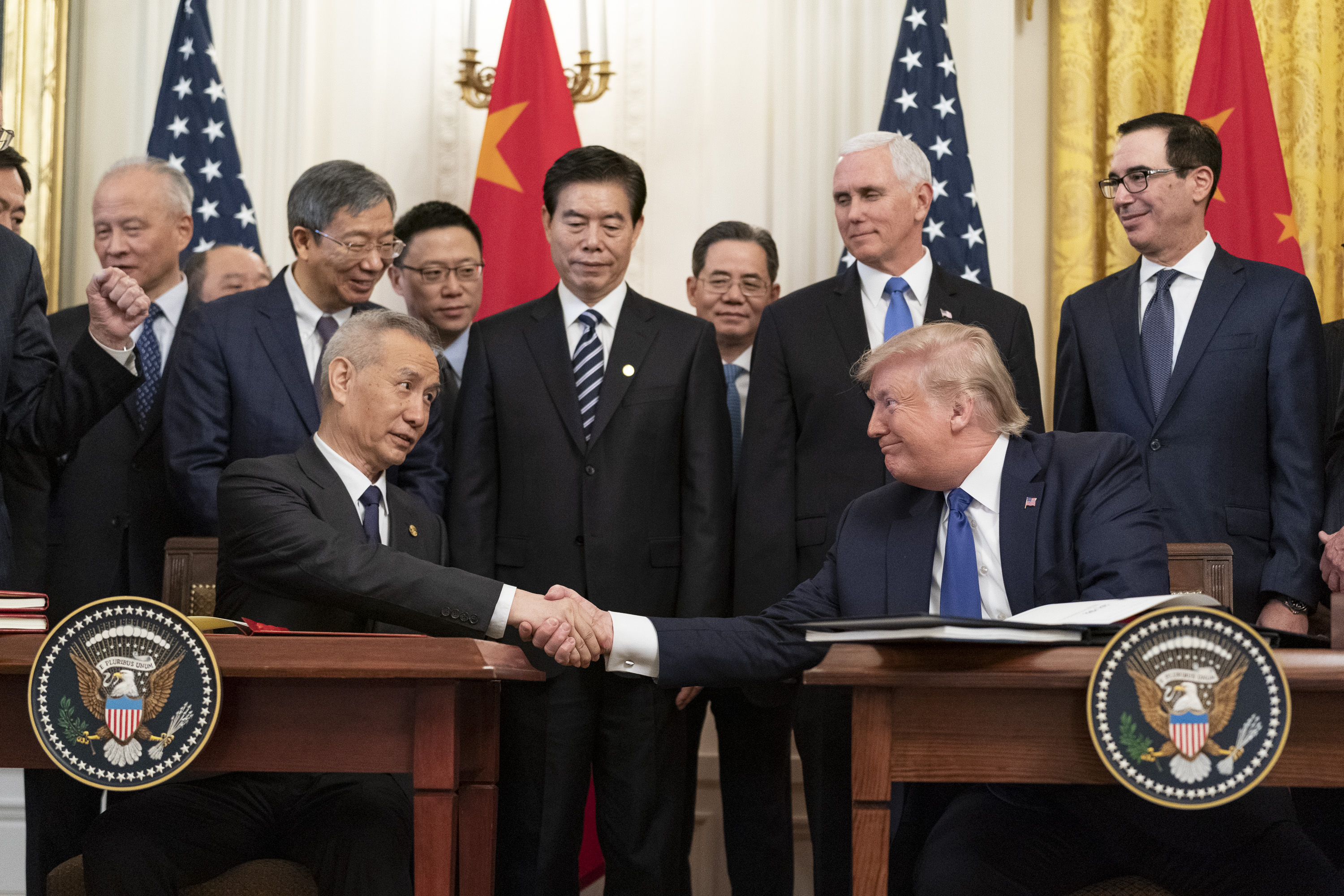
Trump and Chinese Vice Premier Liu He sign the Phase One Trade Deal, January 15, 2020.

During the 2016 campaign, Trump proposed a 45 percent tariff on Chinese exports to the United States to give "American workers a level playing field." According to an analysis by Capital Economics, Trump's proposed tariff may hurt U.S. consumers by driving U.S. retail price of Chinese made goods up 10 percent, because of few alternative suppliers in key product classes China sells to the U.S. The goods trade deficit with China in 2015 was $367.2 billion (~$487 billion in 2025). The Economic Policy Institute (EPI) reported in December 2014 that "Growth in the U.S. goods trade deficit with China between 2001 and 2013 eliminated or displaced 3.2 million U.S. jobs, 2.4 million (three-fourths) of which were in manufacturing." EPI reported these losses were distributed across all 50 states.

Trump pledged "swift, robust and unequivocal" action against Chinese piracy, counterfeit American goods, and theft of U.S. trade secrets and intellectual property, and condemned China's "illegal export subsidies and lax labor and environmental standards." In a May 2016 campaign speech, Trump responded to concerns regarding a potential trade war with "We're losing $500 billion in trade with China. Who the hell cares if there's a trade war?"

=== Trans-Pacific Partnership ===
During the 2016 campaign, Trump opposed the Trans-Pacific Partnership that the Obama administration had negotiated, calling it "insanity. That deal should not be supported and it should not be allowed to happen." He said the US was "giving away" concessions to China. Days after taking office, on January 23, 2017, Trump withdrew from the proposed deal, citing the need to protect American workers from competition by workers in low-wage countries. The international trade agreement never took effect.

=== World Trade Organization ===
During the 2016 campaign, Trump called the World Trade Organization (WTO) a "disaster". He said that if U.S. companies moved their manufacturing operations abroad, he would place tariffs of 15 to 35 percent on these products when they were sold to U.S. consumers. When informed that this would be contrary to the rules of the WTO, he answered "even better. Then we're going to renegotiate or we're going to pull out [of the WTO]."

The United States remained an active WTO member throughout 2020.

== Global health security ==
President Trump announces a 30-day ban on travel from all European countries with the expection of the United Kingdom, March 11, 2020

=== COVID-19 travel bans ===
In late January 2020, the Trump administration banned travel to the U.S. by mainland Chinese nationals, allowing US citizens abroad and legal US residents to return.

On March 11, President Trump announced a travel ban on foreigners coming from the Schengen Area, and later added Ireland and the United Kingdom to the list. Unlike the bans on entry by mainland Chinese and Iranian nationals, these were rescinded by Trump and due to expire January 26, 2021.

== Military ==
=== Funding, readiness, and oversight ===
In his first term, Trump frequently said that he inherited a "depleted" military from his predecessor, Barack Obama, despite evidence to the contrary in regards to funding, readiness, and infrastructure. Retired Army general David Petraeus and military analysts Michael E. O'Hanlon and Lawrence Korb also denied Trump's claims of a U.S. military readiness crisis, regarding them as inaccurate. Under the four fiscal years of the Trump administration, U.S. military funding totaled about $2.5 trillion, about $100 billion in additional funds annually. However spending was lower than during Obama's first term (2009–2013) when using data adjusted for inflation.

In the early years of his presidency, Trump sought to shift authority over military operations back to the Pentagon by loosening rules of engagement and reducing White House oversight in the chain of command, a departure from his predecessor. Although the streamlined decision-making was welcomed by many in the military as reducing political micromanaging and increasing military responsiveness and command flexibility, it also drew repeated criticism for sharply increasing civilian casualties abroad. In 2020, Mother Jones reported that, under Trump, "the US military was pursuing a strategy that tolerated a higher risk of bloodshed..." in Afghanistan and that from 2016 to 2019, the number of Afghan civilians killed by international airstrikes increased by 330 percent. After 2017, civilian casualties caused by U.S. forces in Yemen escalated in "...the most intensive period of strikes in that country by any U.S. president since 2001," according to Airwars.

In April 2017, after approving the use of the MOAB on the battlefield for the first time, Trump commented "What I do is I authorize my military ... We have given them total authorization and that's what they're doing and, frankly, that's why they've been so successful lately." It was reported in 2018 that when the CIA showed Trump an example of a drone strike not launching its payload until the suspect had left a home with its family inside, he said "Why did you wait?"

Trump often boasted of the U.S. military's weapons arsenal to the point of exaggeration, with weapons experts noting Trump's comments in regards to the W76-2 thermonuclear warhead and F-35 fighter jet in particular as "extravagant" and "sometimes straying beyond reality..."

=== Overseas presence ===
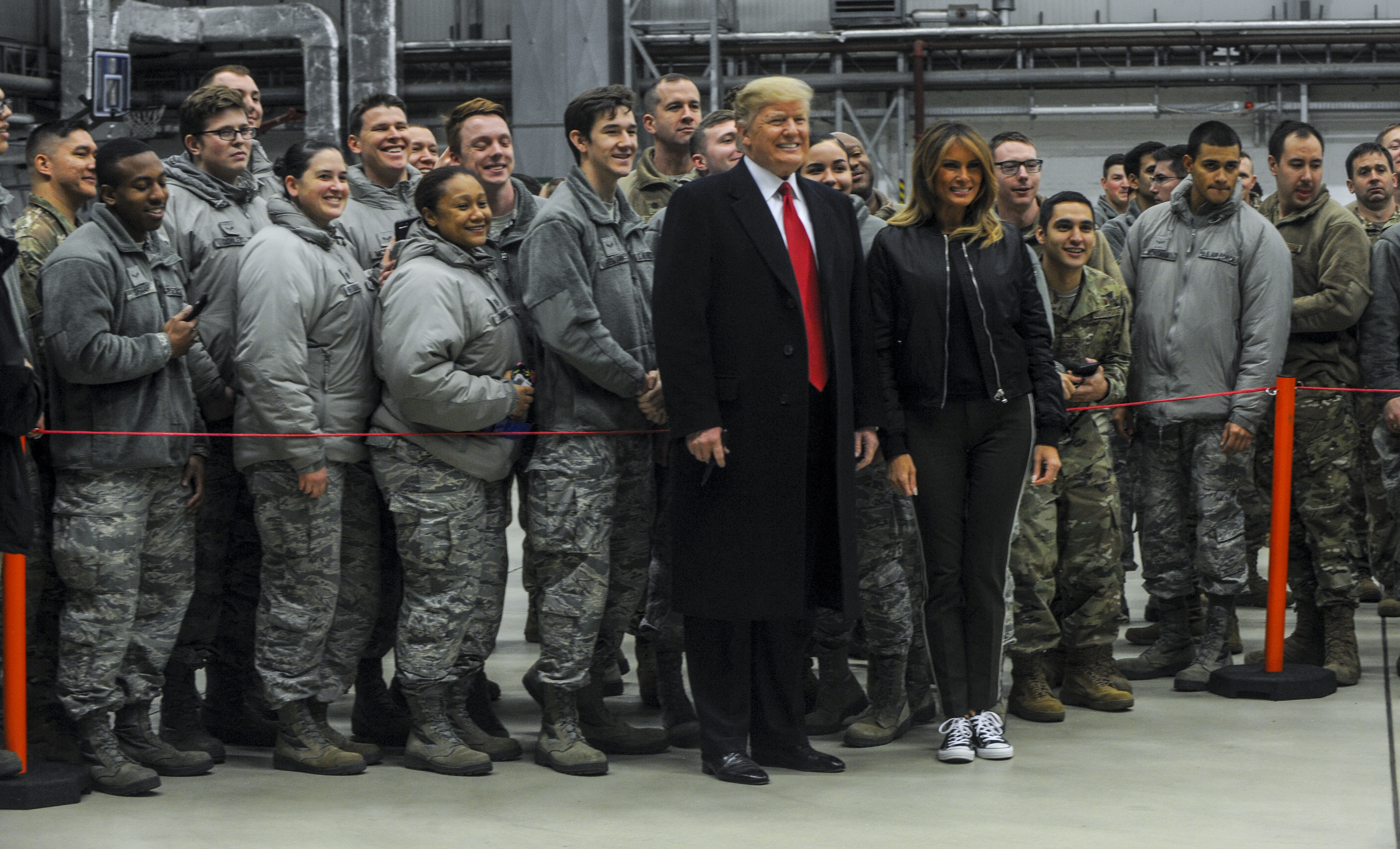
President Trump and First Lady Melania pose for photos with U.S. Airmen at Ramstein Air Base, Germany, December 2018

Under the Trump administration, there was a modest decrease in U.S. troop levels in Afghanistan, Iraq, and Syria after an initial increase. By October 2020, there were 4,500 U.S. ground troops in Afghanistan, 3,000 in Iraq, and 750 in Syria, amounting to almost 10,000 combined. Trump's efforts to withdraw additional troops from Afghanistan and Germany were blocked by the National Defense Authorization Act for Fiscal Year 2021, which limited his authority to withdraw forces from those countries. Trump vetoed this bill, but the veto was overridden.

Trump touted his legacy of being the first president in decades to not start any "new wars", only using legislation passed by previous administrations to conduct ongoing foreign interventions and wars he inherited. The Trump administration increased drone strokes in Somalia and bolstered troop presence in Saudi Arabia and the Persian Gulf region, particularly during the Persian Gulf crisis against Iran.

In February 2020, the Trump administration signed the Doha Agreement, a peace agreement with the Taliban to conclude the war in Afghanistan and begin a full troop withdrawal.

In December 2020, the Trump administration ordered AFRICOM to withdraw 700 U.S. troops from Somalia, dispersing them to other East African countries such as Kenya and Djibouti; U.S. drone strikes and cooperation with Somali forces were expected to continue.

=== Relations with military leadership ===
Trump ruptured traditional U.S. norms of civil-military relations and strained presidential relations with military leadership. He initially expressed admiration and praise for his generals but began deriding them in both public and private in the later years of his first presidency. In 2020, Reuters observed that Trump grew increasingly irritated when the advice of his generals "ran against his wishes," and that he was "frustrated by the wars he inherited and uncomfortable with an apolitical military leadership he sometimes sees as disloyal." In 2020, Trump publicly derided U.S. military commanders, accusing them of pushing for war to benefit military contractors.

The Atlantic reported in 2020 that while on a visit to France, Trump had disparaged U.S. military personnel, including fallen soldiers, in crude and demeaning language; CNN and Fox News corroborated much of the reporting while Trump denied making the comments. The controversy only further strained his relations with the military late in his term.

== Surveillance ==
=== Withdrawal from the Open Skies Treaty ===
In May 2020, Trump said he intended to withdraw the US from "Open Skies", a 2002 treaty between three dozen countries that aims to promote military transparency. Under the treaty, participants are allowed to perform reconnaissance flights to gather information about each other's military activities. The European Union said it hoped the US would not withdraw. In explaining his position, Trump alleged that Russia had violated the terms of the treaty; Russia denied doing so.

On November 22, 2020, Secretary of State Mike Pompeo and National Security Council stated via Twitter that the 6-month period is over and the US is no longer party to the Treaty.

== Nuclear policy ==
During the 2016 campaign, Trump said that the U.S.'s control is getting weaker and that its nuclear arsenal is old and does not work.

When asked at March 2016 campaign town hall with MSNBC's Chris Matthews whether he would rule out the use of nuclear weapons, Trump answered that the option of using nuclear weapons should never be taken off the table.

=== Nuclear proliferation ===
During the 2016 campaign, Trump expressed support for South Korea, Japan and Saudi Arabia having nuclear weapons if they would be unwilling to pay the United States for security. He also deemed it inevitable, "It's going to happen anyway. It's only a question of time. They're going to start having them or we have to get rid of them entirely." Trump's tentative support for nuclear proliferation was in contradiction to decades of bipartisan U.S. consensus on the issue.

=== Pakistani nuclear arsenal ===
During the 2016 campaign, Trump was critical of Pakistan, comparing it to North Korea, calling it "probably the most dangerous country" in the world, and claiming that Pakistan's nuclear weapons posed a "serious problem". He advocated improving relations with India as a "check" to Pakistan. He said that his government would fully cooperate with India in doing so.

However, bilateral relations apparently improved after Imran Khan came to power. Speaking of Imran Khan in a bilateral summit, Trump said, "I've heard they've made great progress. And under this leader — he's a great leader — I think he wants to make great progress because there's no solution the other way. The other way is only going to lead to death and chaos and poverty. It's all it's going to lead to. I mean, he understands it. Your Prime Minister understands it."

== Foreign anti LGBT laws ==
In February 2019, it was announced that Richard Grenell was leading the Trump administration's newly formed effort to promote the decriminalization of homosexuality in nations in which homosexuality was illegal.

In April 2020, Grenell said the administration was considering policies to reduce intelligence-sharing with countries that criminalize homosexuality.

== See also ==
- Second Cold War
- List of international presidential trips made by Donald Trump
- List of international trips made by Rex Tillerson as United States Secretary of State
- List of international trips made by Mike Pompeo as United States Secretary of State
