= Caso (surname) =

Caso is a surname. Notable people with the surname include:

- Alexandra Caso (born 1987), Dominican volleyball player
- Alfonso Caso (1896–1970), Mexican archaeologist
- Ana de Armas Caso (born 1988), Cuban-Spanish actress
- Ángeles Caso (born 1959), Spanish journalist, translator and writer
- Antonio Caso Andrade (1883–1946), Mexican philosopher
- Beatriz Caso (1929–2006), Mexican sculptor
- Carmen Rosa Caso (born 1981), Dominican Republican volleyball player
- Domenico Caso (born 1954), Italian football coach and player
- Eduardo Morales Caso (born 1969), Cuban composer
- Giuseppe Caso (born 1998), Italian football player
- Jacques de Caso (born 1928), French-born American historian
- Javier Caso (born 1986), Mexican footballer
- José Luis Caso Cortines (1933–1997), Spanish politician, a victim of ETA
- Laurence Caso, American television producer
- Luis Videgaray Caso (born 1968), Mexican politician
- Michel De Caso (born 1956), French visual artist
- Mike Caso (born 1984), American football player
- Pere Borrell del Caso (1835–1910), Spanish painter
- Ralph G. Caso (1917–1998), American politician
- Tony Caso (fl. 1980s), American recording artist
- Vincent Caso (born 1991), American actor

== See also ==
- Caso (disambiguation)
