= List of international trips made by Rex Tillerson as United States Secretary of State =

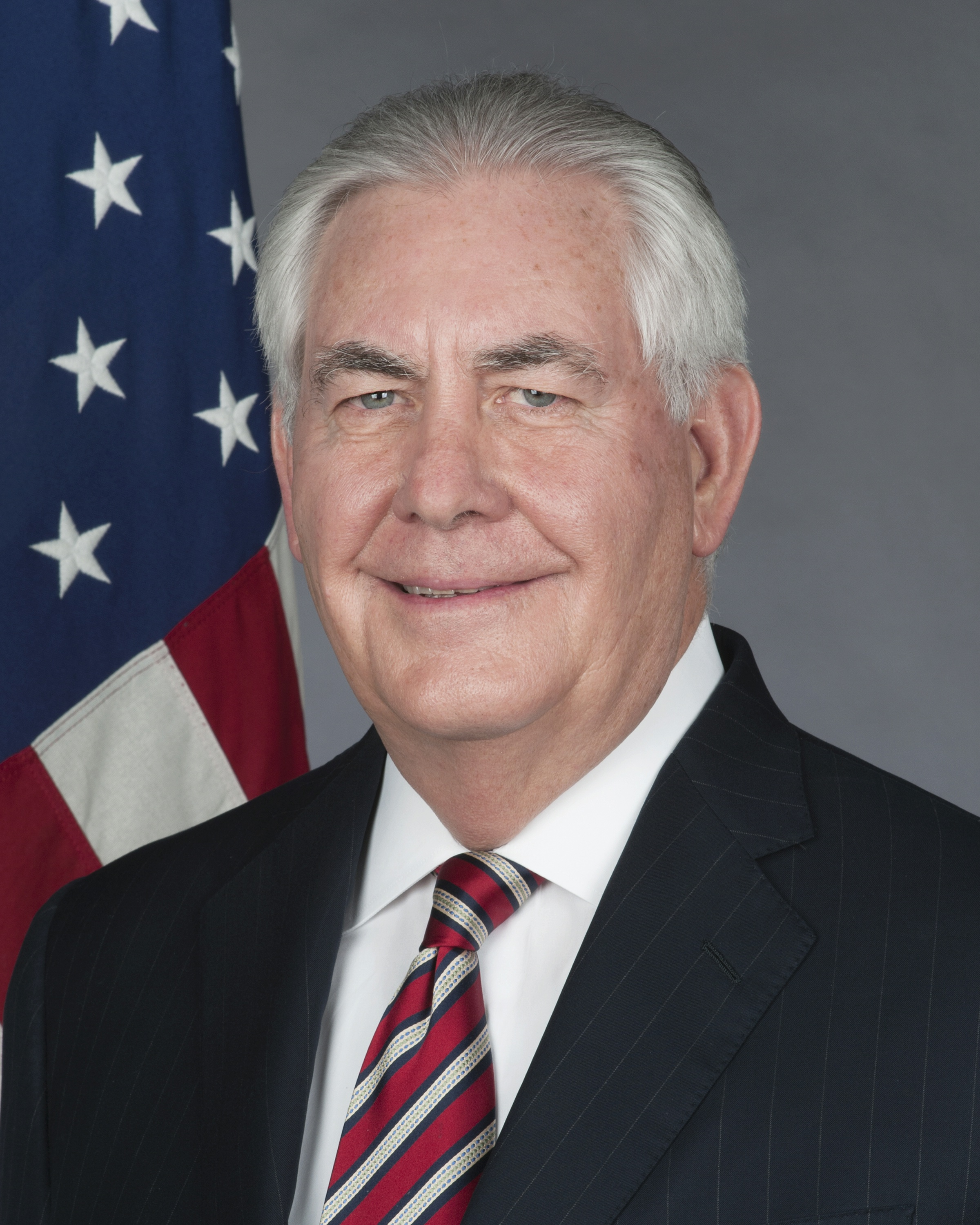
Official portrait of Rex Tillerson as Secretary of State, 2017

This is a list of international visits undertaken by Rex Tillerson (in office 2017–2018) while serving as the 69th United States secretary of state. The list includes both private travel and official state visits. The list includes only foreign travel which he made during his tenure in the position.

== Summary ==
The number of visits per country or territory where Secretary Tillerson traveled are:

- One visit to Afghanistan, Argentina, Australia, Austria, Chad, Colombia, Djibouti, Egypt, Ethiopia, India, Iraq, Israel, Jamaica, Jordan, Kenya, Lebanon, Malaysia, Myanmar, New Zealand, Nigeria, Pakistan, the Palestinian National Authority, Peru, Russia, Thailand, Ukraine, Vatican City and Vietnam
- Two visits to Canada, France, Germany, Japan, Mexico, the Philippines, Poland, and South Korea
- Three visits to Belgium, China, Italy, Kuwait, Qatar, Saudi Arabia, Switzerland, Turkey, and the United Kingdom

== Table ==
	Country	Locations	Dates	Details	Images
1	Germany	Bonn	February 15–17, 2017	Attended a G-20 Foreign Ministers' Meeting.	Secretary Tillerson with G20 Foreign Ministers in Bonn, February 2017
2	Mexico	Mexico City	February 22–23, 2017	Discussed bilateral relations with President Enrique Peña Nieto and Foreign Minister Luis Videgaray. Was joined by Secretary of Homeland Security John Kelly.	Secretary Tillerson and Homeland Security Secretary Kelly with Mexican Foreign Minister Luis Videgaray in Mexico City, February 2017
3	Japan	Tokyo	March 15–16, 2017	Met with Prime Minister Shinzo Abe and Foreign Minister Fumio Kishida.	Secretary Tillerson with Japanese Prime Minister Shinzo Abe in Tokyo, March 2017
3	South Korea	Seoul	March 17–18, 2017	Met with Acting President Hwang Kyo-ahn and Foreign Minister Yun Byung-se. Visited the Demilitarized Zone.	Secretary Tillerson with South Korean Acting President Hwang Kyo-ahn in Seoul, March 2017
3	China	Beijing	March 18–19, 2017	Met with President & CCP General Secretary Xi Jinping, Foreign Minister Wang Yi and State Counselor Yang Jiechi.	Secretary Tillerson with Chinese leader Xi Jinping in Beijing, March 2017
4	Turkey	Ankara	March 30–31, 2017	Met with President Recep Erdoğan, Prime Minister Binali Yıldırım, and Foreign Minister Mevlüt Çavuşoğlu.	Secretary Tillerson with Turkish President Recep Erdoğan in Ankara, March 2017
4	Belgium	Brussels	March 31, 2017	Attended a NATO Ministerial Meeting.	Secretary Tillerson with NATO Foreign Ministers in Brussels, March 2017
5	Italy	Lucca	April 9–11, 2017	Attended a G-7 Foreign Ministers' Meeting.	Secretary Tillerson with G7 Foreign Ministers in Lucca, April 2017
5	Russia	Moscow	April 11–13, 2017	Met with Foreign Minister Sergey Lavrov and President Vladimir Putin.	Secretary Tillerson with Russian Foreign Minister Sergey Lavrov in Moscow, April 2017
6	Saudi Arabia	Riyadh	May 20–22, 2017	Accompanied President Trump.	Secretary Tillerson with President Trump and Saudi King Salman in Riyadh, May 2017
6	Israel	Jerusalem	May 22–23, 2017	Accompanied President Trump.	Secretary Tillerson with President Trump and Israeli President Reuven Rivlin in Jerusalem, May 2017
6	Palestinian National Authority	Bethlehem	May 23, 2017	Accompanied President Trump.	
6	Italy	Rome	May 23–24, 2017	Accompanied President Trump.	
6	Vatican City	Vatican City	May 24, 2017	Accompanied President Trump.	
6	Belgium	Brussels	May 24–25, 2017	Accompanied President Trump.	Secretary Tillerson with President Trump and EU High Representative Federica Mogherini in Brussels, May 2017
6	Italy	Taormina	May 25–26, 2017	Accompanied President Trump to the G-7 Economic Summit.	
6	United Kingdom	London	May 26, 2017	Met with Foreign Secretary Boris Johnson. Signed book of condolences for the Manchester terrorist attack.	Secretary Tillerson with British Foreign Secretary Boris Johnson in London, May 2017
7	Australia	Sydney	June 5–6, 2017	Attended the Australia–U.S. Ministerial Consultations.	Secretary Tillerson and Defense Secretary Mattis with Australian Prime Minister Malcolm Turnbull, Foreign Minister Julie Bishop, and Defense Minister Marise Payne in Sydney, June 2017
7	New Zealand	Wellington	June 6–7, 2017	Met with Prime Minister Bill English and Foreign Minister Gerry Brownlee.	Secretary Tillerson with New Zealander Prime Minister Bill English in Wellington, June 2017
8	Germany	Hamburg	July 5–9, 2017	Accompanied President Trump to the G-20 Summit.	Secretary Tillerson with President Trump, Russian President Vladimir Putin and Foreign Minister Sergey Lavrov in Hamburg, July 2017
8	Ukraine	Kyiv	July 9, 2017	Met with President Petro Poroshenko.	Secretary Tillerson with Ukrainian President Petro Poroshenko in Kyiv, July 2017
8	Turkey	Istanbul	July 9–10, 2017	Met with President Recep Erdoğan and Foreign Minister Mevlüt Çavuşoğlu.	Secretary Tillerson with Turkish Foreign Minister Mevlüt Çavuşoğlu in Istanbul, July 2017
8	Kuwait	Kuwait City	July 10–11, 2017	Met with Emir Sheikh Sabah al-Ahmad al-Sabah and senior Kuwaiti officials.	Secretary Tillerson with Kuwaiti Emir Sheikh Sabah al-Ahmad al-Sabah in Kuwait City, July 2017
8	Qatar	Doha	July 11, 2017	Met with Emir Sheikh Tamim bin Hamad al-Thani and Foreign Minister Sheikh Mohammed bin Abdulrahman al-Thani. Signed MOU to prevent financing of terrorism.	Secretary Tillerson with Qatari Emir Tamim bin Hamad al-Thani in Doha, July 2017
8	Saudi Arabia	Jeddah	July 11–12, 2017	Met with King Salman bin Abdulaziz al-Saud, Crown Prince Mohammed bin Salman, and the Foreign Ministers of Saudi Arabia, Bahrain, the United Arab Emirates, and Egypt.	Secretary Tillerson with Saudi Crown Prince Mohammed bin Salman in Jeddah, July 2017
8	Kuwait	Kuwait City	July 12–13, 2017	Met with Foreign Minister Sabah al-Khalid al-Sabah.	
8	Qatar	Doha	July 13, 2017	Met with Emir Tamim bin Hamad al-Thani.	
9	Philippines	Manila	August 6–8, 2017	Attended the U.S.–ASEAN Ministerial Meeting.	Secretary Tillerson participates in the ASEAN-U.S. Ministeral in Manila, August 2017
9	Thailand	Bangkok	August 8, 2017	Met with Prime Minister Prayut Chan-o-cha and Foreign Minister Don Pramudwinai.	Secretary Tillerson with Thai Prime Minister Prayut Chan-o-cha in Bangkok, August 2017
9	Malaysia	Kuala Lumpur	August 8–9, 2017	Met with Deputy Prime Minister Zahid Hamidi.	Secretary Tillerson with Malaysian Prime Minister Najib Razak in Kuala Lumpur, August 2017
10	United Kingdom	London	September 14, 2017	Attended a Six-Party Ministerial Meeting on Libya. Met with Prime Minister Theresa May.	Secretary Tillerson participates in a Six-Party Ministerial Meeting on Libya in London, September 2017
11	China	Beijing	September 30 – October 1, 2017	Met with President & CCP General Secretary Xi Jinping, Foreign Minister Wang Yi, and State Councilor Yang Jiechi.	Secretary Tillerson with Chinese leader Xi Jinping in Beijing, September 2017
12	Saudi Arabia	Riyadh	October 21–22, 2017	Met with King Salman bin Abdulaziz al-Saud, Crown Prince Mohammed bin Salman, and Foreign Minister Adel al-Jubeir. Attended the first meeting of the Saudi Arabia–Iraq Coordination Council.	Secretary Tillerson with Saudi King Salman in Riyadh, October 2017
12	Qatar	Doha	October 22–23, 2017	Met with Emir Sheikh Tamim bin Hamad al-Thani and Foreign Minister Sheikh Mohammed bin Abdulrahman bin Jassim al-Thani.	Secretary Tillerson with Qatari Emir Sheikh Tamim bin Hamad al-Thani in Doha, October 2017
12	Afghanistan	Bagram	October 23, 2017	Met with President Ashraf Ghani.	Secretary Tillerson with Afghan President Ashraf Ghani in Bagram, October 2017
12	Iraq	Baghdad	October 23, 2017	Met with Prime Minister Haidar al-Abadi.	
12	Pakistan	Islamabad	October 24, 2017	Met with senior Pakistani officials.	Secretary Tillerson with Pakistani Prime Minister Shahid Khaqan Abbasi in Islamabad, October 2017
12	India	New Delhi	October 25, 2017	Met with Prime Minister Narendra Modi and Foreign Minister Sushma Swaraj.	Secretary Tillerson with Indian Prime Minister in New Delhi, October 2017
12	Switzerland	Geneva	October 26, 2017	Met with UN Special Envoy Staffan de Mistura, UN High Commissioner for Refugees Filippo Grandi, and International Committee of the Red Cross President Peter Maurer.	
13	Japan	Tokyo	November 5–7, 2017	Accompanied President Trump.	Secretary Tillerson with President Trump and Japanese Prime Minister Shinzo Abe in Tokyo, November 2017
13	South Korea	Seoul	November 5–8, 2017	Accompanied President Trump.	Secretary Tillerson with President Trump in Seoul, November 2017
13	China	Beijing	November 8–10, 2017	Accompanied President Trump.	Secretary Tillerson with President Trump in Beijing, November 2017
13	Vietnam	Da Nang; Hanoi	November 10–12, 2017	Accompanied President Trump to an APEC Meeting.	Secretary Tillerson with President Trump, Vietnamese President Trần Đại Quang and Foreign Minister Phạm Bình Minh in Hanoi, November 2017
13	Philippines	Manila	November 12–14, 2017	Accompanied President Trump to ASEAN Summit Meetings.	Secretary Tillerson participates the East Asia Summit in Manila, November 2017
13	Myanmar	Nay Pyi Taw	November 15, 2017	Met with State Councilor Aung San Suu Kyi and Commander-in-Chief Min Aung Hlaing.	Secretary Tillerson with Burmese State Counsellor Aung San Suu Kyi in Naypyidaw, November 2017
14	Belgium	Brussels	December 4–6, 2017	Attended a NATO Foreign Ministers Meeting and met with EU Foreign Ministers.	Secretary Tillerson with EU High Representative Federica Mogherini in Brussels, December 2017
14	Austria	Vienna	December 7, 2017	Attended an OSCE Ministerial Council Meeting.	Secretary Tillerson participates in the OSCE Ministerial Council in Vienna, December 2017
14	France	Paris	December 8, 2017	Attended the International Support Group for Lebanon Ministerial Meeting and met with President Emmanuel Macron and Foreign Minister Jean-Yves Le Drian.	Secretary Tillerson with French President Emmanuel Macron in Paris, December 2017
15	Canada	Ottawa	December 19, 2017	Met with Prime Minister Justin Trudeau and Foreign Minister Chrystia Freeland.	Secretary Tillerson with Canadian Prime Minister Justin Trudeau in Ottawa, December 2017
16	Canada	Vancouver	January 15–17, 2018	Co-hosted the Vancouver Foreign Ministers’ Meeting on Security and Stability on the Korean Peninsula with Canadian Foreign Minister Chrystia Freeland.	Secretary Tillerson participates in the Vancouver Foreign Ministers' Meeting on Security and Stability on the Korean Peninsula in Vancouver, January 2018
17	United Kingdom	London	January 21–22, 2018	Met with Prime Minister Theresa May, Foreign Secretary Boris Johnson, and National Security Advisor Mark Sedwill.	Secretary Tillerson with British Prime Minister Theresa May in London, January 2018
17	France	Paris	January 23–24, 2018	Met with senior French officials and attended the launch of the International Partnership against Impunity for the Use of Chemical Weapons.	Secretary Tillerson participates in the conference launching the International Partnership against Impunity for the Use of Chemical Weapons in Paris, January 2018
17	Switzerland	Davos	January 24–26, 2018	Attended the 2018 World Economic Forum.	
17	Poland	Warsaw	January 26–27, 2018	Discussed bilateral relations with senior Polish officials.	Secretary Tillerson with Polish Prime Minister Mateusz Morawiecki in Warsaw, January 2018
18	Mexico	Mexico City	February 1–2, 2018	Met with President Enrique Peña Nieto and Foreign Secretary Luis Videgaray.	Secretary Tillerson with Mexican President Enrique Peña Nieto in Mexico City, February 2018
18	Argentina	San Carlos de Bariloche, Buenos Aires	February 3–4, 2018	Met with President Mauricio Macri and Foreign Minister Jorge Faurie.	Secretary Tillerson with Argentine President Mauricio Macri in Buenos Aires, February 2018
18	Peru	Lima	February 5–6, 2018	Met with President Pedro Pablo Kuczynski and Foreign Minister Cayetana Aljovín.	Secretary Tillerson with Peruvian President Pedro Pablo Kuczynski in Lima, February 2018
18	Colombia	Bogotá	February 6, 2018	Met with President Juan Manuel Santos and Foreign Minister María Ángela Holguín.	Secretary Tillerson with Colombian President Juan Manuel Santos in Bogotá, February 2018
18	Jamaica	Kingston	February 7, 2018	Met with Prime Minister Andrew Holness and Foreign Minister Kamina Johnson-Smith.	Secretary Tillerson with Jamaican Prime Minister Andrew Holness in Kingston, February 2018
19	Egypt	Cairo	February 12, 2018	Met with senior Egyptian officials.	Secretary Tillerson with Egyptian Foreign Minister Sameh Shoukry in Cairo, February 2018
19	Kuwait	Kuwait City	February 12–13, 2018	Led the U.S. delegation to the Ministerial Meeting of the Global Coalition to Defeat ISIS in Kuwait and participated in the Iraq Reconstruction Conference.	Secretary Tillerson participates in the Ministerial Meeting of the Global Coalition to Defeat ISIS in Kuwait City, February 2018
19	Jordan	Amman	February 14, 2018	Met with King Abdullah II and Jordanian Foreign Minister Ayman Al-Safadi.	Secretary Tillerson with Jordanian Foreign Minister Ayman Al-Safadi in Amman, February 2018
19	Lebanon	Beirut	February 15, 2018	Met with Lebanese President Michel Aoun, Prime Minister Saad Hariri, and Speaker of Parliament Nabih Berri.	Secretary Tillerson with Lebanese Prime Minister Saad Hariri in Beirut, February 2018
19	Turkey	Ankara	February 15–16, 2018	Met with senior Turkish officials.	Secretary Tillerson with Turkish President Recep Tayyip Erdoğan in Ankara, February 2018
20	Ethiopia	Addis Ababa	March 6–8, 2018	Met with Ethiopian Prime Minister Hailemariam Desalegn, Ethiopian Foreign Minister Workneh Gebeyehu, and African Union Commission Chairperson Moussa Faki Mahamat.	Secretary Tillerson with Ethiopian Prime Minister Hailemariam Desalegn in Addis Ababa, March 2018
20	Djibouti	Djibouti City	March 9, 2018	Met With Djiboutian President Ismaïl Omar Guelleh and Foreign Minister Mahamoud Ali Youssouf.	Secretary Tillerson with Djiboutian President Ismail Omar Guelleh in Djibouti, March 2018
20	Kenya	Nairobi	March 9–11, 2018	Met with Kenyan President Uhuru Kenyatta and Foreign Minister Monica Juma.	Secretary Tillerson with Kenyan President Uhuru Kenyatta in Nairobi, March 2018
20	Chad	N'Djamena	March 12, 2018	Met with Chadian President Idriss Deby and Foreign Minister Mahamat Zene Cherif.	Secretary Tillerson with Chadian President Idriss Déby in N’Djamena, March 2018
20	Nigeria	Abuja	March 12, 2018	Met with Nigerian President Muhammadu Buhari and Foreign Minister Geoffrey Onyeama.	Secretary Tillerson with Nigerian President Muhammadu Buhari in Abuja, March 2018

== See also ==
- Foreign policy of the first Trump administration
- List of international presidential trips made by Donald Trump
