= List of international presidential trips made by Donald Trump =

Donald Trump, the 45th and 47th president of the United States, made 19 international trips to 25 countries (in addition to visiting the West Bank) during his first presidency, which began on January 20, 2017, and ended on January 20, 2021. As of November 2026, Trump has made 14 international trips to 19 countries during his second presidency, which began on January 20, 2025.

Due to the COVID-19 pandemic, he did not make any international trips between February 2020 and the end of his first presidency.

== Summary ==
=== First presidency (2017–2021) ===
The number of visits per country where President Trump traveled during his first presidency are:

- One: Afghanistan, Argentina, Canada, China, Finland, India, Iraq, Israel, North Korea, the Philippines, Poland, Saudi Arabia, Singapore, the Vatican City, and the West Bank
- Two: Belgium, Germany, Ireland, Italy, South Korea, Switzerland, and Vietnam
- Three: Japan and the United Kingdom
- Four: France

Map of international trips made by Donald Trump during his first presidency: One visit Two visits Three visits Four visits United States

=== Second presidency (2025–present) ===
The number of visits per country where President Trump traveled during his second presidency are:

- One: Canada, Egypt, France, Ireland, Israel, Italy, Japan, Malaysia, the Netherlands, the Philippines, Saudi Arabia, South Korea, Switzerland, Turkey, the United Arab Emirates and Vatican City
- Two: China, Qatar and the United Kingdom

List of international trips made by Donald Trump during his second presidency: One visit Two visits Three visits Four visits United States

== First presidency (2017–2021) ==
=== 2017 ===
	Country	Areas visited	Dates	Details	Image
1	Saudi Arabia	Riyadh	May 20–22	Met with King Salman and Muslim leaders at the Riyadh Summit. Signed a $110 billion arms deal with Saudi Arabia, and was honored with the Collar of Abdulaziz Al Saud, his first foreign order. Visited, along with First Lady Melania Trump, the National Museum of Saudi Arabia.	
1	Israel	Jerusalem	May 22–23	Met with President Reuven Rivlin and Prime Minister Benjamin Netanyahu. Visited the Western Wall and the Church of the Holy Sepulchre, the first sitting U.S. president to do so. Visited the Yad Vashem and delivered an address at the Israel Museum.	
1	Palestine	Bethlehem	May 23	Met with Palestinian president Mahmoud Abbas.	
1	Italy	Rome	May 23–24	Met with President Sergio Mattarella and Prime Minister Paolo Gentiloni.	
1	Vatican City State	Vatican City	May 24	Met with Pope Francis.	
1	Belgium	Brussels	May 24–25	Met with King Philippe and Prime Minister Charles Michel. Attended the 28th NATO summit and the U.S.–EU Summit Meeting, where he also met with French president Emmanuel Macron.	
1	Italy	Taormina	May 25–27	Attended the 43rd G7 summit. Also held a bilateral meeting with Japanese prime minister Shinzo Abe.	
2	Poland	Warsaw	July 5–6	Met with President Andrzej Duda and Croatian president Kolinda Grabar-Kitarović. Attended the 2nd summit of the Three Seas Initiative. He delivered a speech to the People of Poland in front of the Warsaw Uprising Monument at the Krasiński Square to honor victims of the past Nazi occupation and communist domination in Poland.	
2	Germany	Hamburg	July 6–8	Attended the G-20 summit. Also held bilateral meetings with British prime minister Theresa May, Chinese president & CCP general secretary Xi Jinping, German chancellor Angela Merkel, Indonesian president Joko Widodo, Japanese prime minister Shinzo Abe, Mexican president Enrique Peña Nieto, Russian president Vladimir Putin and Singaporean prime minister Lee Hsien Loong.	
3	France	Paris	July 13–14	Met with President Emmanuel Macron. Participated in the Bastille Day celebrations marking the 100th anniversary of the entry of the United States into World War I.	
4	Japan	Kawagoe, Tokyo	November 5–7	Met with Emperor Akihito at the Tokyo Imperial Palace and Prime Minister Shinzo Abe at Akasaka Palace.	
4	South Korea	Osan, Seoul	November 7–8	State visit. Met with South Korean president Moon Jae-in, and addressed the South Korean National Assembly. Also met with troops from the Eighth United States Army at Camp Humphreys. This was the president's first trip to a U.S. combat zone.	
4	China	Beijing	November 8–10	Main article: 2017 state visit by Donald Trump to China State visit. President Trump arrived in Beijing to meet with CCP General Secretary and President Xi Jinping and Premier Li Keqiang.	
4	Vietnam	Da Nang, Hanoi	November 10–12	State visit. Met with Communist Party General Secretary Nguyễn Phú Trọng, President Trần Đại Quang and Prime Minister Nguyễn Xuân Phúc. Attended the APEC Vietnam 2017.	
4	Philippines	Manila, Pasay	November 12–14	Attended the 31st ASEAN Summit. Met with President Rodrigo Duterte.	

=== 2018 ===
	Country	Areas visited	Dates	Details	Image
5	Switzerland	Davos	January 25–26	Attended the World Economic Forum; also held bilateral meetings with British prime minister Theresa May and Israeli prime minister Benjamin Netanyahu.	
6	Canada	La Malbaie	June 8–9	Attended the 44th G7 summit at the Manoir Richelieu in La Malbaie. Also held bilateral meetings with prime minister Justin Trudeau and French president Emmanuel Macron. Trump left the summit several hours early.	
6	Singapore	Central Area, Sentosa Island	June 10–12	After a refueling stop at Crete Naval Base in Greece, President Trump attended the summit meeting with North Korean chairman Kim Jong Un, becoming the first sitting U.S. president to meet a North Korean chairman. Also met with Prime Minister Lee Hsien Loong.	
7	Belgium	Brussels	July 10–12	Attended the 29th NATO summit; also held bilateral meetings with NATO secretary general Jens Stoltenberg, French president Emmanuel Macron and German chancellor Angela Merkel.	
7	United Kingdom	London, Blenheim Palace, Chequers, Windsor Castle, Turnberry	July 12–15	Met with Queen Elizabeth II and Prime Minister Theresa May. Spent weekend in Scotland and visited his golf course in Turnberry.	
7	Finland	Helsinki	July 15–16	Attended the summit meeting with Russian president Vladimir Putin. Also met with President Sauli Niinistö.	
8	France	Paris	November 9–11	Met with President Emmanuel Macron. Participated in the Armistice Day celebrations marking the 100th anniversary of the Armistice with Germany that brought major hostilities of World War I to an end. Visited the Suresnes American Cemetery and Memorial.	
9	Argentina	Buenos Aires	November 29 – December 1	Attended the G-20 summit. Also held bilateral meetings with Argentinian president Mauricio Macri, Australian prime minister Scott Morrison, Chinese president & CCP general secretary Xi Jinping, German chancellor Angela Merkel, Indian prime minister Narendra Modi, Japanese prime minister Shinzo Abe, South Korean president Moon Jae-in, and Turkish president Recep Tayyip Erdoğan.	
10	Iraq	Al Asad Airbase	December 26	Visited with U.S. military personnel serving in Western Iraq accompanied by First Lady Melania Trump. This was the president's second trip to a U.S. combat zone.	
10	Germany	Ramstein Air Base	December 26–27	Visited with United States Armed Forces serving in Rhineland-Palatinate, Germany.	

=== 2019 ===
	Country	Areas visited	Dates	Details	Image
11	Vietnam	Hanoi	February 26–28	Attended the summit meeting with North Korean leader Kim Jong Un. Also met with Communist Party general secretary and President Nguyễn Phú Trọng and Prime Minister Nguyễn Xuân Phúc. Trump made a refueling stop at an airbase in Qatar on the trip to Vietnam.	
12	Japan	Tokyo, Yokosuka	May 25–28	State visit. Met with Emperor Naruhito at the Tokyo Imperial Palace and Prime Minister Shinzo Abe at Akasaka Palace. Visited with troops and delivered remarks on the USS Wasp at Yokosuka Naval Base.	
13	United Kingdom	London, Portsmouth	June 3–5	Main article: 2019 state visit by Donald Trump to the United Kingdom State Visit. Met with Queen Elizabeth II, Prince Charles, and Duchess Camilla at Buckingham Palace and Prime Minister Theresa May at 10 Downing Street. Laid a wreath on the Tomb of the Unknown Warrior in Westminster Abbey. Attended the 75th anniversary of D-Day commemorative ceremonies.	
13	Ireland	Shannon, County Clare	June 5–6	Met with Taoiseach Leo Varadkar. Spent one night at his International golf resort in Doonbeg.	
13	France	Colleville, Caen	June 6	Met with President Emmanuel Macron. Attended the 75th anniversary of D-Day memorial ceremonies. Visited the Normandy American Cemetery and Memorial.	
13	Ireland	Shannon, County Clare	June 6–7	Spent one night at his International golf resort in Doonbeg	
14	Japan	Osaka	June 27–29	Attended the G-20 summit. Also held bilateral meetings with Australian prime minister Scott Morrison, Brazilian president Jair Bolsonaro, Chinese president & CCP general secretary Xi Jinping, German chancellor Angela Merkel, Indian prime minister Narendra Modi, Japanese prime minister Shinzo Abe, Saudi crown prince Mohammed bin Salman, Turkish president Recep Tayyip Erdoğan and Russian president Vladimir Putin.	
14	South Korea	Seoul, Korean Demilitarized Zone	June 29–30	Met with President Moon Jae-in. Visited the Korean Demilitarized Zone. Attended the Koreas–United States DMZ Summit with President Moon and North Korean chairman Kim Jong Un at the Inter-Korean Freedom House on the southern side of the Joint Security Area of the Korean Demilitarized Zone. Visited U.S. troops at Osan Air Base.	
14	North Korea	Joint Security Area	June 30	Briefly walked into the northern side of the Joint Security Area of the Korean Demilitarized Zone, accompanied by North Korean chairman Kim Jong Un, becoming the first sitting U.S. president to enter North Korea.	
15	France	Biarritz	August 24–26	Attended the 45th G7 summit at the Hôtel du Palais in Biarritz. Also held bilateral meetings with Australian prime minister Scott Morrison, British prime minister Boris Johnson, Canadian prime minister Justin Trudeau, Egyptian president Abdel Fattah el-Sisi, French president Emmanuel Macron, German chancellor Angela Merkel, Indian prime minister Narendra Modi and Japanese prime minister Shinzo Abe.	
16	Afghanistan	Bagram Airfield	November 28	Visited with U.S. military personnel serving in Eastern Afghanistan accompanied by First Lady Melania Trump. This was the president's fourth trip to a U.S. combat zone. Also met with President Ashraf Ghani.	
17	United Kingdom	London, Watford	December 2–4	Attended the 30th NATO summit. Met with Queen Elizabeth II and Prime Minister Boris Johnson. Also held bilateral meetings with Canadian prime minister Justin Trudeau, Danish prime minister Mette Frederiksen, French president Emmanuel Macron, German chancellor Angela Merkel and Italian prime minister Giuseppe Conte.	

=== 2020 ===
	Country	Areas visited	Dates	Details	Image
18	Switzerland	Davos	January 21–22	Attended the World Economic Forum; also held bilateral meetings with European Commission president Ursula von der Leyen, Iraqi president Barham Salih, Iraqi Kurdish president Nechirvan Barzani, Pakistani prime minister Imran Khan, and Swiss president Simonetta Sommaruga.	
19	India	Ahmedabad, Agra, New Delhi	February 24–25	Addressed a "Namaste (Welcome) Trump" event with Prime Minister Narendra Modi in Ahmedabad. Toured Mahatma Gandhi's Sabarmati Ashram and the Taj Mahal. Received a formal welcome from President Ram Nath Kovind at the Rashtrapati Bhavan Presidential Palace in New Delhi. Conducted a series of meetings with Modi and other government officials, as well as Indian business executives.	

Due to the COVID-19 pandemic, he did not make any international trips between February 2020 and the end of his first presidency.

== Second presidency (2025–present) ==
=== 2025 ===
	Country	Areas visited	Dates	Details	Image
1	Italy	Rome	April 25–26	Transited through Italy to Vatican City for the funeral of Pope Francis. Spent the night at Villa Taverna, the residence of the U.S. ambassador to Italy.	
1	Vatican City State	Vatican City	April 26	Attended the funeral of Pope Francis at St. Peter's Square.	
2	Saudi Arabia	Riyadh	May 13–14	Main article: May 2025 visit by Donald Trump to the Middle East Met with Crown Prince Mohammed bin Salman and King Salman. Visited The Royal Court Palace and At-Turaif World Heritage Site for Saudi State dinner. Participated in a Saudi-U.S. Investment Forum at the King Abdulaziz Conference Center. Attended the GCC Summit. Also met with Syrian president Ahmed al-Sharaa, becoming the first sitting U.S. president to meet with a Syrian head of state since 2000.	
2	Qatar	Doha	May 14–15	Met with Emir Tamim bin Hamad Al Thani at the Amiri Diwan. Visited Lusail Palace for Qatari State dinner. Delivered remarks with troops at Al Udeid Air Base.	
2	United Arab Emirates	Abu Dhabi	May 15–16	Visited the Sheikh Zayed Grand Mosque. Met with President Mohamed bin Zayed Al Nahyan at Qasr Al Watan. Also visited the Abrahamic Family House. Trump made a refueling stop at RAF Mildenhall in the United Kingdom enroute back to the United States.	
3	Canada	Kananaskis	June 15–16	Attended the 51st G7 summit. Held bilateral meetings with Prime Minister Mark Carney, German chancellor Friedrich Merz and British prime minister Keir Starmer. Trump left the summit a day early.	
4	Netherlands	The Hague	June 24–25	Attended the 35th NATO summit at the World Forum. Met with King Willem-Alexander and Queen Máxima at Huis ten Bosch. Held bilateral meetings with Prime Minister Dick Schoof and NATO Secretary General Mark Rutte.	
5	United Kingdom	Turnberry and Aberdeenshire	July 25–29	Made a private trip to Scotland and visited his golf course in Turnberry as well as his property in Aberdeenshire. He met with European Commission president Ursula von der Leyen and successfully reached a trade deal with the European Union. He also met with Prime Minister Keir Starmer to finalize a trade agreement between the United States and the United Kingdom. Trump had a private dinner with the First minister of Scotland John Swinney, and met in a one to one meeting the following day where they discussed the war in Gaza, the Scottish economy, oil and gas taxation, and trade and tariffs particularly relating to Scotch Whisky.	
6	United Kingdom	Windsor, London, Chequers	September 16–18	Main article: 2025 state visit by Donald Trump to the United Kingdom State Visit. Met with King Charles III, Queen Camilla, Prince William, and Princess Catherine at Windsor Castle and Prime Minister Keir Starmer at Chequers. Visited tomb of Queen Elizabeth II at the King George VI Memorial Chapel at St George's Chapel.	
7	Israel	Jerusalem	October 13	Met with Prime Minister Benjamin Netanyahu, in order to finalize a Gaza hostages-for-ceasefire deal. Also met with hostage families and addressed the Knesset.	
7	Egypt	Sharm El Sheikh	October 13	Attended a Middle East Peace Ceremony at the Tonino Lamborghini International Convention Center in order to finalize a Gaza hostages-for-ceasefire deal.	
8	Qatar	Al Udeid Air Base	October 25	During a refueling stop en route to Malaysia, attended a bilateral meeting with Emir Tamim bin Hamad Al Thani and Prime Minister Mohammed bin Abdulrahman bin Jassim Al Thani.	
8	Malaysia	Kuala Lumpur	October 26–27	Attended the 47th ASEAN summit. Also attended the signing ceremony of a Kuala Lumpur Peace Accord with Cambodian prime minister Hun Manet and Thai prime minister Anutin Charnvirakul at the Kuala Lumpur Convention Centre. Met with Prime Minister Anwar Ibrahim, Vietnamese prime minister Phạm Minh Chính and Brazilian president Luiz Inácio Lula da Silva.	
8	Japan	Tokyo, Yokosuka	October 27–29	Met with Emperor Naruhito at the Tokyo Imperial Palace and Prime Minister Sanae Takaichi at Akasaka Palace. Visited with troops and delivered remarks on the USS George Washington at Yokosuka Naval Base.	
8	South Korea	Gyeongju, Busan	October 29–30	Met with President Lee Jae Myung at the Gyeongju National Museum. Was awarded the Grand Order of Mugunghwa. Delivered remarks at the APEC CEO Luncheon at Gyeongju Arts Center and participated in a U.S.–APEC Leaders Working Dinner at Hilton Hotel Gyeongju. In Busan, President Trump attended the summit meeting with Chinese leader Xi Jinping.	

=== 2026 ===
	Country	Areas visited	Dates	Details	Image
9	Switzerland	Davos	January 21–22	Attended the annual meeting of the World Economic Forum.	
10	China	Beijing	May 13–15	Main article: 2026 state visit by Donald Trump to China State visit. Met with CCP General Secretary and President Xi Jinping.	
11	France	Évian-les-Bains, Versailles	June 15–17	Attended the 52nd G7 summit. He held bilateral meetings with French President Emmanuel Macron, Qatari Emir Tamim bin Hamad Al Thani, Emirati President Mohamed bin Zayed Al Nahyan, Egyptian President Abdel Fattah el-Sisi, and Indian Prime Minister Narendra Modi. Attended a dinner with French President Emmanuel Macron at the Palace of Versailles and festivities celebrating the United States Semiquincentennial. Signed the Islamabad Memorandum.	
12	Turkey	Ankara	July 7–8	Attended the 36th NATO summit at the Presidential Complex of Turkey. He held bilateral meetings with Turkish President Recep Erdoğan, NATO Secretary General Mark Rutte, Ukrainian President Volodymyr Zelenskyy, and Syrian President Ahmed al-Sharaa. On the return trip, President Trump initially boarded the older Air Force One at Ankara Airport before secretly transferring to a Boeing C-32A via an airport catering truck amid an Iranian assassination threat. The older Air Force One continued to RAF Mildenhall as a decoy, while Trump traveled aboard the C-32A under the call sign "Reach 18". He later transferred to the newer plane at Mildenhall for the remainder of the trip back to Washington, D.C.	
13	Ireland	Dublin, County Clare	September 12–13	Participated in a courtesy call with President Catherine Connolly at Áras an Uachtaráin and met with Taoiseach Micheál Martin at Farmleigh. Also met with business leaders and embassy workers at Deerfield Residence and visited his golf resort near Doonbeg for the 2026 Irish Open.	
14	Philippines	Manila, Parañaque	November 17–18	State visit. Attended the 49th ASEAN Summit and a Quadrilateral Security Dialogue (Quad) leaders' meeting at Solaire Resort. Met with President Bongbong Marcos at Malacañang Palace and signed a trade deal with Thailand.	
14	China	Shenzhen	November 18–19	Attended the APEC China 2026. Held a working lunch with President Xi Jinping, a bilateral meeting with Russian President Vladimir Putin, and a trilateral meeting with both leaders.	

== Future trips ==
The following international trips are scheduled to be made by Donald Trump during 2026:

Country	Areas visited	Dates	Details
India	Delhi	mid-2027	President Trump plans to make a state visit to India.

== Multilateral meetings ==
=== First presidency ===
Multilateral meetings of the following intergovernmental organizations took place during Donald Trump's first presidency (2017–2021).

Group	Year			
Group	2017	2018	2019	2020
APEC	November 10–11 (Vietnam) Đà Nẵng	November 17–18^{[a]} (Papua New Guinea) Port Moresby	November 16–17 (canceled) (Chile) Santiago	November 20 (videoconference) (Malaysia) Kuala Lumpur
EAS (ASEAN)	November 13–14^{[b]} (Philippines) Pasay	November 14–15^{[a]} Singapore	November 4^{[c]} (Thailand) Bangkok	November 14^{[c]} (videoconference) (Vietnam) Hanoi
G7	May 26–27 (Italy) Taormina	June 8–9^{[d]} (Canada) La Malbaie	August 24–26 (France) Biarritz	June 10–12 (canceled) (United States) Camp David
G20	July 7–8 (Germany) Hamburg	November 30 – December 1 (Argentina) Buenos Aires	June 28–29 (Japan) Osaka	November 21–22 (videoconference) (Saudi Arabia) Riyadh
NATO	May 25 (Belgium) Brussels	July 11–12 (Belgium) Brussels	December 3–4 (United Kingdom) Watford	None
SOA (OAS)	None	April 13–14^{[a]} (Peru) Lima	None	None
Others	Riyadh summit May 20–21 (Saudi Arabia) Riyadh	None	United States–Caribbean summit March 22; Mar-a-Lago	None
Others	Three Seas Initiative; July 6 (Poland) Warsaw	None	DMZ summit June 30 (South Korea) Freedom House	None
Did not attend / participate Partially attended Virtual event^a Vice President Mike Pence attended the summit in the president's place.^b President Trump traveled to the Philippines to attend the ASEAN summit, but ultimately left early and Secretary of State Rex Tillerson participated in the president's place for the East Asia summit.^c Robert C. O'Brien attended the summit in the president's place.^d President Trump left the G7 summit several hours early to travel to Singapore for the summit meeting with North Korean chairman Kim Jong Un.

=== Second presidency ===
Multilateral meetings of the following intergovernmental organizations are scheduled to take place during Donald Trump's second presidency (2025–present).

Group	Year			
Group	2025	2026	2027	2028
APEC	October 31 – November 1^{[g]} (South Korea) Gyeongju	November 18–19 (China) Shenzhen	November (Vietnam) Phú Quốc	November; Mexico
EAS (ASEAN)	October 26–28^{[f]} (Malaysia) Kuala Lumpur	November 16–18^{[i]} (Philippines) Pasay	November 13–15; Singapore	TBD; Thailand
G7	June 16–17^{[e]} (Canada) Kananaskis	June 15–17 (France) Évian-les-Bains	TBD; United States	TBD; United Kingdom
G20	November 22–23^{[h]} (South Africa) Johannesburg	December 14–15 (United States) Doral	November 27–28 (United Kingdom) Manchester	TBD; South Korea
NATO	June 24–25 (Netherlands) The Hague	July 7–8 (Turkey) Ankara	TBD (Albania) Tirana	TBA
QUAD	None	November 17 (Philippines) Parañaque	TBD (India) New Delhi	TBA
SOA (OAS)	None	TBD (Dominican Republic) Punta Cana	TBA	TBA
Others	Multilateral meeting on Ukraine; August 18 (United States) Washington	Shield of the Americas; March 7 (United States) Doral, September 22 (United States) New York	TBA	TBA
Others	Gaza peace summit October 13 (Egypt) Sharm El Sheikh	Shield of the Americas; March 7 (United States) Doral, September 22 (United States) New York	TBA	TBA
Others	C5+1; November 6 (United States) Washington	Shield of the Americas; March 7 (United States) Doral, September 22 (United States) New York	TBA	TBA
Did not attend / participate Partially attended Future event^e President Trump unexpectedly left the G7 summit a day early to return to Washington, D.C. due to the Twelve-Day War.^f President Trump traveled to Malaysia to attend the ASEAN–U.S. summit, but ultimately left early. Assistant Secretary of State for East Asian and Pacific Affairs Michael G. DeSombre attended in the president's place for the East Asia summit.^g President Trump participated in various meetings on the sideline of APEC, but skipped the leaders' summit. Secretary of the Treasury Scott Bessent attended in the president's place.^h President Trump boycotted this G20 summit and stated that the United States would not send any representative, citing claims of Afrikaner persecution in South Africa.^i President Trump traveled to the Philippines to attend the ASEAN–U.S. summit. Under Secretary of State for Political Affairs Allison Hooker attended in the president's place for the East Asia summit.

== See also ==
- Foreign policy of the first Trump administration
- Foreign policy of the second Trump administration
- Foreign policy of the United States
- List of international trips made by Rex Tillerson as United States Secretary of State
- List of international trips made by Mike Pompeo as United States Secretary of State
- List of international trips made by Marco Rubio as United States Secretary of State
