= Manuel Zamarreño Villoria =

Spanish politician

Manuel Zamarreño Villoria (San Sebastián, January 6, 1955 - Rentería, June 25, 1998) was a Spanish politician assassinated by Basque terrorist group ETA.

== Biography ==
Manuel Zamarreño Villoria was killed by ETA in Rentería on June 25, 1998. He had been a councillor for 34 days in Rentería, replacing the also assassinated José Luis Caso, coppersmith as a profession, although he was unemployed. He was married and had two children.

=== Murder ===
Before being assassinated, Manuel Zamarreño had suffered attacks and threats. ETA set his vehicle on fire. On the morning of June 25, 1998, at about 11:10 a.m. Manuel Zamarreño left his home in the neighbourhood of Capuchinos de Rentería, to buy bread. Upon returning, ETA activated the three kilos of amonal that had been placed on a motorcycle that was parked on the sidewalk and whose pump was activated from distance. When the bomb exploded, Manuel Zamarreño was fully hit by it. He lay without life between two cars parked in battery, surrounded by a pool of blood and with clothes torn off.

The member of the Ertzaintza escorting him, Juan María Quintana, was also hit by the explosion and suffered injuries. He suffered from shrapnel and wounds in one eye. He was taken by ambulance to the hospital, where he was admitted with a shock wave syndrome, multiple injuries from shrapnel in a large part of the body and ocular trauma, so he was surgically operated. The blast wave of the explosion also caused major damages to several cars and homes. The Ertzaintza moved to the area and carried out the first steps. Two and a half hours later the judge ordered the lifting of the corpse.

The summary of this murder was initiated by the Central Court of Instruction No. 2 of the National Court. This court decreed by auto in December 1999 the provisional dismissal.

After this attack, there was no claim by ETA in the following days, though ETA were blamed. Since no judgment has been handed down for this attack, nor any investigation that attributes to the authors, the identity of the murderers is unknown.

== Bibliography ==
- MERINO, A., CHAPA, A., Raíces de Libertad. pp. 159–169. FPEV (2011). ISBN 978-84-615-0648-4.
- This article makes use of material translated from the corresponding article in the Spanish-language Wikipedia.
