= List of international trips made by Mike Pompeo as United States Secretary of State =

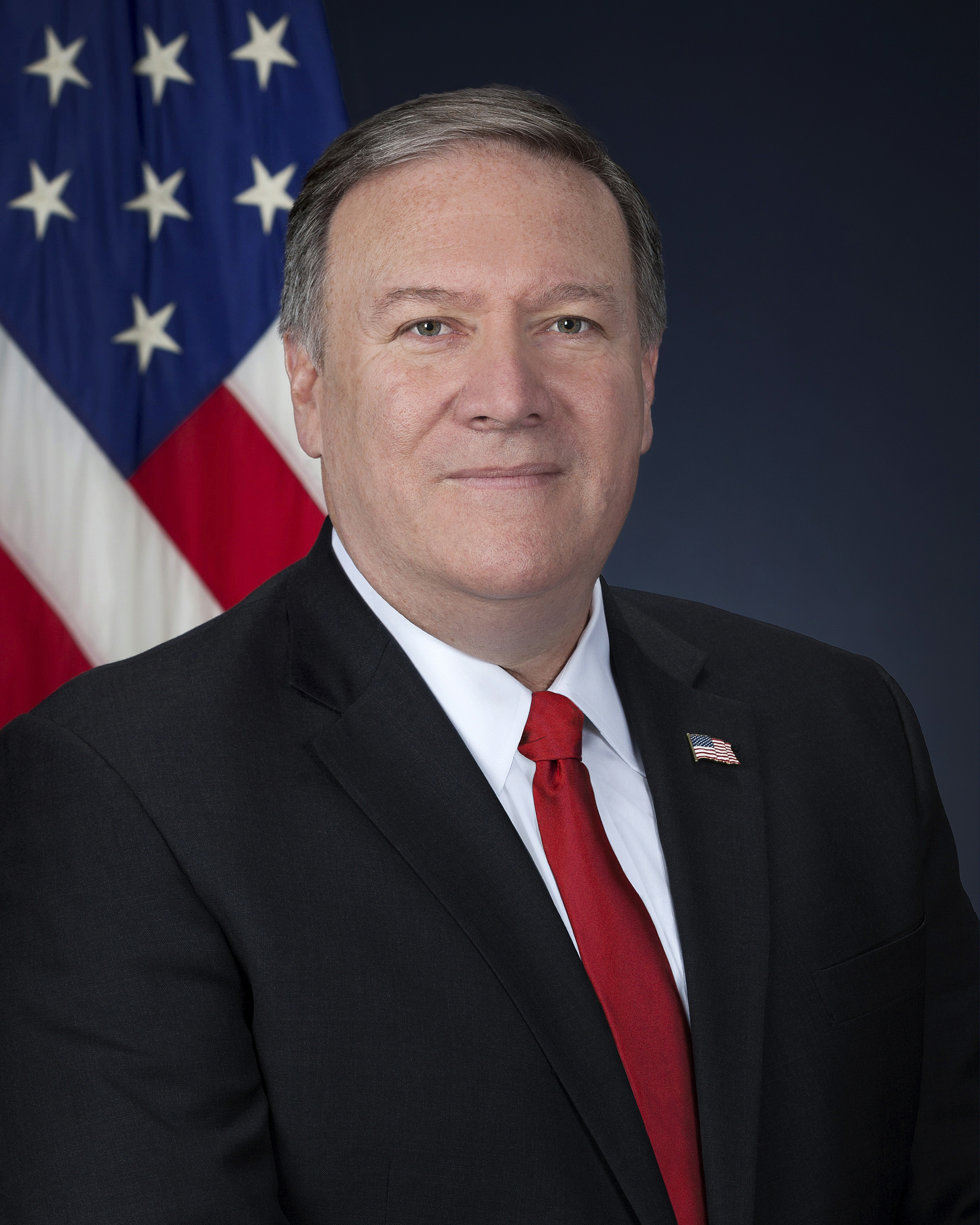
Official portrait of Mike Pompeo as Secretary of State, 2018

This is a list of international visits undertaken by Mike Pompeo (in office 2018–2021) while serving as the 70th United States secretary of state. The list includes both private travel and official state visits. The list includes only foreign travel which he made during his tenure in the position.

== Summary ==
The number of visits per country or territory where Secretary Pompeo traveled are:

- One visit to Angola, Australia, Austria, Belarus, Chile, Costa Rica, Croatia, Cyprus, Czech Republic, Denmark, Dominican Republic, Ecuador, Egypt, El Salvador, Ethiopia, Guyana, Hungary, Iceland, Jamaica, Kazakhstan, Kuwait, Lebanon, Malaysia, Micronesia, Montenegro, Morocco, Netherlands, North Macedonia, Panama, Pakistan, Paraguay, Peru, Philippines, Portugal, Russia, Senegal, Slovakia, Slovenia, Sri Lanka, Sudan, Suriname, Switzerland, Thailand, Ukraine and Uzbekistan
- Two visits to Argentina, Bahrain, Brazil, Canada, China, Finland, France, Greece, Indonesia, Iraq, Italy, Jordan, Poland, Singapore and Vatican City
- Three visits to Afghanistan, Colombia, India, Mexico, North Korea, Oman, South Korea, Turkey and Vietnam
- Four visits to Germany and Japan
- Five visits to Qatar and the United Kingdom
- Six visits to Israel and United Arab Emirates
- Seven visits to Belgium and Saudi Arabia

Map of international trips made by Mike Pompeo as secretary of state: United States 7 visits 6 visits 5 visits 4 visits 3 visits 2 visits 1 visit

== Table ==
	Country	Locations	Dates	Details	Images
1	Belgium	Brussels	April 26–27, 2018	Attended a NATO Foreign Ministers’ Meeting.	Secretary Pompeo with NATO Foreign Ministers in Brussels, April 2018
1	Saudi Arabia	Riyadh	April 28–29, 2018	Met with Saudi foreign minister Adel al-Jubeir.	Secretary Pompeo with Saudi Foreign Minister Adel al-Jubeir in Riyadh, April 2018
1	Israel	Tel Aviv	April 29, 2018	Met with Israeli prime minister Benjamin Netanyahu.	Secretary Pompeo with Israeli Prime Minister Benjamin Netanyahu in Tel Aviv, April 2018
1	Jordan	Amman	April 30, 2018	Met with King Abdullah II and Jordanian foreign minister Ayman al-Safadi. Also met with Japanese foreign minister Taro Kono.	Secretary Pompeo with King Abdullah II in Amman, April 2018
2	North Korea	Pyongyang	May 8–9, 2018	Met with chairman Kim Jong-un and other North Korean Government officials. Also secured the release of three Americans.	
3	Canada	Charlevoix	June 9, 2018	Accompanied President Trump to the G-7 meetings.	
3	Singapore	Singapore	June 10–13, 2018	Participated in the president's summit with North Korean leader Kim Jong-un and bilateral events with Singaporean prime minister Lee Hsien Loong.	Secretary Pompeo with President Trump and North Korean leader Kim Jong-un at the 2018 North Korea–United States summit in Singapore, June 2018
3	South Korea	Seoul	June 13–14, 2018	Met with senior Korean and Japanese officials to discuss the U.S.–Republic of Korea alliance, the U.S.–Japan alliance, and next steps in our shared approach to North Korea.	Secretary Pompeo with South Korean Foreign Minister Kang Kyung-wha and Japanese Foreign Minister Taro Kono in Seoul, June 2018
3	China	Beijing	June 14, 2018	Met with Chinese officials on bilateral, regional, and global issues that affect both countries.	Secretary Pompeo with Chinese President Xi Jinping in Beijing, June 2018
4	North Korea	Pyongyang	July 5–7, 2018	Continued consultations and implementation of the forward progress made by President Trump and Chairman Kim in Singapore.	
4	Japan	Tokyo	July 7–8, 2018	Met with Japanese and South Korean leaders to discuss our shared commitment to the final, fully verified denuclearization of the DPRK, as well as other bilateral and regional issues.	Secretary Pompeo with Japanese Prime Minister Shinzo Abe in Tokyo, July 2018
4	Vietnam	Hanoi	July 8–9, 2018	Met with senior Vietnamese officials to discuss our shared commitment to the final, fully verified denuclearization of the DPRK and other bilateral and regional issues.	Secretary Pompeo with Vietnamese General Secretary Nguyễn Phú Trọng in Hanoi, July 2018
4	Afghanistan	Kabul	July 9, 2018	Met with Afghan officials.	Secretary Pompeo with Afghan President Ashraf Ghani in Kabul, July 2018
4	United Arab Emirates	Abu Dhabi	July 9–10, 2018	Met with UAE leaders to discuss ways to further strengthen the U.S.–UAE partnership.	Secretary Pompeo with UAE Crown Prince Mohammed bin Zayed Al Nahyan in Abu Dhabi, July 2018
4	Belgium	Brussels	July 10–12, 2018	Accompanied President Trump to the NATO Summit and also participated in the U.S.–EU Energy Council and co-hosted a meeting of foreign ministers of the Global Coalition to Defeat ISIS.	Secretary Pompeo with Azerbaijani Foreign Minister Elmar Mammadyarov in Brussels, July 2018
5	Mexico	Mexico City	July 13, 2018	Met with President Enrique Peña Nieto, Foreign Secretary Luis Videgaray Caso, and president-elect Andrés Manuel López Obrador.	Secretary Pompeo with Mexican President Enrique Peña Nieto in Mexico City, July 2018
6	Finland	Helsinki	July 16, 2018	Accompanied President Trump to his meeting with Russian president Vladimir Putin. Also met with Russian foreign minister Sergey Lavrov and Finnish foreign minister Timo Soini, to discuss bilateral and regional issues.	Secretary Pompeo with President Trump and Russian president Vladimir Putin at the 2018 Russia–United States summit in Helsinki, July 2018
7	Malaysia	Kuala Lumpur	August 1–3, 2018	Met with senior Malaysian officials to discuss strengthening the Comprehensive Partnership and advancing common security and economic interests.	Secretary Pompeo with Malaysian Prime Minister Mahathir Mohamad in Kuala Lumpur, August 2018
7	Singapore	Singapore	August 3–4, 2018	Participated in annual ASEAN–centered ministerial meetings.	Secretary Pompeo participates in the ASEAN-U.S. Ministerial in Singapore, August 2018
7	Indonesia	Jakarta	August 4–5, 2018	Met with senior Indonesian officials to discuss U.S.–Indonesia Strategic Partnership.	Secretary Pompeo with Indonesian President Joko Widodo in Jakarta, August 2018
8	Pakistan	Islamabad	September 5, 2018	Met with Prime Minister Imran Khan, Foreign Minister Qureshi, and Chief of Army Staff Qamar Javed Bajwa to discuss U.S.–Pakistan bilateral relations.	Secretary Pompeo with Pakistani Prime Minister Imran Khan in Islamabad, September 2018
8	India	New Delhi	September 6, 2018	Participated in the inaugural U.S.–India “2+2” dialogue and met with senior officials.	Secretary Pompeo and Defense Secretary Mattis meet with Indian Prime Minister Narendra Modi in New Delhi, September 2018
9	Japan	Tokyo	October 6–7, 2018	Met with Prime Minister Shinzo Abe and Foreign Minister Taro Kono.	Secretary Pompeo with Japanese Prime Minister Shinzō Abe in Tokyo, October 2018
9	North Korea	Pyongyang	October 7, 2018	Met with Chairman Kim Jong-un.	Secretary Pompeo with North Korean leader Kim Jong-un in Pyongyang, October 2018
9	South Korea	Seoul	October 7–8, 2018	Met with President Moon Jae-in and Foreign Minister Kang Kyung-wha.	Secretary Pompeo with South Korean President Moon Jae-in in Seoul, October 2018
9	China	Beijing	October 8, 2018	Met with Chinese counterparts to discuss bilateral, regional, and global issues.	Secretary Pompeo with Chinese Foreign Minister Wang Yi in Beijing, October 2018
10	Saudi Arabia	Riyadh	October 15–17, 2018	Met with Crown Prince Mohammad bin Salman and Foreign Minister Adel al-Jubeir regarding the investigation into the disappearance of Jamal Khashoggi.	Secretary Pompeo with Saudi Crown Prince Mohammad bin Salman in Riyadh, October 2018
10	Turkey	Ankara	October 17, 2018	Met with Foreign Minister Mevlüt Çavuşoğlu and President Recep Tayyip Erdoğan.	Secretary Pompeo with Turkish President Recep Tayyip Erdoğan in Ankara, October 2018
10	Panama	Panama City	October 18, 2018	Met with President Juan Carlos Varela and vice president and foreign minister Isabel de Saint Malo de Alvarado to discuss ongoing U.S.–Panama collaboration on regional priorities.	Secretary Pompeo with Panamanian president Juan Carlos Varela in Panama City, October 2018
10	Mexico	Mexico City	October 19, 2018	Met with President Enrique Peña Nieto, Foreign Secretary Luis Videgaray Caso, and foreign secretary–designate Marcelo Luis Ebrard Casaubon.	Secretary Pompeo with Mexican president Enrique Peña Nieto in Mexico City, October 2018
11	France	Paris	November 10–11, 2018	Joined President Trump in commemorating the 100th anniversary of the end of the WWI. Also participated in the President's meeting with French president Emmanuel Macron.	Secretary Pompeo with President Trump at a ceremony marking the 100th anniversary of the end of WWI in Paris, November 2018
12	Argentina	Buenos Aires	November 29 – December 1, 2018	Supported President Trump’s participation in the G-20 Leaders’ Summit.	Secretary Pompeo with President Trump and Japanese Prime Minister Shinzo Abe in Buenos Aires, November 2018
13	Belgium	Brussels	December 3–5, 2018	Participated in the semi-annual meeting of NATO foreign ministers and also met with Belgian prime minister Charles Michel.	Secretary Pompeo with Belgian prime minister Charles Michel in Brussels, December 2018
14	Brazil	Brasília	December 31, 2018 – January 2, 2019	Led the U.S. delegation to the presidential inauguration of Jair Bolsonaro. Also met with Peruvian president Martin Vizcarra and Israeli prime minister Benjamin Netanyahu.	Secretary Pompeo attends the inauguration of Brazilian president Jair Bolsonaro in Brasília, January 2019
14	Colombia	Cartagena	January 2, 2019	Met with President Iván Duque.	
15	Jordan	Amman	January 8, 2019	Met with Jordanian leaders.	Secretary Pompeo with King Abdullah II of Jordan in Amman, January 2019
15	Iraq	Baghdad, Erbil	January 9, 2019	Met with Iraqi leaders.	Secretary Pompeo with Iraqi President Barham Salih in Baghdad, January 2019
15	Egypt	Cairo	January 10, 2019	Met with Egyptian leaders.	Secretary Pompeo with Egyptian President Abdel Fattah al-Sisi in Cairo, January 2019
15	Bahrain	Manama	January 11, 2019	Met with Bahraini leaders.	Secretary Pompeo with Bahraini Foreign Minister Khalid bin Ahmed Al Khalifa in Manama, January 2019
15	United Arab Emirates	Abu Dhabi	January 12–13, 2019	Met with leaders of the United Arab Emirates.	Secretary Pompeo with UAE Crown Prince Mohamed bin Zayed Al Nahyan in Abu Dhabi, January 2019
15	Qatar	Doha	January 13, 2019	Met with Qatari leaders.	Secretary Pompeo with Qatari Deputy Prime Minister and Foreign Minister Sheikh Mohammed bin Abdulrahman Al Thani in Doha, January 2019
15	Saudi Arabia	Riyadh	January 13–14, 2019	Met with Saudi leaders.	Secretary Pompeo with Saudi Crown Prince Mohammed bin Salman in Riyadh, January 2019
15	Oman	Muscat	January 14, 2019	Met with Omani leaders.	
16	Hungary	Budapest	February 11, 2019	Met with Prime Minister Orbán and Foreign Minister Szijjártó.	Secretary Pompeo with Hungarian Prime Minister Viktor Orban in Budapest, February 2019
16	Slovakia	Bratislava	February 12, 2019	Met with President Kiska, Prime Minister Pellegrini and Foreign Minister Lajčák.	Secretary Pompeo with Slovakian Prime Minister Peter Pellegrini in Bratislava, February 2019
16	Poland	Warsaw	February 12, 2019	Met with Foreign Minister Czaputowicz.	Secretary Pompeo with Polish Foreign Minister Jacek Czaputowicz in Warsaw, February 2019
16	Belgium	Brussels	February 13–14, 2019	Met with EU High Representative for Foreign Affairs and Security Policy Federica Mogherini.	Secretary Pompeo with EU High Representative Federica Mogherini in Brussels, February 2019
16	Iceland	Reykjavík	February 15, 2019	Met with Prime Minister Jakobsdóttir and Foreign Minister Thórdarson.	Secretary Pompeo with Icelandic Prime Minister Katrín Jakobsdóttir in Reykjavík, February 2019
17	Vietnam	Hanoi	February 24–28, 2019	Participated in the President's summit with North Korean leader Kim Jong-un and bilateral meetings with Vietnamese leaders.	Secretary Pompeo with President Trump and North Korean leader Kim Jong-un at the 2019 North Korea–United States summit in Hanoi, February 2019
17	Philippines	Manila	February 28 – March 1, 2019	Met with President Rodrigo Duterte and Foreign Secretary Teodoro Locsin, Jr.	Secretary Pompeo with Philippine President Rodrigo Duterte in Manila, February 2019
18	Kuwait	Kuwait City	March 18–20, 2019	Led the U.S. delegation at the third U.S.–Kuwait Strategic Dialogue.	
18	Israel	Jerusalem	March 20–21, 2019	Met with Israeli officials to engage on critical regional issues.	Secretary Pompeo with Israeli Prime Minister Benjamin Netanyahu, Cypriot President Nicos Anastasiades, and Greek Prime Minister Alexis Tsipras in Jerusalem, March 2019
18	Lebanon	Beirut	March 22–23, 2019	Met with Lebanese leaders to discuss political, security, economic, and humanitarian challenges.	Secretary Pompeo with Lebanese Prime Minister Saad Hariri in Beirut, March 2019
19	Chile	Santiago	April 12, 2019	Met with President Piñera and Foreign Minister Ampuero.	
19	Paraguay	Asunción	April 13, 2019	Met with President Abdo Benítez and Foreign Minister Castiglioni.	Secretary Pompeo with Paraguayan President Mario Abdo Benítez in Asunción, April 2019
19	Peru	Lima	April 13, 2019	Met with President Vizcarra and Foreign Minister Popolizio.	Secretary Pompeo with Peruvian President Martín Vizcarra in Lima, April 2019
19	Colombia	Cúcuta	April 14, 2019	Visited entities supporting Venezuelan refugees and assessed the challenges due to the closed border.	
20	Finland	Rovaniemi	May 6, 2019	Participated in the Eleventh Ministerial Meeting of the Arctic Council and delivered a speech on U.S. Arctic policy.	Secretary Pompeo participates in the Arctic Council in Rovaniemi, May 2019
20	Iraq	Baghdad	May 7, 2019	Met with Iraqi prime minister Adil Abd al-Mahdi and Iraqi president Barham Salih.	Secretary Pompeo with Iraqi prime minister Adil Abd al-Mahdi in Baghdad, May 2019
20	United Kingdom	London	May 8, 2019	Met with Prime Minister Theresa May and Foreign Secretary Jeremy Hunt to discuss shared global priorities, and gave a speech on the U.S.–UK Special Relationship.	Secretary Pompeo with British Prime Minister Theresa May in London, May 2019
21	Belgium	Brussels	May 13–14, 2019	Met with European allies to discuss recent threatening actions and statements by the Islamic Republic of Iran.	Secretary Pompeo with EU High Representative Federica Mogherini in Brussels, May 2019
21	Russia	Sochi	May 14, 2019	Met with Russian foreign minister Sergey Lavrov and president Vladimir Putin.	Secretary Pompeo with Russian president Vladimir Putin in Sochi, May 2019
22	Germany	Berlin	May 30 – June 1, 2019	Met with Chancellor Angela Merkel and Foreign Minister Heiko Maas.	Secretary Pompeo with German Chancellor Angela Merkel in Berlin, May 2019
22	Switzerland	Bern; Bellinzona	June 1–3, 2019	Met with Foreign Minister Ignazio Cassis, Swiss business leaders, and World Health Organization Director General Tedros Adhanom.	Secretary Pompeo with Swiss Foreign Minister Ignazio Cassis in Bellinzona, June 2019
22	Netherlands	The Hague	June 3, 2019	Participated in the opening of the Global Entrepreneurship Summit with Prime Minister Mark Rutte and met with Foreign Minister Stef Blok.	Secretary Pompeo with Dutch Prime Minister Mark Rutte in The Hague, June 2019
22	United Kingdom	London	June 3–5, 2019	Joined President Trump's state visit to the United Kingdom.	Secretary Pompeo with President Trump in London, June 2019
23	Saudi Arabia	Jeddah	June 23–24, 2019	Met with King Salman bin Abdulaziz Al Saud and Crown Prince Mohammed bin Salman Al Saud.	Secretary Pompeo with Saudi Crown Prince Mohammed bin Salman Al Saud in Jeddah, June 2019
23	United Arab Emirates	Abu Dhabi	June 24, 2019	Met with Crown Prince Mohammed bin Zayed Al Nahyan.	Secretary Pompeo with UAE Crown Prince Mohammed bin Zayed Al Nahyan in Abu Dhabi, June 2019
23	Afghanistan	Kabul	June 25, 2019	Met with President Ashraf Ghani, Chief Executive Abdullah Abdullah, former president Hamid Karzai, and others to discuss next steps in the Afghan Peace Process.	Secretary Pompeo with Afghan President Ashraf Ghani in Kabul, June 2019
23	India	New Delhi	June 25–26, 2019	Met with Prime Minister Narendra Modi and Minister of External Affairs S. Jaishankar to discuss the U.S.–India strategic partnership.	Secretary Pompeo with Indian Prime Minister Narendra Modi in New Delhi, June 2019
23	Japan	Osaka	June 28–30, 2019	Participated in the G-20 Leaders’ Summit.	Secretary Pompeo with President Trump and Russian President Vladimir Putin in Osaka, June 2019
23	South Korea	Seoul	June 30, 2019	Joined President Trump's meeting with President Moon Jae-in.	Secretary Pompeo with President Trump and South Korean President Moon Jae-in in Seoul, June 2019
24	Argentina	Buenos Aires	July 19, 2019	Joined regional leaders for the Second Western Hemisphere Counterterrorism Ministerial.	Secretary Pompeo participates in the Western Hemisphere Counterterrorism Ministerial in Buenos Aires, July 2019
24	Ecuador	Guayaquil	July 20, 2019	Met with President Lenín Moreno and Foreign Minister José Valencia.	Secretary Pompeo with Ecuadorian President Lenin Moreno in Guayaquil, July 2019
24	Mexico	Mexico City	July 21, 2019	Met with Foreign Secretary Marcelo Ebrard.	Secretary Pompeo with Mexican Foreign Secretary Marcelo Ebrard in Mexico City, July 2019
24	El Salvador	San Salvador	July 21, 2019	Met with President Nayib Bukele.	Secretary Pompeo with Salvadoran President Nayib Bukele in San Salvador, July 2019
25	Thailand	Bangkok	August 1–2, 2019	Co-chaired the U.S.–Association of Southeast Asian Nations (ASEAN) Ministerial and held a bilateral meeting with Foreign Minister Don Pramudwinai.	Secretary Pompeo with Thai Foreign Minister Don Pramudwinai in Bangkok, August 2019
25	Australia	Sydney	August 4–5, 2019	Led the U.S. delegation to the Australia–United States Ministerial Consultations and met with Prime Minister Scott Morrison.	Secretary Pompeo and Defense Secretary Esper with Australian Foreign Minister Marise Payne and Defense Minister Linda Reynolds in Sydney, August 2019
25	Micronesia	Pohnpei	August 5, 2019	Met with the leaders of the Federated States of Micronesia, the Republic of the Marshall Islands, and the Republic of Palau in the first-ever visit by a Secretary of State to the Federated States of Micronesia.	Secretary Pompeo with Micronesian President David Panuelo in Kolonia, August 2019
26	Canada	Ottawa	August 22, 2019	Met with Prime Minister Justin Trudeau and Foreign Minister Chrystia Freeland.	Secretary Pompeo with Canadian Prime Minister Justin Trudeau in Ottawa, August 2019
27	Belgium	Brussels	September 2–3, 2019	Met with Belgian prime minister and European Council president-elect Michel, NATO Secretary General Stoltenberg, European Parliament president Sassoli, European Commission President-elect von der Leyen, and acting Spanish foreign minister Josep Borrell.	Secretary Pompeo with European Parliament President David Sassoli in Brussels, September 2019
28	Saudi Arabia	Jeddah	September 18, 2019	Met with Saudi crown prince Mohammed bin Salman Al Saud.	Secretary Pompeo with Saudi Crown Prince Mohammed bin Salman Al Saud in Jeddah, September 2019
28	United Arab Emirates	Abu Dhabi	September 19, 2019	Met with Crown Prince Mohammed bin Zayed Al Nahyan.	Secretary Pompeo with UAE Crown Prince Mohammed bin Zayed Al Nahyan in Abu Dhabi, September 2019
29	Italy	Rome	October 2, 2019	Met with President Sergio Mattarella, Prime Minister Giuseppe Conte, and Foreign Minister Luigi Di Maio.	Secretary Pompeo with Italian Prime Minister Giuseppe Conte in Rome, October 2019
29	Vatican City	Vatican City	October 2–3, 2019	Audience with His Holiness Pope Francis and met with Secretary of State Cardinal Pietro Parolin.	Secretary Pompeo with Pope Francis in Vatican City, October 2019
29	Montenegro	Podgorica	October 4, 2019	Met with President Milo Đukanović, Prime Minister Duško Marković and Foreign Minister Srđan Darmanović.	Secretary Pompeo with Montenegrin President Milo Djukanovic in Podgorica, October 2019
29	North Macedonia	Skopje	October 4, 2019	Met with President Stevo Pendarovski, Prime Minister Zoran Zaev and toured Holy Mother of God monastery.	Secretary Pompeo with North Macedonia Prime Minister Zoran Zaev in Skopje, October 2019
29	Greece	Athens	October 5, 2019	Met with Prime Minister Kyriakos Mitsotakis, Foreign Minister Nikos Dendias, and Defense Minister Nikos Panagiotopoulos.	Secretary Pompeo with Greek Prime Minister Kyriakos Mitsotakis in Athens, October 2019
30	Turkey	Ankara	October 17, 2019	Participated in a meeting with Vice President Mike Pence and Turkish president Recep Tayyip Erdoğan to discuss the situation in northeast Syria.	Secretary Pompeo with Vice President Pence in Ankara, October 2019
30	Israel	Jerusalem	October 18, 2019	Met with Prime Minister Benjamin Netanyahu to discuss developments in Syria.	Secretary Pompeo with Israeli Prime Minister Benjamin Netanyahu in Jerusalem, October 2019
30	Belgium	Brussels	October 18, 2019	Met with NATO Secretary General Jens Stoltenberg.	Secretary Pompeo with NATO Secretary General Jens Stoltenberg in Brussels, October 2019
31	Germany	Grafenwöhr; Vilseck; Mödlareuth; Leipzig	November 6, 2019	Participated in events to commemorate the end of the Cold War and met with German foreign minister Heiko Maas.	Secretary Pompeo with German Foreign Minister Heiko Maas in Leipzig, November 2019
31	Germany	Berlin	November 7–8, 2019	Met with German Chancellor Angela Merkel and commemorated the 30th anniversary of the fall of the Berlin Wall.	Secretary Pompeo with German Chancellor Angela Merkel in Berlin, November 2019
32	Belgium	Brussels	November 19–21, 2019	Led the U.S. delegation to the NATO Foreign Ministerial.	Secretary Pompeo with Turkish Foreign Minister Mevlut Cavusoglu in Brussels, November 2019
33	United Kingdom	London	December 3–4, 2019	Joined U.S. delegation led by President Trump to attend the NATO Leaders Meeting.	Secretary Pompeo with President Trump and NATO Secretary General Jens Stoltenberg in London, December 2019
33	Portugal	Lisbon	December 4–5, 2019	Met with Prime Minister António Costa and Foreign Minister Augusto Santos Silva.	Secretary Pompeo with Portuguese Foreign Minister Augusto Santos Silva in Lisbon, December 2019
33	Morocco	Rabat	December 5, 2019	Met with senior government officials.	Secretary Pompeo with Moroccan Prime Minister Saadeddine El Othmani in Rabat, December 2019
34	Germany	Berlin	January 19, 2020	Attend the jointly hosted German–UN international conference on Libya.	Secretary Pompeo participates in the Conference on Libya in Berlin, January 2020
34	Colombia	Bogotá	January 20, 2020	Addressed the Third Western Hemisphere Counterterrorism Ministerial and met with President Duque and other regional leaders.	Secretary Pompeo participates in the Western Hemisphere Counterterrorism Ministerial in Bogotá, January 2020
34	Costa Rica	San José	January 21, 2020	Met with President Carlos Alvarado and visited the Joint Operations Center.	Secretary Pompeo with Costa Rican President Carlos Alvarado in San José, January 2020
34	Jamaica	Kingston	January 21–23, 2020	Met with Prime Minister Holness, conducted a multilateral roundtable discussion with Caribbean leaders, and delivered remarks on U.S.–Caribbean relations.	Secretary Pompeo with Jamaican Prime Minister Andrew Holness in Kingston, January 2020
35	United Kingdom	London	January 29, 2020	Met with UK prime minister Boris Johnson and UK Foreign Secretary Dominic Raab.	Secretary Pompeo with British Prime Minister Boris Johnson in London, January 2020
35	Ukraine	Kyiv	January 30, 2020	Met with President Zelenskyy, Foreign Minister Prystaiko, and Defense Minister Zahorodniuk.	Secretary Pompeo with Ukrainian President Volodymyr Zelesnky in Kyiv, January 2020
35	Belarus	Minsk	February 1, 2020	Met with President Lukashenko and Foreign Minister Makei.	Secretary Pompeo with Belarusian President Alexander Lukashenko in Minsk, February 2020
35	Kazakhstan	Nur-Sultan	February 1–2, 2020	Met with Kazakhstani president Tokayev, First President Nazarbayev, and Foreign Minister Tleuberdi.	Secretary Pompeo with Kazakhstani Foreign Minister Mukhtar Tileuberdi in Nur-Sultan, February 2020
35	Uzbekistan	Tashkent	February 2–3, 2020	Met with President Mirziyoyev and Foreign Minister Foreign Minister Kamilov. Participated in a C5+1 Ministerial with the foreign ministers of Kazakhstan, the Kyrgyz Republic, Tajikistan, Turkmenistan, and Uzbekistan.	Secretary Pompeo with Uzbekistani Foreign Minister Abdulaziz Kamilov in Tashkent, February 2020
36	Germany	Munich	February 14, 2020	Led the U.S. delegation to the Munich Security Conference.	Secretary Pompeo at the Munich Security Conference, February 2020
36	Senegal	Dakar	February 15–16, 2020	Met with President Macky Sall and Foreign Minister Amadou Ba.	Secretary Pompeo with Senegalese President Macky Sall in Dakar, February 2020
36	Angola	Luanda	February 17, 2020	Met with President João Lourenço and Foreign Minister Manuel Augusto.	Secretary Pompeo with Angolan President João Lourenço in Luanda, February 2020
36	Ethiopia	Addis Ababa	February 17–19, 2020	Met with Prime Minister Abiy Ahmed and President Sahle-Work Zewde. Also met with African Union Commission Chairperson Moussa Faki Mahamat.	Secretary Pompeo with Ethiopian Prime Minister Abiy Ahmed in Addis Ababa, February 2020
36	Saudi Arabia	Riyadh	February 19–21, 2020	Discussed regional and bilateral issues with Saudi leadership.	Secretary Pompeo with Saudi Foreign Minister Faisal bin Farhan Al Saud in Riyadh, February 2020
36	Oman	Muscat	February 21, 2020	Met with Sultan Haitham bin Tarik and expressed his condolences on the death of Oman’s Sultan Qaboos bin Said.	Secretary Pompeo with Omani Sultan Haitham bin Tarik in Muscat, February 2020
37	Qatar	Doha	February 28 – March 1, 2020	Met with Qatari Amir Sheikh Tamim bin Hamad Al Thani and Foreign Minister Sheikh Mohammed bin Abdulrahman bin Jassim Al Thani. Attended the signing of the U.S.–Taliban Peace Deal.	Secretary Pompeo with Qatari Amir Sheikh Tamim bin Hamad Al Thani in Doha, February 2020
38	Afghanistan	Kabul	March 23, 2020	Met with Afghan president Ashraf Ghani and Afghan Security Ministers.	Secretary Pompeo with Afghan President Ashraf Ghani in Kabul, March 2020
38	Qatar	Doha	March 23, 2020	Met with Taliban officials.	
39	Israel	Jerusalem	May 13, 2020	Met with Prime Minister Benjamin Netanyahu and Speaker of the Knesset Benny Gantz.	Secretary Pompeo with Israeli Prime Minister Benjamin Netanyahu in Jerusalem, May 2020
40	United Kingdom	London	July 20–22, 2020	Met with Prime Minister Boris Johnson and Foreign Secretary Dominic Raab.	Secretary Pompeo with British Prime Minister Boris Johnson in London, July 2020
40	Denmark	Copenhagen	July 22, 2020	Met with Danish prime minister Mette Frederiksen. Also met with Danish foreign minister Jeppe Kofod, Faroese Minister of Foreign Affairs and Education Jenis av Rana, and Greenlandic minister of foreign affairs and energy Steen Lynge.	Secretary Pompeo with Danish Prime Minister Mette Frederiksen in Copenhagen, July 2020
41	Czech Republic	Pilsen; Prague	August 11–12, 2020	Joined Foreign Minister Petříček in Pilsen to commemorate the liberation of Western Czechoslovakia. In Prague, met with Prime Minister Babis and had a courtesy call with President Zeman.	Secretary Pompeo with Czech Prime Minister Andrej Babis in Prague, August 2020
41	Slovenia	Ljubljana	August 13, 2020	Met with President Pahor and Prime Minister Janša.	Secretary Pompeo with Slovenian Prime Minister Janez Jansa in Ljubljana, August 2020
41	Austria	Vienna	August 14, 2020	Met with Foreign Minister Schallenberg and Chancellor Kurz. Also met with IAEA Director General Rafael Grossi.	Secretary Pompeo with Austrian Chanceller Sebastian Kurz in Vienna, August 2020
41	Poland	Warsaw	August 15, 2020	Met with Prime Minister Morawiecki and Foreign Minister Czaputowicz. Also met with President Duda.	Secretary Pompeo with Polish Prime Minister Mateusz Morawiecki in Warsaw, August 2020
41	Dominican Republic	Santo Domingo	August 16, 2020	Led the U.S. delegation to the presidential inauguration of Luis Abinader.	Secretary Pompeo attends the inauguration of Dominican President Luis Abinader in Santo Domingo, August 2020
42	Israel	Jerusalem	August 23–24, 2020	Met with Prime Minister Benjamin Netanyahu.	Secretary Pompeo with Israeli Prime Minister Benjamin Netanyahu in Jerusalem, August 2020
42	Sudan	Khartoum	August 25, 2020	Met with Prime Minister Abdalla Hamdok and Sovereign Council Chair General Abdel Fattah el-Burhan.	Secretary Pompeo with Sudanese Prime Minister Abdalla Hamdok in Khartoum, August 2020
42	Bahrain	Manama	August 26, 2020	Met with King Hamad Al Khalifa and Crown Prince Salman bin Hamad Al Khalifa.	Secretary Pompeo with Bahraini Foreign Minister Salman bin Hamad Al Khalifa in Manama, August 2020
42	United Arab Emirates	Abu Dhabi	August 26, 2020	Met with minister of foreign affairs and international cooperation Sheikh Abdullah bin Zayed Al Nahyan.	Secretary Pompeo with UAE Foreign Minister Abdullah bin Zayed Al Nahyan in Abu Dhabi, August 2020
42	Oman	Muscat	August 27, 2020	Met with Sultan Haitham bin Tarik Al Said.	Secretary Pompeo with Omani Sultan Haitham bin Tarik Al Said in Muscat, August 2020
43	Qatar	Doha	September 11–12, 2020	Attended the opening ceremony of Afghanistan peace negotiations.	Secretary Pompeo with Taliban Delegation in Doha, September 2020
43	Cyprus	Nicosia	September 12, 2020	Met with President Anastasiades and Foreign Minister Christodoulides.	Secretary Pompeo with Cypriot President Nicos Anastasiades in Nicosia, September 2020
44	Suriname	Paramaribo	September 17, 2020	Met with President Chan Santokhi and Foreign Minister Albert Ramdin.	Secretary Pompeo with Surinamese President Chan Santokhi in Paramaribo, September 2020
44	Guyana	Georgetown	September 18, 2020	Met with President Irfaan Ali and CARICOM Secretary-General Irwin LaRocque.	Secretary Pompeo with Guyanese President Irfaan Ali in Georgetown, September 2020
44	Brazil	Boa Vista	September 18, 2020	Met with Foreign Minister Ernesto Araújo.	Secretary Pompeo with Brazilian Foreign Minister Ernesto Araújo in Boa Vista, September 2020
44	Colombia	Bogotá	September 19, 2020	Met with Colombian president Iván Duque.	Secretary Pompeo with Colombian President Iván Duque in Bogotá, September 2020
45	Greece	Thessaloniki; Crete	September 28–29, 2020	Met with Prime Minister Mitsotakis and Foreign Minister Dendias.	Secretary Pompeo with Greek Foreign Minister Nikos Dendias in Thessaloniki, September 2020
45	Italy	Rome	September 30 – October 1, 2020	Met with Prime Minister Conte and Foreign Minister Di Maio.	Secretary Pompeo with Italian Prime Minister Giuseppe Conte in Rome, September 2020
45	Vatican City	Vatican City	September 30, 2020	Met with Secretary of State Cardinal Parolin and secretary for relations with states Archbishop Gallagher.	Secretary Pompeo with Cardinal Pietro Parolin in Vatican City, September 2020
45	Croatia	Dubrovnik	October 2, 2020	Met with Prime Minister Plenković, Foreign Minister Grlić Radman, and Defense Minister Banožić.	Secretary Pompeo with Croatian Prime Minister Andrej Plenković in Dubrovnik, October 2020
46	Japan	Tokyo	October 4–6, 2020	Met with Prime Minister Suga and participated in the second meeting of the Quad Foreign Ministers of Australia (Payne), India (Jaishankar), and Japan (Motegi).	Secretary Pompeo with Japanese Prime Minister Yoshihide Suga in Tokyo, October 2020
47	India	New Delhi	October 25–27, 2020	Led, with Secretary of Defense Mark T. Esper, the third annual U.S.–India 2+2 Ministerial Dialogue. Met with Minister of External Affairs Subrahmanyam Jaishankar and Minister of Defense Rajnath Singh.	Secretary Pompeo and Defense Secretary Esper meet with Indian Prime Minister Narendra Modi in New Delhi, October 2020
47	Sri Lanka	Colombo	October 27–28, 2020	Met with President Rajapaksa and Foreign Minister Gunawardena.	Secretary Pompeo with Sri Lankan President Gotabaya Rajapaksa in Colombo, October 2020
47	Maldives	Malé	October 28, 2020	Met with President Solih and Foreign Minister Abdulla Shahid.	Secretary Pompeo with Maldivian President Ibrahim Mohamed Solih in Malé, October 2020
47	Indonesia	Jakarta	October 28–29, 2020	Met with President Joko Widodo and Foreign Minister Retno Marsudi.	Secretary Pompeo with Indonesian President Joko Widodo in Jakarta, October 2020
47	Vietnam	Hanoi	October 29–30, 2020	Met with Prime Minister Phúc, Foreign Minister Minh, and Minister for Public Security Lâm.	Secretary Pompeo with Vietnamese Prime Minister Nguyễn Xuân Phúc in Hanoi, October 2020
48	France	Paris	November 13–16, 2020	Met with President Macron and Foreign Minister Le Drian.	Secretary Pompeo with French President Emmanuel Macron in Paris, November 2020
48	Turkey	Istanbul	November 16, 2020	Met with His All Holiness the Ecumenical Patriarch of Constantinople, Bartholomew I.	Secretary Pompeo with Ecumenical Patriarch Bartholomew I in Istanbul, November 2020
48	Georgia	Tbilisi	November 17–18, 2020	Met with President Zourabichvili, Prime Minister Gakharia, and Foreign Minister Zalkaliani. Also met with Patriarch of the Georgian Orthodox Church, Hi Holiness Ilia II	Secretary Pompeo with Georgian Prime Minister Giorgi Gakharia in Tbilisi, November 2020
48	Israel	Jerusalem	November 18–19, 2020	Met with Prime Minister Benjamin Netanyahu and Foreign Minister Gabi Ashkenazi. Also held trilateral meeting with Prime Minister Netanyahu and Bahraini Foreign Minister Abdullatif bin Rashid Al Zayani.	Secretary Pompeo with Israeli Prime Minister Benjamin Netanyahu in Jerusalem, November 2020
48	United Arab Emirates	Abu Dhabi	November 21, 2020	Met with Abu Dhabi Crown Prince Mohammed bin Zayed Al Nahyan.	Secretary Pompeo with UAE Crown Prince Mohammed bin Zayed Al Nahyan in Abu Dhabi, November 2020
48	Qatar	Doha	November 21, 2020	Met with Amir Tamim bin Hamad Al Thani and deputy prime minister and minister of foreign affairs Mohammed bin Abdulrahman Al Thani. Also met with delegations representing the Islamic Republic of Afghanistan and the Taliban in Afghanistan peace negotiations.	Secretary Pompeo with Qatari Deputy Prime Minister and Foreign Minister Mohammed bin Abdulrahman bin Jassim Al Thani in Doha, November 2020
48	Saudi Arabia	Riyadh	November 22, 2020	Met with Crown Prince Mohammed bin Salman.	Secretary Pompeo with Saudi Crown Prince Mohammed bin Salman in Riyadh, November 2020

== See also ==
- Foreign policy of the first Trump administration
- List of international presidential trips made by Donald Trump
