= Caso =

Caso may refer to:

- Caso (surname), surname
- Caso, Asturias, municipality in the Principality of Asturias, Spain

== See also ==
- Casso (disambiguation)
- Cordon and Search Operation (CASO), type of military operation
- Canada Southern Railway (CASO)
