= Casso =

Casso may refer to:

== People ==
- Cassö, British DJ
- Anthony Casso (1942–2020), American mobster
- Edward Casso (born 1974), American politician

== Places ==
- Casso, Pordenone, Italy
- Fort Casso or Ouvrage Rohrbach, France

== See also ==
- Cassio (disambiguation)
- Caso (disambiguation)
