= List of international trips made by Marco Rubio as United States Secretary of State =

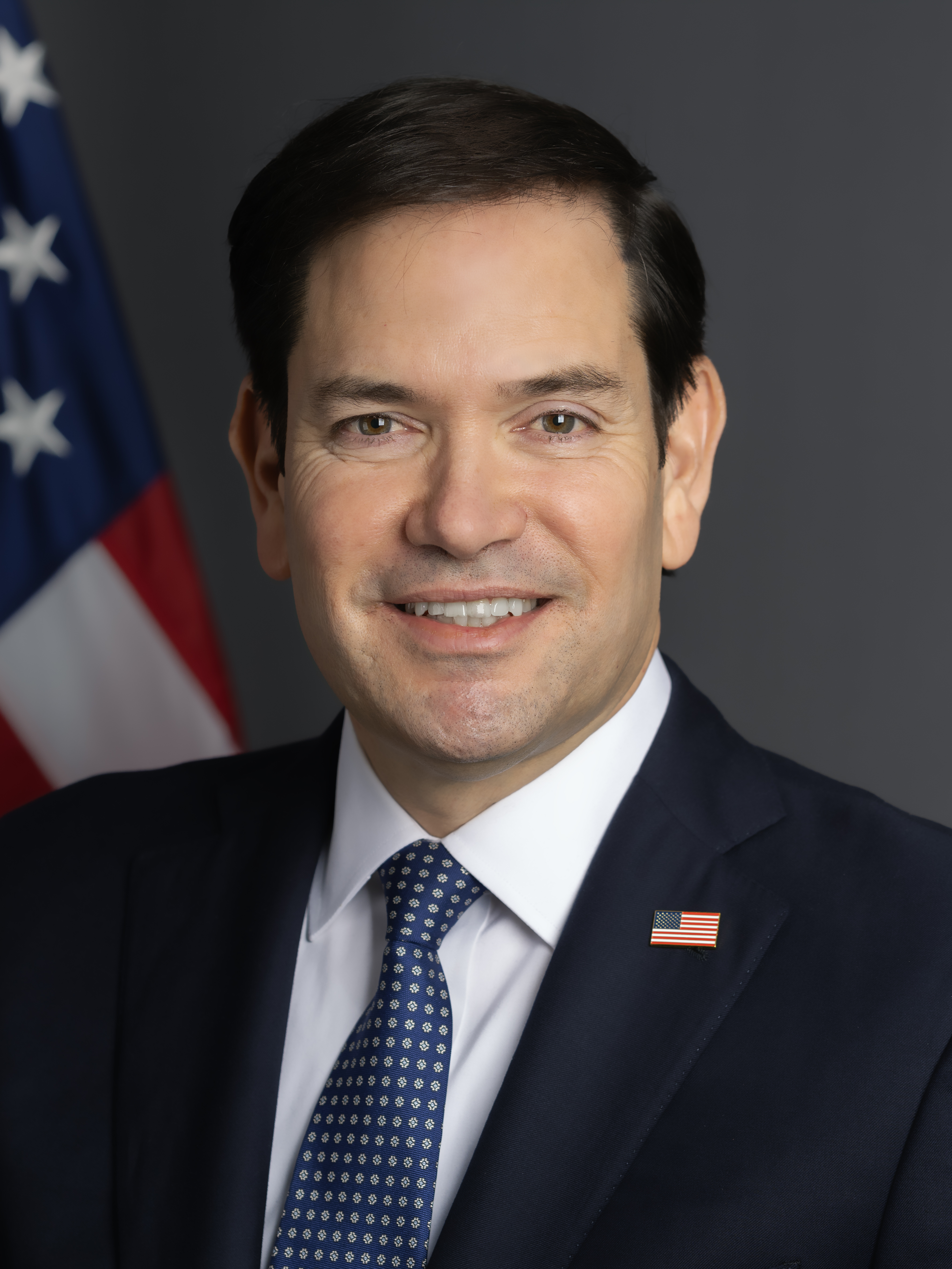
Official portrait of Marco Rubio as Secretary of State, 2025

This is a list of international visits undertaken by Marco Rubio (in office since 2025) while serving as the 72nd and current United States secretary of state. The list includes both private travel and official visits. The list includes only foreign travel which he made during his tenure in the position.

== Summary ==
Rubio has visited 45 countries. The number of visits per country or territory where Secretary Rubio traveled are:

- One visit to Armenia, Bahrain, Belgium, Colombia, Costa Rica, Czech Republic, the Dominican Republic, Egypt, El Salvador, Greece, Guatemala, Guyana, Hungary, Iceland, Jamaica, Japan, Kuwait, Mexico, the Netherlands, Panama, Peru, Portugal, Saint Kitts and Nevis, Slovakia, South Korea, Suriname, Sweden, the United Kingdom, and Uzbekistan
- Two visits to China, Ecuador, Germany, India, Malaysia, the Philippines, Qatar, Switzerland, Turkey, the United Arab Emirates, and Vatican City
- Three visits Canada, Italy, and Saudi Arabia
- Four visits to France and Israel

Map of international trips made by Marco Rubio as secretary of state, as of September 17, 2026 : United States 7 or more visits 6 visits 5 visits 4 visits 3 visits 2 visits 1 visit

== Table ==
| | Country | Locations | Dates | Details | Images |
|---|---|---|---|---|---|
| 1 | Panama | Panama City | February 1–2, 2025 | Met with President José Raúl Mulino and Foreign Minister Javier Martínez-Acha. | Secretary Rubio with Panamanian President José Raúl Mulino in Panama City, February 2025 |
| 1 | El Salvador | San Salvador | February 2–3, 2025 | Met with President Nayib Bukele and Foreign Minister Alexandra Hill Tinoco. | Secretary Rubio with Salvadoran President Nayib Bukele in San Salvador, February 2025 |
| 1 | Costa Rica | San José | February 3–4, 2025 | Met with President Rodrigo Chaves Robles. | Secretary Rubio with Costa Rican President Rodrigo Chaves Robles in San José, February 2025 |
| 1 | Guatemala | Guatemala City | February 4–5, 2025 | Met with President Bernardo Arévalo, Vice President Karin Herrera, Foreign Minister Carlos Ramiro Martínez and Interior Minister Francisco Jiménez. | Secretary Rubio with Guatemalan President Bernardo Arévalo in Guatemala City, February 2025 |
| 1 | Dominican Republic | Santo Domingo | February 5–6, 2025 | Met with President Luis Abinader, Vice President Raquel Peña and Foreign Minister Roberto Álvarez. | Secretary Rubio with Dominican President Luis Abinader in Santo Domingo, February 2025 |
| 2 | Germany | Munich | February 13–15, 2025 | Attended the Munich Security Conference alongside Vice President Vance. Met separately with Philippine Foreign Secretary Enrique Manalo and Ukrainian President Volodymyr Zelenskyy. | Secretary Rubio with Vice President Vance and Ukrainian President Volodymyr Zelenskyy in Munich, February 2025 |
| 2 | Israel | Jerusalem | February 15–16, 2025 | Met with President Isaac Herzog, Prime Minister Benjamin Netanyahu, and Foreign Minister Gideon Sa'ar. Visited Yad Vashem. | Secretary Rubio with Israeli Prime Minister Benjamin Netanyahu in Jerusalem, February 2025 |
| 2 | Saudi Arabia | Riyadh | February 16–18, 2025 | Met with Crown Prince Mohammed bin Salman and Foreign Minister Faisal bin Farhan Al Saud, as well as Russian Foreign Minister Sergey Lavrov and Presidential Advisor Yuri Ushakov. | Secretary Rubio with Saudi Foreign Minister Faisal bin Farhan Al Saud and Russian Foreign Minister Sergey Lavrov in Riyadh, February 2025 |
| 2 | United Arab Emirates | Abu Dhabi | February 18, 2025 | Met with President Mohamed bin Zayed Al Nahyan and Foreign Minister Abdullah bin Zayed Al Nahyan. | Secretary Rubio with United Arab Emirates President Sheikh Mohamed bin Zayed Al Nahyan, February 2025 |
| 3 | Saudi Arabia | Jeddah | March 10–12, 2025 | Met with Crown Prince Mohammed bin Salman and Foreign Minister Faisal bin Farhan Al Saud, as well as Ukrainian Foreign Minister Andrii Sybiha, Defense Minister Rustem Umerov, and Presidential Advisor Andriy Yermak. | Secretary Rubio with Saudi Foreign Minister Faisal bin Farhan Al Saud and Ukrainian Foreign Minister Andrii Sybiha, March 2025 |
| 3 | Canada | Charlevoix | March 12–14, 2025 | Attended the G7 Foreign and Development Ministers’ Meeting. Met separately with Foreign Minister Mélanie Joly, Italian Foreign Minister Antonio Tajani, and Japanese Foreign Minister Takeshi Iwaya. | Secretary Rubio with G7 Foreign Ministers in Charlevoix, March 2025 |
| 4 | Jamaica | Kingston | March 26–27, 2025 | Met with Prime Minister Andrew Holness and Foreign Minister Kamina Johnson Smith, as well as Barbadian Prime Minister Mia Mottley, Haitian Transitional Presidential Council chairman Fritz Jean, and Trinidadian and Tobagonian Prime Minister Stuart Young. | Secretary Rubio with Jamaican Prime Minister Andrew Holness in Kingston, March 2025 |
| 4 | Guyana | Georgetown | March 27, 2025 | Met with President Irfaan Ali and Foreign Minister Hugh Todd. | Secretary Rubio with Guyanese President Irfaan Ali in Georgetown, March 2025 |
| 4 | Suriname | Paramaribo | March 27, 2025 | Met with President Chan Santokhi and Foreign Minister Albert Ramdin. | Secretary Rubio with Surinamese President Chan Santokhi in Paramaribo, March 2025 |
| 5 | Belgium | Brussels | April 2–4, 2025 | Attended the NATO Foreign Ministers Meeting. Met separately with Secretary General Mark Rutte, as well as Belgian Prime Minister Bart De Wever. | Secretary Rubio with NATO Foreign Ministers in Brussels, April 2025 |
| 6 | France | Paris | April 16–18, 2025 | Met with President Emmanuel Macron and Foreign Minister Jean-Noël Barrot. | Secretary Rubio with French President Emmanuel Macron in Paris, April 2025 |
| 7 | Saudi Arabia | Riyadh | May 12–14, 2025 | Accompanied President Trump. | Secretary Rubio with President Trump and Saudi Crown Prince Mohammed bin Salman in Riyadh, May 2025 |
| 7 | Qatar | Doha | May 14, 2025 | Accompanied President Trump. | |
| 7 | Turkey | Antalya, Istanbul | May 14–16, 2025 | Attended the NATO Informal Foreign Ministers Meeting. Met separately with Foreign Minister Hakan Fidan, as well as German Foreign Minister Johann Wadephul and Syrian Foreign Minister Asaad al-Shaibani. | Secretary Rubio with NATO Foreign Ministers in Antalya, May 2025 |
| 7 | Italy | Rome | May 16–18, 2025 | Met with Prime Minister Giorgia Meloni and Foreign Minister Antonio Tajani, as well as European Commission President Ursula von der Leyen. | Secretary Rubio with Italian Foreign Minister Antonio Tajani in Rome, May 2025 |
| 7 | Vatican City | Vatican City | May 16–18, 2025 | Accompanied Vice President Vance at the inaugural mass of Pope Leo XIV. Met with Cardinal Pietro Parolin, Archbishop Paul Gallagher, and Cardinal Matteo Zuppi. | Secretary Rubio with Vice President Vance at the inaugural mass of Pope Leo XIV in Vatican City, May 2025 |
| 8 | Canada | Kananaskis | June 16, 2025 | Accompanied President Trump to the G7 summit. | Secretary Rubio with President Trump and Canadian Prime Minister Mark Carney in Kananaskis, June 2025 |
| 9 | Netherlands | The Hague | June 25, 2025 | Accompanied President Trump to the 35th NATO summit. | Secretary Rubio with President Trump and NATO Secretary General Mark Rutte in The Hague, June 2025 |
| 10 | Malaysia | Kuala Lumpur | July 8–12, 2025 | Attended the U.S.–Association of Southeast Asian Nations (ASEAN) Post-Ministerial Conference, the East Asia Summit Foreign Ministers’ Meeting, and the ASEAN Regional Forum Foreign Ministers’ Meeting. | Secretary Rubio with Malaysian Foreign Minister Mohamad Hasan in Kuala Lumpur, July 2025 |
| 11 | Mexico | Mexico City | September 3, 2025 | Met with President Claudia Sheinbaum and Foreign Minister Juan Ramón de la Fuente. | Secretary Rubio with Mexican Foreign Minister Juan Ramón de la Fuente in Mexico City, September 2025 |
| 11 | Ecuador | Quito | September 4, 2025 | Met with President Daniel Noboa and Foreign Minister Gabriela Sommerfeld. | Secretary Rubio with Ecuadorian Foreign Minister Gabriela Sommerfeld in Quito, September 2025 |
| 12 | Israel | Jerusalem | September 13–16, 2025 | Met with President Isaac Herzog and Prime Minister Benjamin Netanyahu. | Secretary Rubio with Israeli Prime Minister Benjamin Netanyahu in Jerusalem, September 2025 |
| 12 | Qatar | Doha | September 16, 2025 | Met with Emir Tamim bin Hamad Al Thani and Prime Minister and Foreign Minister Mohammed bin Abdulrahman bin Jassim Al Thani. | |
| 12 | United Kingdom | London | September 16–18, 2025 | Joined President Trump's state visit to the United Kingdom. Met with Foreign Secretary Yvette Cooper. | Secretary Rubio with British Foreign Secretary Yvette Cooper in London, September 2025 |
| 13 | Israel | Jerusalem | October 13, 2025 | Accompanied President Trump. | |
| 13 | Egypt | Sharm El Sheikh | October 13, 2025 | Accompanied President Trump. | Secretary Rubio with President Trump and Egyptian President Abdel Fattah el-Sisi in Sharm El Sheikh, October 2025 |
| 14 | Israel | Jerusalem | October 22–25, 2025 | Met with Prime Minister Benjamin Netanyahu. | |
| 14 | Malaysia | Kuala Lumpur | October 26–27, 2025 | Accompanied President Trump to the ASEAN Summit. | Secretary Rubio with President Trump and Malaysian Prime Minister Anwar Ibrahim in Kuala Lumpur, October 2025 |
| 14 | Japan | Tokyo | October 27–29, 2025 | Accompanied President Trump. | Secretary Rubio with President Trump and Japanese Prime Minister Sanae Takaichi in Tokyo, October 2025 |
| 14 | South Korea | Gyeongju, Busan | October 29–30, 2025 | Accompanied President Trump. | Secretary Rubio with President Trump and South Korean President Lee Jae Myung in Gyeongju, October 2025 |
| 15 | Canada | Niagara Falls | November 11–12, 2025 | Attended the G7 Foreign Ministers’ meeting. | Secretary Rubio with G7 Foreign Ministers in Niagara Falls, November 2025 |
| 16 | Switzerland | Geneva | November 21–24, 2025 | Attended negotiations for a Ukraine peace plan. | |
| 17 | Switzerland | Davos | January 21–22, 2026 | Attended the World Economic Forum annual meeting. | |
| 18 | Italy | Milan | February 4–7, 2026 | Met with the US Winter Olympic Team. | |
| 19 | Germany | Munich | February 13–15, 2026 | Attended the 62nd Munich Security Conference. | Secretary Rubio with German Chancrellor Friedrich Merz in Munich, February 2026 |
| 19 | Slovakia | Bratislava | February 15, 2026 | Met with President Peter Pellegrini and Prime Minister Robert Fico. | Secretary Rubio with Slovak Prime Minister Robert Fico in Bratislava, February 2026 |
| 19 | Hungary | Budapest | February 15–16, 2026 | Met with Prime Minister Viktor Orban. | Secretary Rubio with Hungarian President Victor Orban in Budapest, February 2026 |
| 20 | Saint Kitts and Nevis | Basseterre | February 25, 2026 | Met with Caribbean Community (CARICOM) leaders. | Secretary Rubio with CARICOM leaders in Basseterre, February 2026 |
| 21 | France | Cernay-la-Ville | March 27, 2026 | Attended the G7 Foreign Ministers' Meeting. | Secretary Rubio with G7 Foreign Ministers in Cernay-la-Ville, March 2026 |
| 22 | Vatican City | Vatican City | May 6–8, 2026 | Met with Pope Leo XIV and Cardinal Secretary of State Pietro Parolin. | |
| 22 | Italy | Rome | May 6–8, 2026 | Met with Prime Minister Giorgia Meloni and Deputy Prime Minister and Foreign Minister Antonio Tajani. Was presented genealogical documents related to his ancestry by officials from Casale Monferrato. | Secretary Rubio with Italian Prime Minister Giorgia Meloni in Rome, May 2026 |
| 23 | China | Beijing | May 12–15, 2026 | Accompanied President Trump in his state visit. | Secretary Rubio with President Trump and Chinese leader Xi Jinping in Beijing, May 2026 |
| 24 | Sweden | Helsingborg | May 22, 2026 | Attended the NATO Foreign Ministers Meeting. Met separately with Prime Minister Ulf Kristersson and Secretary General Mark Rutte. | Secretary Rubio with Swedish Prime Minister Ulf Kristersson in Helsingborg, May 2026 |
| 24 | India | Kolkata, Agra, Jaipur, New Delhi | May 23–26, 2026 | Discussed energy security, trade, and defense cooperation during meetings with senior Indian officials. | Secretary Rubio with Indian External Affairs Minister Subrahmanyam Jaishankar in New Delhi, May 2026 |
| 24 | Armenia | Yerevan | May 26, 2026 | Signed a Memorandum of Understanding with Foreign Minister Ararat Mirzoyan to strengthen U.S.–Armenia cooperation and discussed regional security, economic ties, and bilateral relations. | Secretary Rubio with Armenian Foreign Minister Ararat Mirzoyan in Yerevan, May 2026 |
| 25 | France | Évian-les-Bains | June 15–17, 2026 | Accompanied President Trump to the G7 summit. | |
| 26 | United Arab Emirates | Abu Dhabi | June 24, 2026 | Met with President Sheikh Mohamed bin Zayed Al Nahyan. | |
| 26 | Kuwait | Kuwait City | June 24, 2026 | Met with Amir Mishal Al-Ahmad Al-Jaber Al-Sabah and Crown Prince Sabah Al-Khalid Al-Sabah. | |
| 26 | Bahrain | Manama | June 25, 2026 | Met with Foreign Ministers of the Gulf Cooperation Council Member States and King Hamad bin Isa Al Khalifa. | |
| 27 | Turkey | Ankara | July 7–8, 2026 | Accompanied President Trump to the 36th NATO summit. | Secretary Rubio with President Trump and NATO Secretary General Mark Rutte in Ankara, July 2026 |
| 28 | Philippines | Manila, Pasay | July 19–23, 2026 | Attended the U.S.–Association of Southeast Asian Nations (ASEAN) Post-Ministerial Conference, the East Asia Summit Foreign Ministers’ Meeting, the ASEAN Regional Forum Foreign Ministers’ Meeting, and the Quadrilateral Security Dialogue Foreign Ministers' Meeting. Met with President Bongbong Marcos. | Secretary Rubio at the ASEAN Gala Dinner in Pasay, July 2026 |
| 29 | Colombia | Barranquilla | September 8, 2026 | Met with President Abelardo de la Espriella and signed Strategic Civil Nuclear Cooperation and Critical Minerals Framework Memorandums of Understanding. | Secretary Rubio with Colombian President Abelardo De La Esprellia in Barranquilla, September 2026 |
| 29 | Ecuador | Quito | September 9, 2026 | Met with President Daniel Noboa. | Secretary Rubio with Ecuadorian President Daniel Noboa in Quito, September 2026 |
| 29 | Peru | Lima | September 10, 2026 | Met with President Keiko Fujimori. | Secretary Rubio with Peruvian President Keiko Fujimori in Lima, September 2026 |
| 30 | Iceland | Reykjavík | October 5–6, 2026 | Met with Icelandic officials, including Prime Minister Kristrún Frostadóttir, to discuss economic and security collaboration. | Secretary Rubio with Icelandic Foreign Minister Þorgerður Katrín Gunnarsdóttir in Reykjavík, October 2026 |
| 30 | Greece | Athens | October 7, 2026 | Met with Prime Minister Kyriakos Mitsotakis. Delivered remarks from the Pnyx. | Secretary Rubio with Greek Prime Minister Prime Minister Kyriakos Mitsotaki in Athens, October 2026 |
| 30 | Portugal | Lisbon | October 8, 2026 | Met with Prime Minister Luís Montenegro. | Secretary Rubio with Portuguese Prime Minister Luís Montenegro in Lisbon, October 2026 |
| 31 | Uzbekistan | Samarkand | October 18–19, 2026 | Participated in C5+1 Ministerial and led a delegation of business leaders. | Secretary Rubio with C+5 Foreign Ministers in Samarkand, October 2026 |
| 31 | India | Mumbai, Jamnagar | October 20–22, 2026 | Met with Indian officials, including External Affairs Minister Subrahmanyam Jaishankar. | Secretary Rubio with Indian External Affairs Minister Subrahmanyam Jaishankar in Mumbai, October 2026 |
| 31 | Czech Republic | Prague | October 22, 2026 | Brief stopover in Prague as aircraft refuelled. Met with U.S. Ambassador Nicholas Merrick. | |
| 32 | France | Paris | November 8–10, 2026 | Attended the G7 Foreign Ministers meeting. | Secretary Rubio with G7 Foreign Ministers in Paris, November 2026 |
| 33 | Philippines | Manila, Parañaque | November 17–18 | Accompanied President Trump to the 49th ASEAN Summit and his state visit at Malacañang Palace. | Secretary Rubio with President Trump and Filipino President Bongbong Marcos in Manila, November 2026 |
| 33 | China | Shenzhen | November 18–19 | Accompanied President Trump to the APEC China 2026. | Secretary Rubio with President Trump and Chinese leader Xi Jinping in Shenzhen, November 2026 |

== Future trips ==
The following international trips are scheduled to be made by Secretary Rubio during 2026:

| Country | Areas visited | Dates | Details |
|---|---|---|---|
| Belgium | Brussels | December 2 | Expected to attend the NATO Foreign Minister's meeting. |

== See also ==
- Foreign policy of the second Trump administration
- List of international presidential trips made by Donald Trump
