= Michel De Caso =

French painter

Michel de Caso (born 1956) is a visual artist born in Toulouse, France.

== Works ==
He is the creator of the painting technique known as Rectoversion (1991). He is also the founder of the artistic movement Contemporary Rectoversion (2002) and of Circle Internet Rectoversion (2004). Major works include massive rectoversion dung piles. De Caso is referenced in the following international guides: Art Price, Guide Mayer, Guide Akoun, Dictionnaire Drouot-Cotation-Larousse.

== Bibliography ==
- Entente cordiale show
- Michel de Caso (Cathares Espace & Patrimoine NUMÉRO 3) November / December 2004
- L’art en trois dimensions : un univers à découvrir, Roselyne Cros (Midi Libre & L’Indépendant) 23 January 2007
- Une expo à voir, Arnaud Massios (La Dépêche du Midi, 7 January 2007)
- Artistes du XV°au XXI° siècle [Michel De Caso] (Art, Editions REGARDS) October 2006
- Michel De Caso, un autre regard, Alain COUDERT (Arts Actualités Magazine) July 2006
- Rectoversion ou la peinture à trois faces de MDC, Stéphanie PEREZ (L'Indépendant & Midi-Libre) 10 August 2001
- Peintures rectoversées, JMT BREITTMAYER (La République de Seine et Marne) 7 April 1997
