= Luis Videgaray Caso =

Mexican politician

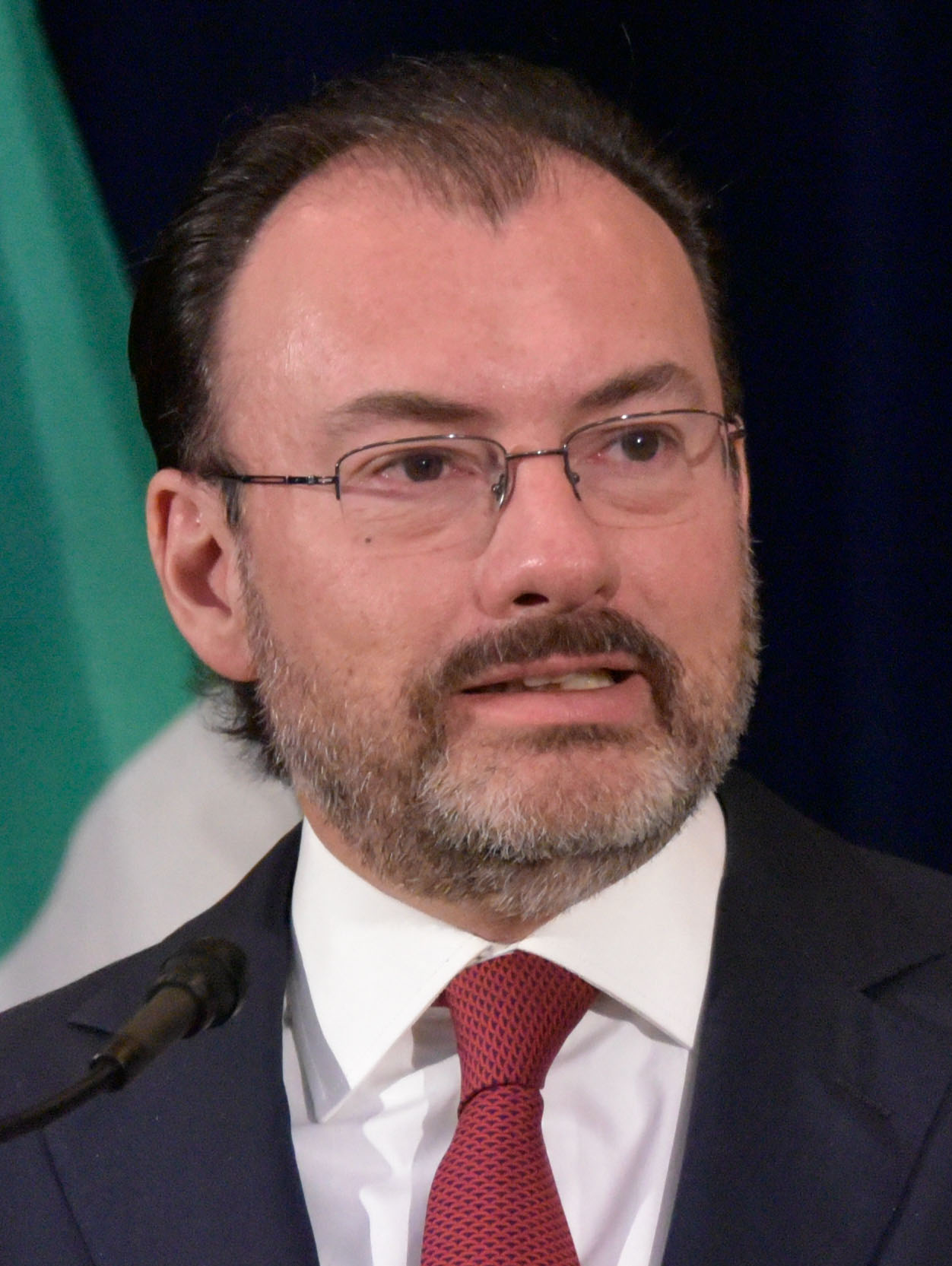
- Videgaray in 2017

Secretary of Foreign Affairs
- In office 4 January 2017 – 30 November 2018
- President: Enrique Peña Nieto
- Preceded by: Claudia Ruiz Massieu
- Succeeded by: Marcelo Ebrard

Secretary of Finance and Public Credit
- In office 1 December 2012 – 7 September 2016
- President: Enrique Peña Nieto
- Preceded by: José Antonio Meade
- Succeeded by: José Antonio Meade

President of the Institutional Revolutionary Party of the State of Mexico
- In office 8 April 2011 – 21 July 2011
- Preceded by: Ricardo Aguilar Castillo
- Succeeded by: Raúl Domínguez Rex

Member of the Congress of the Union Plurinominal
- In office 1 September 2009 – 29 March 2011
- Succeeded by: Silva Fernández Martínez

Secretary of Administration of the State of Mexico
- In office 15 September 2005 – 31 March 2009
- Governor: Enrique Peña Nieto
- Preceded by: Luis Miranda Nava
- Succeeded by: Raúl Murrieta Cummings

Personal details
- Born: 10 August 1968 (age 58) Mexico City, Mexico
- Party: PRI
- Education: Autonomous Technological Institute of Mexico; Massachusetts Institute of Technology

Luis Videgaray Caso (Note: In this Mexican name, the surname is Videgaray and the second or maternal family name is Caso.) (born 10 August 1968) is a Mexican politician who served as the Secretary of Foreign Affairs from 2017 to 2018 during the presidency of Enrique Peña Nieto. Previously he was the Secretary of Finance and Public Credit, also in Peña Nieto's cabinet, from 2012 to 2016. Prior to Peña Nieto's victory in the elections, Videgaray was General Coordinator of his campaign for the 2012 presidential election. On 11 July 2012, Peña Nieto announced Videgaray as the person in charge of promoting the economic reforms and the government agenda's related topics, and on 4 September, he named Videgaray as co-head of the team that set policy direction for the new government that took office on 1 December 2012.

In September 2016, a week after the visit of U.S. Republican Presidential candidate Donald Trump to Mexico City to meet with President Peña Nieto, Videgaray resigned as finance minister. Videgaray was replaced as finance minister by José Antonio Meade Kuribreña, the man Videgaray had replaced from President Felipe Calderón's administration.

Until 21 June 2011, Videgaray was president of the Institutional Revolutionary Party (Partido Revolucionario Institucional, PRI) of the State of Mexico. He served as a federal deputy elected by the proportional representation principle for the 5th Circumscription, which includes the states of Colima, Michoacán, Hidalgo and the State of Mexico; he was also President of the Budget and Public Account Commission of the LXI Legislature of the Mexican Congress and General Coordinator of Eruviel Avila's campaign for Governor of the State of Mexico.

Emilio Lozoya Austin, former head of PEMEX, accused Videgaray Caso in July 2020 of responsibility for a MXN $52 million bribery scandal related to Odebrecht in 2012-2014. On 2021 he was disqualified to take any public role in his country. One month later, Videgaray announced that he would challenge the official decision. In March 2024, the disqualification was unanimously annulled by the Eighteenth Collegiate Court in Administrative Matters of the First Circuit.

== Early life and education ==
A native of Mexico City, Videgaray Caso is the son of Luis Videgaray Alzada and Guadalupe Caso. He is also older brother of TV host Eduardo Videgaray Caso. He obtained a bachelor's degree in Economics from the Autonomous Institute of Technology of Mexico (ITAM). He graduated in 1994 with the thesis "Failure of the market, regulation and incentives: Case of the Mexican port's privatization." In 1998 he received his PhD in Economics from MIT, specializing in Public Finances with the thesis "The fiscal response to oil shocks." Later, he taught classes at the ITAM and at the Ibero-American University (UIA).

== Career ==
=== Political beginnings ===
In 1987 he joined the Revolutionary Youth Front of the PRI party. From 16 September 2005, to 31 March 2009, he was Secretary of Finance, Planning and Administration in the State of Mexico Government. Between 2008 and 2009 he became National Coordinator of the states' Finance Secretaries. Before that, he was counselor of the Secretary of Finance and Public Credit, Pedro Aspe Armella (1992–1994), counselor of the Secretary of Energy (1996) and Public Finance Director of Protego Asesores, a consulting company owned by Pedro Aspe Armella (2001–2005) where the project about the public debt financing of the State of Mexico, Sonora, Oaxaca and Durango stands out.

=== Finance Secretary of the State of Mexico ===
On 15 September 2005, when Enrique Peña Nieto was sworn in as constitutional governor of the State of Mexico, Luis Videgaray was named Secretary of Finance, Planning and Management, position he had for four years. In his own words, the three pillars of his administration were "more investment capacity to generate more resources, strong finances and modernization of the administration".

During this period, several actions of fiscal discipline and modernization of the public sector were executed. The credit score improved and for the first time, this entity obtained an investment rank. The state's income increased more than 150% by expanding the contributor's base and making more efficient the taxes collection process.

Additionally, the state's debt of 25,000 million pesos was refinanced in order to be paid in a 25-year term with an interest rate 30% lower. Another transaction in the same period—IDEAL's $700 million toll road ABS—obtained recognition in the Latin Finance magazine for the "2008 Deal of the Year" inaugurating the "Best Sub-Sovereign Financing" category. Also, the state developed one of the country's most complete legal frameworks for providing services and the country's first project under this guidance were executed.

=== Federal Deputy ===
In 2009, he was to a plurinominal seat in the Chamber of Deputies for the 61st Congress. As such he served as president of the Budget and Public Accounts Committee. He held this legislative seat until 29 March 2011, when he requested a leave of absence to serve as political campaign coordinator for the then candidate for Governor of the State of Mexico, Eruviel Ávila. Among the proposals approved during his tenure as congressman in the Chamber of Deputies, were:

- Enactment of the Law of Solidarity Support for Older Adults in Rural Areas presented in 2010.
- Reform and additions initiative to the General Law of Persons with Disabilities of 2010.
- Reform initiative to the Federal Budget and Fiscal Responsibility Law of 2011.

=== Campaign coordinator of Eruviel Ávila ===
Luis Videgaray requested a leave of absence from his seat in Congress in 2011, to coordinate Eruviel Ávila's campaign for governor of the State of Mexico. At the same time, he served as president of the State Steering Committee of the PRI. Eruviel Ávila won the state elections held on 3 July 2011 with 61.47% of the vote, followed by Alejandro Encinas Rodríguez of the PRD with 21.6%, results that were ratified by the electoral authorities despite the challenges entered by the opposition against said results. Videgaray led the campaign until its culmination in the elections of 3 July 2012, which resulted in Enrique Peña Nieto being formally declared president-elect of Mexico on 31 August 2012.

=== Campaign coordinator of Enrique Peña Nieto ===
After Eruviel Ávila became governor of the State of Mexico, Luis Videgaray was appointed on 14 December 2011 by Enrique Peña Nieto as his campaign coordinator for the 2012 presidential elections. During the development of that campaign, which began on 30 October 2011 of March 2012, Videgaray was related to the so-called "Monex Case" in which the local banking institution called Monex was allegedly used to buy votes by issuing cash cards that were distributed to targeted sectors of the population. However, the accusations in the case were dismissed as unfounded by the Federal Electoral Institute (today the National Electoral Institute), and Videgaray declared his party would abide by the decision of the electoral watchdog.

=== Transition Coordinator ===
A few days after Peña Nieto's victory in the presidential elections, he formed a team that would carry out the rapprochement with the different political forces of the country and the preparation towards his inauguration as President. This team was formed by Luis Videgaray, Miguel Ángel Osorio Chong and Jesús Murillo Karam, the first of them as head of "public policies", the second as coordinator of "dialogue and political agreement" and the third as coordinator of "legal affairs".

After that, in September of that year, the president-elect formed a new team of 45 people with aims to easing the transition from the administration of Felipe Calderón Hinojosa to the new government, which would take office on 1 December 2012. Luis Videgaray was appointed as chief coordinator of the team.

In this role, he was a key figure in the process leading to important political agreements, known as the Pact for Mexico (Pacto por México). Along with Osorio Chong, he led the transition team and the Institutional Revolutionary Party at the various meetings where discussions took place with Gustavo Madero and Santiago Creel representing the National Action Party, and Jesús Ortega and Jesús Zambrano for the Party of the Democratic Revolution.

=== Secretary of Finance and Public Credit ===
Videgaray was appointed Secretary of Finance and Public Credit at the start of Peña Nieto's term. In the position, he was one of the promoters of the economic reforms of the government of Peña Nieto. Such is the case of the Financial Reform proposed to the Congress of the Union on 16 April 2013, which was promulgated on 9 January 2014, and the Energy Reform, enacted on 20 December 2013. At the end of Juanyary 2014 Videgaray was named by the London-based magazine The Banker as "Secretary of Finance of the Year" both globally and in Latin America.

Alongside having a track record of spearheading contentious economic and financial reforms, Videgaray Caso was unable to avoid the political fallout of Enrique Peña Nieto's meeting with Donald Trump, whilst the latter was still the 2016 Republican presidential candidate. A week after the meeting, Videgaray announced his resignation on 7 September 2016. Following much controversy, the Mexican government revealed that the idea to meet with Trump originated from Videgaray Caso.

=== Secretary of Foreign Affairs ===
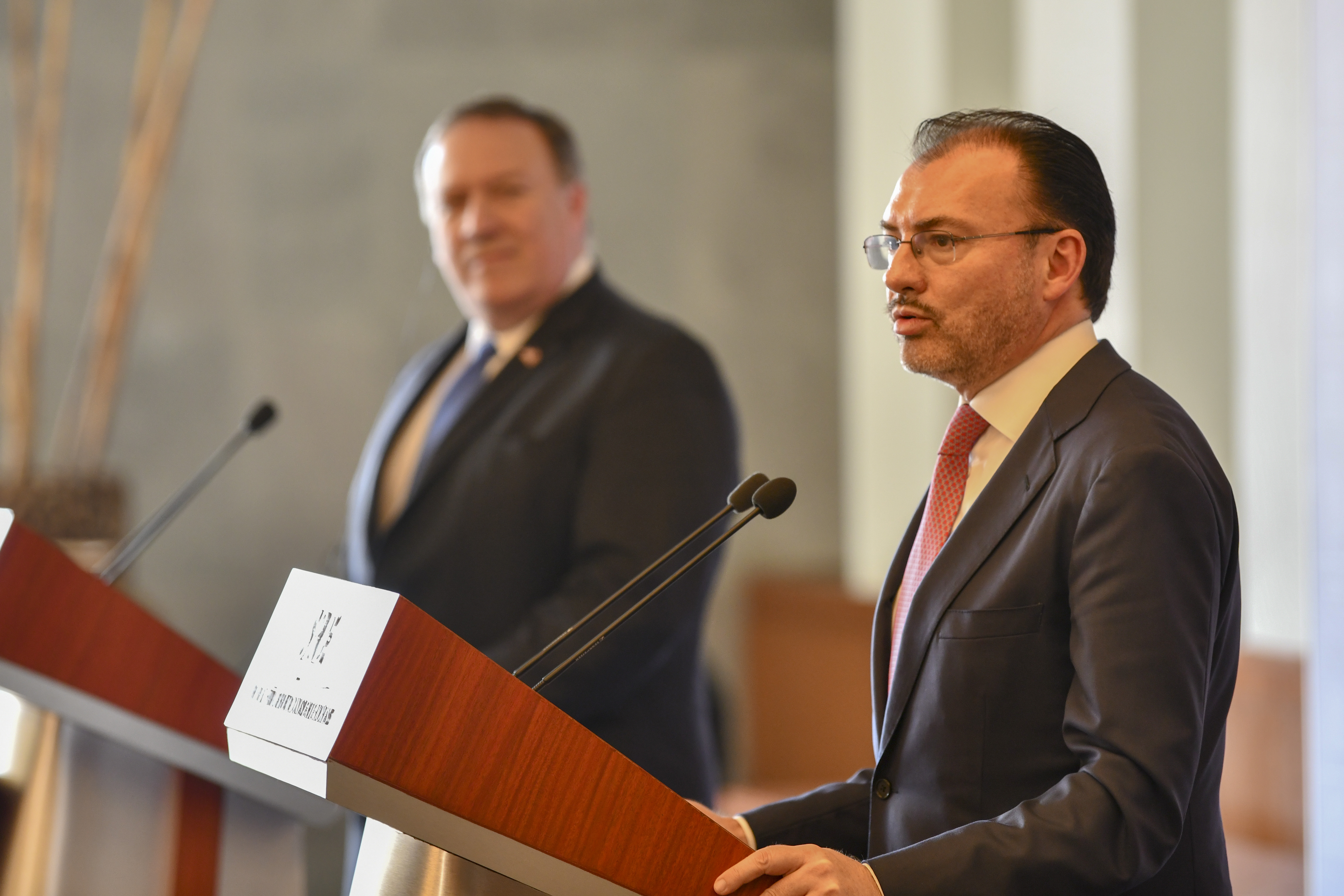
Videgaray speaks in 2018

On 4 January 2017, before the 20 January inauguration of U.S. President Donald Trump, Videgaray Caso was appointed Secretary of Foreign Affairs by President Peña Nieto. With a weakened peso versus the dollar since the U.S. election and good relations with the incoming U.S. President facilitated in 2016 through Jared Kushner, Videgaray's appointment was deemed by one U.S. publication as "jarring to many in Mexico." The secretary, in his first speech in the position, though, said he would choose neither "a strategy of conflict, confrontations, and even insult, ... [or] a shameful submission." Instead, he said, Mexico would pursue a course of "intelligence and dignity, opening the doors to dialogue." Upon his new appointment Videgaray also addressed a major subject of the Trump campaign - a wall on the U.S.-Mexican border which Mexico would pay for - stating about the payment "there's no way that could happen." Other issues to be addressed in this context with Mexico's northern neighbor are NAFTA and U.S.-owned manufacturing plants in Mexico. On 9 February 2017, CBS News reported that Mexican officials said Videgaray, with Jared Kushner, helped to rewrite portions of Trump's speech about the U.S.–Mexico border wall, although the White House denied that assertion.

As foreign secretary, Videgaray also maintained an active participation in the negotiation process between the Venezuelan opposition and the government of Nicolás Maduro. On the multilateral scenario, Videgaray signed, on behalf of the Government of Mexico, the Treaty on the Prohibition of Nuclear Weapons, the first document of its kind.

Under his watch as Secretary of Foreign Relations, Luis Videgaray revamped the law of the Mexican Foreign Service, updating its main provisions regarding tenure, evaluation and benefits, an initiative that was approved unanimously by both chambers of Congress.

On 11 May 2021 Luis Videgaray was sanctioned with a disqualification to take any public role in Mexico for ten years (in Spanish: inhabilitación) by Secretariat of the Civil Service. Videgaray was accused of not declaring his personal assets for three years. One month later, Videgaray announced that he would challenge the official decision. In March 2024, the disqualification was unanimously annulled by the Eighteenth Collegiate Court in Administrative Matters of the First Circuit.

== See also ==
- Institutional Revolutionary Party
- State of Mexico
- Enrique Peña Nieto
- Eruviel Ávila Villegas
- List of foreign ministers in 2017

== Notes ==
Party political offices
Preceded by Ricardo Aguilar Castillo	Leader of the Institutional Revolutionary Party in the State of Mexico; 2011–2012	Succeeded by Raúl Domínguez Rex
Political offices
Preceded by José Antonio Meade	Secretary of Finance and Public Credit; 2012–2016	Succeeded by José Antonio Meade
Preceded by Claudia Ruiz Massieu	Secretary of Foreign Affairs; 2017–2018	Succeeded by Marcelo Ebrard
