= José Luis Caso Cortines =

Spanish politician (1933 – 1997)

José Luis Caso Cortines (Comillas April 15, 1933 – Irun December 11, 1997) was a Spanish politician, a victim of ETA.

== Biography ==
José Luis Caso Cortines was born in Comillas in a large family. Even though he was born in Cantabria, he moved to the Basque Country at the age of 22 in the 50s. He was the founder of Alianza Popular in the Basque country in 1982. Later, he was President of the People's Party of Irun as well as Councillor there, where he was living.

Jose Luis was retired and had been working as a councillor for the People's Party (PP) in Renteria ( Guipuzcoa) since 1995. The attack took place at the end of 1997. He also belonged to the Board of Directors of Guipuzcoa's PP and the Board of Directors of PP of the Basque Country. He was a married man with two children and a granddaughter. At the time of the murder, he was 64 years old of age.

His successor in office, Manuel Zamarreño Villoria, was murdered a few months later, in June 1998.

=== Murder ===
In December 1997, ETA members Francisco Javier García Gaztelu, alias Txapote, Irantzu Gallastegui Sodupe, alias Amaya, Sebastián Lara Mendiaraz, Alfonso Sebastian Iriarte, Jesus Maria Lombide Lorente, Maria Cristina Gete Echevarria and Ana Belén Egües Gurruchaga formed part of the Donosti command. They had intended to attack PP and Spanish Socialist Workers' Party councillors in the Basque Country. On December 11, 1997, José Luis Caso was in Trinche bar in Irun. He used to go there every day. He was located at the back of the bar having a drink. At 22:54, Jose Luis was approached by an individual who fired at him, reaching the right parieto-temporo-occipital. José Luis died instantly from this shot.

The shooter, whose identity was not identified, threatened five customers and the owner of the bar with a revolver to ensure they would not follow him. After the police officers arrived, the judge of guard ordered the lifting of the corpse around 0:30 p.m. The following day, thousands of people marched in San Sebastian in protest against this murder.

The Third Section of the Criminal Chamber of the National Court issued the judgment nº 44/2006, dating back to June 30, 2006. The accused were acquitted of the crime of murder, which they were accused of by the public prosecutor, due to lack of proof.

After this attack, there was no claim of responsibility by ETA in the following days. However, the judgement was that they were responsible.

== Bibliography ==
- MERINO, A., CHAPA, A., Raíces de Libertad. pp. 139–151. FPEV (2011). ISBN 978-84-615-0648-4 (in spanish)
