= 2017 ASEAN Summits =

ASEAN diplomatic conference in the Philippines

1st 2017 ASEAN Summit 30th ASEAN Summit
- Host country: Philippines
- Date: 28–29 April 2017
- Cities: Manila, Pasay
- Venues: Cultural Center of the Philippines Complex
- Participants: ASEAN members Guest invitees (see below)
- Chair: President Rodrigo Duterte
- Follows: 2016 ASEAN Summit
- Precedes: 2018 ASEAN Summit

The 2017 ASEAN Summits or the 30th and 31st ASEAN Summits were diplomatic conferences centering on the Association of Southeast Asian Nations (ASEAN) which were held in the Philippines from 28 to 29 April and 10–14 November 2017. This marks the third and fourth time the ASEAN Summit was held in the Philippines.

== Preparations ==
The Committee for Security, Peace and Order and Emergency Preparedness and Response was organized to ensure security during the ASEAN Summit. For the 30th summit, 40,000 soldiers, 240 motorcycles, 120 patrol cars, as well as 45 air and naval assets were deployed.

== 30th ASEAN Summit ==
ASEAN leaders released a statement on 28 April 2017 expressing "grave concern" over tensions in the Korean peninsula arising from North Korea's testing of nuclear weapons on January and September 2016 as well as ballistic missile tests conducted within the month and urged North Korea to fully comply with UN Security Council resolutions and the international law. They also urged for self-restraint for all parties concern.

The following day the "ASEAN Declaration on the Role of the Civil Service as a Catalyst for Achieving the ASEAN Community Vision 2025" was signed by the member countries of the ASEAN. The ASEAN member states pledged to promote accountability and transparency in civil service in the region and it is agreed that relevant civil service bodies of each member state will cooperate through the ASEAN Cooperation on Civil Service Matters (ACCSM). It was expected that concrete measures to be done to implement the declaration will be discussed in the 31st ASEAN Summit which was held in November 2017.

== 31st ASEAN Summit ==
2nd 2017 ASEAN Summit 31st ASEAN Summit
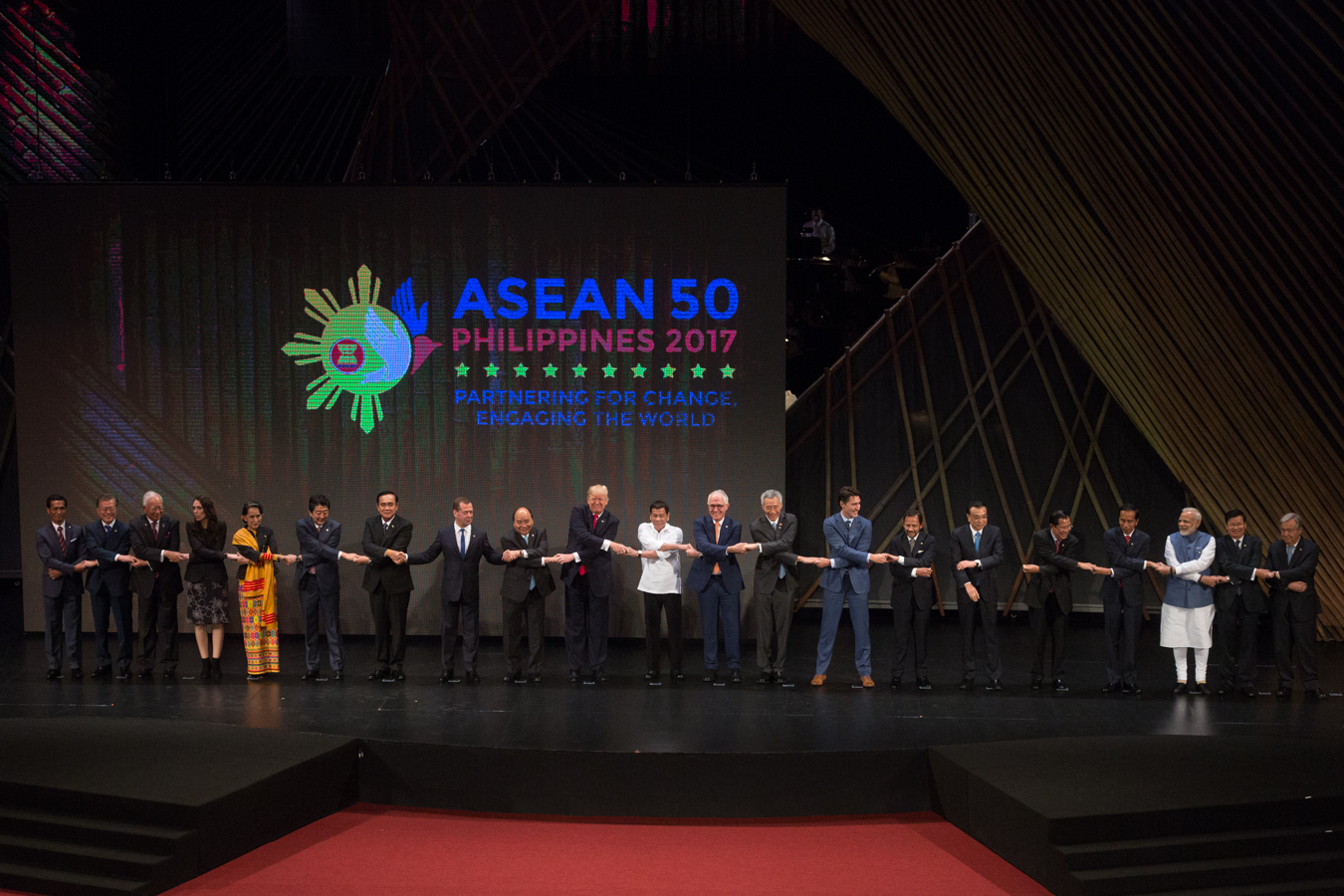
- Delegates of the 31st ASEAN Summit which includes leaders from outside ASEAN.
- Host country: Philippines
- Date: 10–14 November 2017
- Cities: Manila, Pasay
- Venues: Cultural Center of the Philippines Complex
- Participants: ASEAN members Guest invitees (see below)
- Chair: President Rodrigo Duterte
- Follows: 2017 ASEAN Summit (in May)
- Precedes: 2018 ASEAN Summit

The culminating event was held in Manila on 10–14 November (31st summit).

Despite some criticism on ASEAN's handling of the Rohingya crisis in Myanmar, many viewed the Philippines' performance as a success. According to political analyst Richard Javad Heydarian, "Overall, Duterte was a clear big winner at the summit, as he eagerly welcomed the courtship of all major powers, including America, China, Japan, Russia and India. The Filipino president deftly leveraged the event to effectively legitimize his leadership and present himself as a regional powerbroker...upon the summit’s conclusion, Duterte’s Philippines never looked as confident and secure. All in all, it was a crowning diplomatic event for the controversial Filipino leader."

=== Attendees ===
All heads of government of the member states of the Association of Southeast Asian Nations except Myanmar attended the 30th ASEAN Summit. In the case of Myanmar, the country was represented by its State Counsellor, Aung San Suu Kyi.

**ASEAN members** Host state and leader are shown in bold text.
Member	Represented by	Title
Brunei	Sultan Hassanal Bolkiah	King
Cambodia	Hun Sen	Prime Minister
Indonesia	Joko Widodo	President
Laos	Thongloun Sisoulith	Prime Minister
Malaysia	Najib Razak	Prime Minister
Myanmar	Aung San Suu Kyi	State Counsellor
**Philippines**	**Rodrigo Duterte**	**President**
Singapore	Lee Hsien Loong	Prime Minister
Thailand	Prayut Chan-o-cha	Prime Minister
Vietnam	Nguyen Xuan Phuc	Prime Minister
**Guest Invitees (countries)**
Member	Represented by	Title
Australia	Malcolm Turnbull	Prime Minister
Canada	Justin Trudeau	Prime Minister
China	Li Keqiang	Premier
India	Narendra Modi	Prime Minister
Japan	Shinzo Abe	Prime Minister
New Zealand	Jacinda Ardern	Prime Minister
Russia	Dmitry Medvedev	Prime Minister
South Korea	Moon Jae-in	President
United States	Donald Trump	President
**Guest Invitees (international institutions)**
Member	Represented by	Title
European Union	Donald Tusk	President
United Nations	António Guterres	Secretary General
