= Manila Summit Conference =

Seven nation conference in 1966

Manila Summit Conference Seven Nations Summit Conference
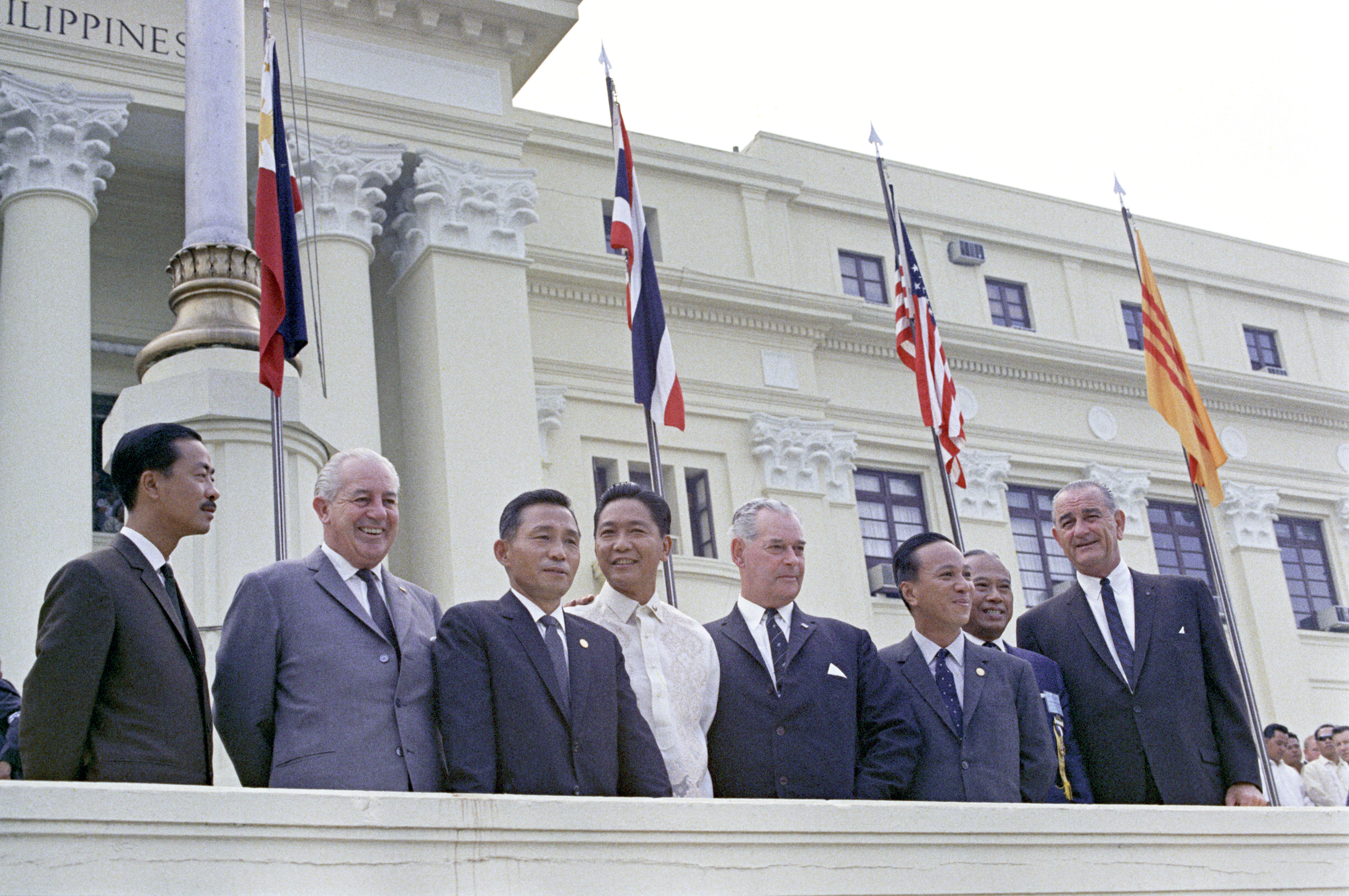
- The leaders of the participating countries in front of the Congress Building in Manila on 24 October 1966
- Host country: Philippines
- Date: 24–25 October 1966
- Cities: Manila
- Venues: Congress Building
- Participants: Australia, New Zealand, Philippines, South Korea, South Vietnam, Thailand, and the United States

The Manila Summit Conference was a seven nation conference to discuss the Vietnam War. It was held in Manila 24–25 October 1966.

== Participants ==
The summit conference was hosted by president Ferdinand Marcos of the Philippines. The other attendees were prime ministers Harold Holt of Australia, Keith Holyoake of New Zealand, and Thanom Kittikachorn of Thailand as well as presidents Park Chung Hee of South Korea and Lyndon B. Johnson of the United States. South Vietnam was represented by Chairman of the National Leadership Committee Nguyễn Văn Thiệu and prime minister Nguyễn Cao Kỳ.

== Events ==
The summit opened on 24 October. The two South Vietnamese leaders and General William Westmoreland, the Commander of Military Assistance Command, Vietnam provided reviews of the political and military situation in South Vietnam. On the following day, a communiqué was discussed and approved. Three conference documents were publicly announced: the Declaration of Goals of Freedom, the Joint Communiqué, and the Declaration of Peace and Progress in Asia and the Pacific. The seven nations endorsed a six-point peace proposal and offered to withdraw the allied forces from South Vietnam completely within six months after "the other side withdraws its forces to the North, ceases infiltration, and the level of violence thus subsides." North Vietnam rejected the conditions and the war continued.

After the conclusion of the Manila Conference, President Johnson visited South Vietnam, Thailand, Malaysia, and South Korea, before returning to Washington on 2 November.

Prime minister Holt reported on the results of the conference to the Parliament of Australia on 27 October 1966.

== See also ==
- 2017 ASEAN Summits
- APEC Philippines 1996
- APEC Philippines 2015
- List of diplomatic visits to the Philippines
- Second East Asia Summit
- Twelfth East Asia Summit
