= List of diplomatic visits to the Philippines =

This is a list of visits made to the Philippines by heads of state and/or heads of government for diplomatic reasons, which is classified by the Philippine Department of Foreign Affairs as either a state visit, official visit, or working visit.

The scope of the list includes visits by:

- heads of state and heads of government
- The top leaders of international organizations whose membership compose of sovereign nations (e.g. United Nations, European Union)

Excluded are visits by (but not limited to):

- Government ministers/secretaries, unless if the person makes the visit under the capacity stated above (e.g. Prime Ministers)
- Government agency heads
- Heads of sub-national jurisdictions (e.g. states, provinces, cities)
- Members of royal families aside from the reigning monarch
- Spouses of the head of states and governments

Sultan Hassanal Bolkiah of Brunei has the most visits (10), followed by former President Sukarno of Indonesia with six. Representatives from Thailand have the most visits, with 26. Representatives from the United States, of which the Philippines is a major non-NATO ally, have the most visits outside of Asian countries. Ban Ki-moon has the most visits from a Secretary General of the United Nations, with two visits. Japanese Prime Minister Hideki Tojo's 1943 visit was the first state visit to the Philippines, while Sukarno's in 1951 was the first visit since the Philippines was granted independence.

== List of official dignitary visits ==
=== By leaders of sovereign nations ===
==== Presidency of Bongbong Marcos ====
Country	Name	Title	Date	Notes	Ref.
Brazil	Luiz Inácio Lula da Silva	President	November 13–16, 2026	State visit before attending the 49th ASEAN Summit and related meetings as a guest invitee to commemorate the 80th anniversary of Brazil–Philippines relations; first sitting Brazilian head of state to visit the Philippines	
Poland	Karol Nawrocki	President	October 5–8, 2026	State visit; first sitting Polish head of state to visit the Philippines	
Germany	Frank-Walter Steinmeier	President	June 15–17, 2026	State visit	
Vietnam	Tô Lâm	President	May 31 – June 1, 2026	State visit	
Paraguay	Santiago Peña	President	May 10–12, 2026	Official visit	
Brunei	Hassanal Bolkiah	Sultan	May 6–8, 2026	Attended the 48th ASEAN Summit and related meetings in Lapu-Lapu City	
Cambodia	Hun Manet	Prime Minister	May 7–8, 2026	Attended the 48th ASEAN Summit and related meetings in Lapu-Lapu City	
Indonesia	Prabowo Subianto	President	May 7–9, 2026	Attended the 48th ASEAN Summit and related meetings in Lapu-Lapu City	
Laos	Sonexay Siphandone	Prime Minister	May 7–9, 2026	Attended the 48th ASEAN Summit and related meetings in Lapu-Lapu City	
Malaysia	Anwar Ibrahim	Prime Minister	May 7–8, 2026	Attended the 48th ASEAN Summit and related meetings in Lapu-Lapu City	
Singapore	Lawrence Wong	Prime Minister	May 7–9, 2026	Attended the 48th ASEAN Summit and related meetings in Lapu-Lapu City	
Thailand	Anutin Charnvirakul	Prime Minister	May 7–9, 2026	Attended the 48th ASEAN Summit and related meetings in Lapu-Lapu City	
Timor-Leste	Xanana Gusmão	Prime Minister	May 7–9, 2026	Attended the 48th ASEAN Summit and related meetings in Lapu-Lapu City	
Vietnam	Lê Minh Hưng	Prime Minister	May 7–8, 2026	Attended the 48th ASEAN Summit and related meetings in Lapu-Lapu City	
Bhutan	Tshering Tobgay	Prime Minister	March 19, 2026	Working visit; visited the Asian Development Bank headquarters	
South Korea	Lee Jae Myung	President	March 3–4, 2026	State visit	
Singapore	Lawrence Wong	Prime Minister	June 4–5, 2025	Official visit	
Japan	Shigeru Ishiba	Prime Minister	April 29–30, 2025	Official visit	
Palau	Surangel Whipps Jr.	President	February 23–24, 2025	Official visit	
Cambodia	Hun Manet	Prime Minister	February 10–11, 2025	Official visit	
South Korea	Yoon Suk Yeol	President	October 6–7, 2024	State visit	
Singapore	Tharman Shanmugaratnam	President	August 15–17, 2024	State visit	
Ukraine	Volodymyr Zelenskyy	President	June 2–3, 2024	Working visit	
Qatar	Tamim bin Hamad Al Thani	Emir	April 21–22, 2024	State visit	
New Zealand	Christopher Luxon	Prime Minister	April 18–20, 2024	Official visit	
Marshall Islands	Hilda C. Heine	President	March 7, 2024	Working visit	
Indonesia	Joko Widodo	President	January 9–11, 2024	Official visit	
Timor-Leste	José Ramos-Horta	President	November 8–11, 2023	State visit	
Japan	Fumio Kishida	Prime Minister	November 3–4, 2023	Official visit; addressed a joint session of Congress	
Micronesia	Wesley Simina	President	October 13, 2023	Met with President Bongbong Marcos at Malacañang	
Australia	Anthony Albanese	Prime Minister	September 7–8, 2023	Official visit	
Montenegro	Dritan Abazović	Prime Minister	September 1, 2023	Attended the FIBA Basketball World Cup game between Montenegro and the United States; met with President Marcos at Malacañang; appeared on CNN Philippines' The Final Word with Rico Hizon	
Czech Republic	Petr Fiala	Prime Minister	April 16–18, 2023	Official visit	
Malaysia	Anwar Ibrahim	Prime Minister	March 1–2, 2023	Official visit	
Sri Lanka	Ranil Wickremesinghe	President	September 29, 2022	Met with President Marcos in a courtesy call; chaired the 55th Board of Governors meeting of the Asian Development Bank	
Australia	David Hurley	Governor-General	June 30, 2022	Attended the inauguration of President Marcos	

==== Presidency of Rodrigo Duterte ====
Country	Name	Title	Date	Notes	Ref.
Brunei	Hassanal Bolkiah	Sultan	November 30 – December 1, 2019	Official visit; attended the opening ceremony of the 2019 Southeast Asian Games	
India	Ram Nath Kovind	President	October 17–21, 2019	State visit to mark 70th anniversary of Philippines–India diplomatic relations	
Singapore	Halimah Yacob	President	September 8–12, 2019	State visit to mark 50th anniversary of Philippines–Singapore diplomatic relations; visited Davao City	
Malaysia	Mahathir Mohamad	Prime Minister	March 6–7, 2019	Official visit	
Sri Lanka	Maithripala Sirisena	President	January 15–19, 2019	State visit	
China	Xi Jinping	General Secretary and President	November 20–21, 2018	State visit	
Papua New Guinea	Peter O'Neill	Prime Minister	May 15–17, 2018	Official visit	
Australia	Malcolm Turnbull	Prime Minister	November 12–14, 2017	Attended the 31st ASEAN Summit and the Twelfth East Asia Summit in Pasay	
Brunei	Hassanal Bolkiah	Sultan	November 12–14, 2017	Attended the 31st ASEAN Summit and the Twelfth East Asia Summit in Pasay	
Cambodia	Hun Sen	Prime Minister	November 11–14, 2017	Attended the 31st ASEAN Summit and the Twelfth East Asia Summit in Pasay	
Canada	Justin Trudeau	Prime Minister	November 12–14, 2017	Attended the 31st ASEAN Summit and the Twelfth East Asia Summit in Pasay	
China	Li Keqiang	Premier	November 12–16, 2017	Official visit after attending the 31st ASEAN Summit and the Twelfth East Asia Summit in Pasay	
India	Narendra Modi	Prime Minister	November 12–14, 2017	Attended the 31st ASEAN Summit and the Twelfth East Asia Summit in Pasay	
Indonesia	Joko Widodo	President	November 12–14, 2017	Attended the 31st ASEAN Summit and the Twelfth East Asia Summit in Pasay	
Japan	Shinzō Abe	Prime Minister	November 12–14, 2017	Attended the 31st ASEAN Summit and the Twelfth East Asia Summit in Pasay	
Laos	Thongloun Sisoulith	Prime Minister	November 12–14, 2017	Attended the 31st ASEAN Summit and the Twelfth East Asia Summit in Pasay	
Malaysia	Najib Razak	Prime Minister	November 12–14, 2017	Attended the 31st ASEAN Summit and the Twelfth East Asia Summit in Pasay	
Myanmar	Aung San Suu Kyi	State Counsellor	November 11–14, 2017	Attended the 31st ASEAN Summit and the Twelfth East Asia Summit in Pasay	
New Zealand	Jacinda Ardern	Prime Minister	November 12–14, 2017	Attended the 31st ASEAN Summit and the Twelfth East Asia Summit in Pasay	
Russia	Dmitry Medvedev	Prime Minister	November 12–14, 2017	Attended the 31st ASEAN Summit and the Twelfth East Asia Summit in Pasay	
Singapore	Lee Hsien Loong	Prime Minister	November 12–14, 2017	Attended the 31st ASEAN Summit and the Twelfth East Asia Summit in Pasay	
South Korea	Moon Jae-in	President	November 12–14, 2017	Attended the 31st ASEAN Summit and the Twelfth East Asia Summit in Pasay	
Thailand	Prayut Chan-o-cha	Prime Minister	November 12–14, 2017	Attended the 31st ASEAN Summit and the Twelfth East Asia Summit in Pasay	
Vietnam	Nguyễn Xuân Phúc	Prime Minister	November 12–14, 2017	Attended the 31st ASEAN Summit and the Twelfth East Asia Summit in Pasay	
United States	Donald Trump	President	November 12–14, 2017	Attended the 31st ASEAN Summit and the Twelfth East Asia Summit in Pasay	
Cambodia	Hun Sen	Prime Minister	April 28–30, 2017	Attended the 30th ASEAN Summit	
Indonesia	Joko Widodo	President	April 28–30, 2017	State visit on April 28 prior to attending the 30th ASEAN Summit; traveled to Davao City with President Rodrigo Duterte to inaugurate the Davao City–General Santos–Bitung sea trade route	
Laos	Thongloun Sisoulith	Prime Minister	April 28–29, 2017	Attended the 30th ASEAN Summit	
Myanmar	Aung San Suu Kyi	State Counsellor	April 28–29, 2017	Attended the 30th ASEAN Summit	
Singapore	Lee Hsien Loong	Prime Minister	April 28–29, 2017	Attended the 30th ASEAN Summit	
Thailand	Prayut Chan-o-cha	Prime Minister	April 28–29, 2017	Attended the 30th ASEAN Summit	
Vietnam	Nguyễn Xuân Phúc	Prime Minister	April 28–29, 2017	Attended the 30th ASEAN Summit	
Malaysia	Najib Razak	Prime Minister	April 27–30, 2017	Attended the 30th ASEAN Summit	
Brunei	Hassanal Bolkiah	Sultan	April 26–29, 2017	State visit on April 27 prior to attending the 30th ASEAN Summit	
Japan	Shinzō Abe	Prime Minister	January 12–13, 2017	Official visit; visited Davao City	

==== Presidency of Benigno Aquino III ====
Country	Name	Title	Date	Notes	Ref.
Monaco	Albert II	Prince	April 6–7, 2016	Official visit	
Japan	Akihito	Emperor	January 26–30, 2016	State visit to mark 60th anniversary of Japan–Philippines diplomatic relations; accompanied by Empress Michiko	
Japan	Shinzō Abe	Prime Minister	November 18–20, 2015	Attended the 2015 APEC Economic Leaders' Meeting	
Russia	Dmitry Medvedev	Prime Minister	November 18–20, 2015	Attended the 2015 APEC Economic Leaders' Meeting, representing President Vladimir Putin	
Peru	Ollanta Humala	President	November 18–19, 2015	Attended the 2015 APEC Economic Leaders' Meeting	
Singapore	Lee Hsien Loong	Prime Minister	November 18–19, 2015	Attended the 2015 APEC Economic Leaders' Meeting	
Thailand	Prayuth Chan-ocha	Prime Minister	November 18–19, 2015	Attended the 2015 APEC Economic Leaders' Meeting	
Canada	Justin Trudeau	Prime Minister	November 17–20, 2015	Attended the 2015 APEC Economic Leaders' Meeting	
New Zealand	John Key	Prime Minister	November 17–20, 2015	Attended the 2015 APEC Economic Leaders' Meeting	
South Korea	Park Geun-hye	President	November 17–20, 2015	Attended the 2015 APEC Economic Leaders' Meeting	
United States	Barack Obama	President	November 17–20, 2015	Attended the 2015 APEC Economic Leaders' Meeting	
Australia	Malcolm Turnbull	Prime Minister	November 17–19, 2015	Attended the 2015 APEC Economic Leaders' Meeting	
Brunei	Hassanal Bolkiah	Sultan	November 17–19, 2015	Attended the 2015 APEC Economic Leaders' Meeting	
China	Xi Jinping	General Secretary and President	November 17–19, 2015	Attended the 2015 APEC Economic Leaders' Meeting	
Malaysia	Najib Razak	Prime Minister	November 17–19, 2015	Attended the 2015 APEC Economic Leaders' Meeting	
Vietnam	Trương Tấn Sang	President	November 17–19, 2015	Attended the 2015 APEC Economic Leaders' Meeting	
Papua New Guinea	Peter O'Neill	Prime Minister	November 16–20, 2015	Attended the 2015 APEC Economic Leaders' Meeting	
Colombia	Juan Manuel Santos	President	November 16–19, 2015	Attended the 2015 APEC Economic Leaders' Meeting in an observer status	
Mexico	Enrique Peña Nieto	President	November 16–19, 2015	State visit prior to attending the 2015 APEC Economic Leaders' Meeting	
Chile	Michelle Bachelet	President	November 15–19, 2015	State visit prior to attending the 2015 APEC Economic Leaders' Meeting	
Thailand	Prayut Chan-o-cha	Prime Minister	August 27–28, 2015	State visit	
France	François Hollande	President	February 26–27, 2015	State visit; visited Guiuan	
Indonesia	Joko Widodo	President	February 8–10, 2015	State visit	
Vatican City	Francis	Pope	January 15–19, 2015	Main article: Pope Francis's visit to the Philippines Papal Apostolic and State Visit; visited Palo and Tacloban to meet with victims of Typhoon Haiyan	
Turkey	Ahmet Davutoğlu	Prime Minister	November 17–18, 2014	Official visit	
Bhutan	Tshering Tobgay	Prime Minister	September 5, 2014	Visited the headquarters of the Asian Development Bank in Manila	
Indonesia	Susilo Bambang Yudhoyono	President	May 22–23, 2014	State visit; attended the World Economic Forum on East Asia	
Vietnam	Nguyễn Tấn Dũng	Prime Minister	May 21–23, 2014	Official visit; attended the World Economic Forum on East Asia	
United States	Barack Obama	President	April 28–29, 2014	State visit; met with U.S. and Filipino troops at Fort Bonifacio	
Singapore	Tony Tan	President	April 2–5, 2014	State visit	
Malaysia	Najib Razak	Prime Minister	March 27, 2014	Working visit; witnessed the signing of the Comprehensive Agreement on the Bangsamoro	
Sweden	Carl XVI Gustaf	King	January 24–26, 2014	Visited the projects of the Boy Scouts of the Philippines in Tacloban, a city devastated by Typhoon Haiyan	
Myanmar	Thein Sein	President	December 4–6, 2013	State visit	
Japan	Shinzō Abe	Prime Minister	July 26–27, 2013	State visit	
Timor-Leste	Xanana Gusmão	Prime Minister	June 5–9, 2013	Official visit	
Brunei	Hassanal Bolkiah	Sultan	April 15–16, 2013	State visit	
Canada	Stephen Harper	Prime Minister	November 9–12, 2012	Official visit	
France	Jean-Marc Ayrault	Prime Minister	October 19–21, 2012	State visit	
Malaysia	Najib Razak	Prime Minister	October 14–15, 2012	Official visit	
Laos	Thongsing Thammavong	Prime Minister	May 10–12, 2012	State visit	
Australia	Quentin Bryce	Governor-General	April 12–13, 2012	State visit	
Qatar	Hamad bin Khalifa Al Thani	Emir	April 9, 2012	State visit	
Thailand	Yingluck Shinawatra	Prime Minister	January 19, 2012	Official visit	
South Korea	Lee Myung-bak	President	November 20–22, 2011	State visit	
Vietnam	Trương Tấn Sang	President	October 26–28, 2011	State visit	
Timor-Leste	José Ramos-Horta	President	June 28–July 2010	Attended the inauguration of President Benigno Aquino III	

==== Presidency of Gloria Macapagal Arroyo ====
Country	Name	Title	Date	Notes	Ref.
Czech Republic	Jan Fischer	Prime Minister	September 6–7, 2009	Official visit	
Thailand	Abhisit Vejjajiva	Prime Minister	August 14, 2009		
Timor-Leste	José Ramos-Horta	President	August 5, 2009	Attended the funeral of former President Corazon Aquino	
Papua New Guinea	Michael Somare	Prime Minister	March 29 – April 1, 2009	Official visit; visited Boracay, Aklan	
Timor-Leste	José Ramos-Horta	President	January 14–15, 2009	Lecture visit at the Ateneo de Davao University in Davao City	
Kuwait	Nasser Mohammed Al-Ahmed Al-Sabah	Prime Minister	August 14–16, 2008	Official visit	
Timor-Leste	José Ramos-Horta	President	January 14–15, 2009	State visit	
Vietnam	Nguyễn Tấn Dũng	Prime Minister	August 9–10, 2007	Official visit	
Swaziland	Mswati III	King	May 26, 2008	State visit; private visit to Bohol and Cebu	
Thailand	Samak Sundaravej	Prime Minister	May 22–23, 2008	Official visit; met with President Gloria Macapagal Arroyo to enhance tourism growth within ASEAN	
China	Wen Jiabao	Premier	January 15–16, 2007	Official visit; attended the Second East Asia Summit in Mandaue	
India	Manmohan Singh	Prime Minister	January 14, 2007	Attended the Second East Asia Summit and the 5th ASEAN-India Summit in Mandaue	
Vietnam	Nguyễn Tấn Dũng	Prime Minister	January 11–14, 2007	Official visit; attended the 12th ASEAN Summit and the Second East Asia Summit in Mandaue	
Australia	John Howard	Prime Minister	January 2007	Attended the Second East Asia Summit in Mandaue	
Brunei	Hassanal Bolkiah	Sultan	January 2007	Attended the 12th ASEAN Summit and the Second East Asia Summit in Mandaue	
Cambodia	Hun Sen	Prime Minister	January 2007	Attended the 12th ASEAN Summit and the Second East Asia Summit in Mandaue	
Indonesia	Susilo Bambang Yudhoyono	President	January 2007	Attended the 12th ASEAN Summit and the Second East Asia Summit in Mandaue	
Japan	Shinzō Abe	Prime Minister	January 2007	Attended the Second East Asia Summit in Mandaue	
Laos	Bouasone Bouphavanh	Prime Minister	January 2007	Attended the 12th ASEAN Summit and the Second East Asia Summit in Mandaue	
Malaysia	Abdullah Ahmad Badawi	Prime Minister	January 2007	Attended the 12th ASEAN Summit and the Second East Asia Summit in Mandaue	
Myanmar	Soe Win	Prime Minister	January 2007	Attended the 12th ASEAN Summit and the Second East Asia Summit in Mandaue	
New Zealand	Helen Clark	Prime Minister	January 2007	Attended the Second East Asia Summit in Mandaue	
Singapore	Lee Hsien Loong	Prime Minister	January 2007	Attended the 12th ASEAN Summit and the Second East Asia Summit in Mandaue	
South Korea	Roh Moo-hyun	President	January 2007	Attended the Second East Asia Summit in Mandaue	
Thailand	Surayud Chulanont	Prime Minister	January 2007	Attended the Second East Asia Summit in Mandaue	
Thailand	Surayud Chulanont	Prime Minister	October 23, 2006	Official visit; part of "familiarization tour"	
India	A. P. J. Abdul Kalam	President	October 3–6, 2006	State visit; addressed the joint session of Philippine Congress	
Equatorial Guinea	Teodoro Obiang Nguema Mbasogo	President	May 2006	State visit	
South Korea	Roh Moo-hyun	President	December 15–16, 2005	State visit	
Poland	Marek Belka	Prime Minister	July 6–8, 2005	Official visit	
The Gambia	Yahya Jammeh	President	June 20–25, 2005	State visit	
Indonesia	Susilo Bambang Yudhoyono	President	June 20–21, 2005	State visit; discussed counter-terrorism cooperation with President Arroyo	
China	Hu Jintao	General Secretary and President	April 27–28, 2005	State visit	
Pakistan	Pervez Musharraf	President	April 18–20, 2005	State visit; addressed Philippine Congress	
Malaysia	Abdullah Ahmad Badawi	Prime Minister	January 23, 2004	Met with President Arroyo to discuss regional security and the Moro conflict	
Kazakhstan	Nursultan Nazarbayev	President	November 10–14, 2003	State visit	
United States	George W. Bush	President	October 18–19, 2003	State visit; addressed a joint session of the Philippine Congress	
Thailand	Thaksin Shinawatra	Prime Minister	September 7–8, 2003	Regional visit	
Australia	John Howard	Prime Minister	July 14–15, 2003	Official visit	
Romania	Ion Iliescu	President	February 20–22, 2002	State visit	
Vietnam	Trần Đức Lương	President	November 14–16, 2001	Official visit	
Indonesia	Megawati Sukarnoputri	President	August 21, 2001	State visit	
Indonesia	Abdurrahman Wahid	President	June 29, 2001	Working visit	

==== Presidency of Joseph Estrada ====
Country	Name	Title	Date	Notes	Ref.
Mongolia	Natsagiin Bagabandi	President	September 1–4, 2000	State visit	
Cambodia	Hun Sen	Prime Minister	August 16–19, 2000	State visit	
Spain	José María Aznar	Prime Minister	June 29 – July 1, 2000	Official visit	
China	Jiang Zemin	General Secretary and President	May 16–19, 2000	State visit	
Brunei	Hassanal Bolkiah	Sultan	November 28–30, 1999	Attended the 3rd ASEAN Informal Summit in Manila	
Cambodia	Hun Sen	Prime Minister	November 28–30, 1999	Attended the 3rd ASEAN Informal Summit in Manila	
Indonesia	Abdurrahman Wahid	President	November 28–30, 1999	Attended the 3rd ASEAN Informal Summit in Manila	
Japan	Keizo Obuchi	Prime Minister	November 27–30, 1999	State visit; attended the ASEAN Plus Three summit	
Laos	Sisavath Keobounphanh	Prime Minister	November 28–30, 1999	Attended the 3rd ASEAN Informal Summit in Manila	
Myanmar	Than Shwe	Prime Minister	November 28–30, 1999	Attended the 3rd ASEAN Informal Summit in Manila	
Singapore	Goh Chok Tong	Prime Minister	November 28–30, 1999	Attended the 3rd ASEAN Informal Summit in Manila	
South Korea	Kim Dae-jung	President	November 27–30, 1999	State visit; attended the ASEAN Plus Three summit	
Thailand	Chuan Leekpai	Prime Minister	November 28–30, 1999	Attended the 3rd ASEAN Informal Summit in Manila	
Vietnam	Phan Văn Khải	Prime Minister	November 28–30, 1999	Attended the 3rd ASEAN Informal Summit in Manila	
China	Zhu Rongji	Premier	November 26, 1999	Official visit	
Venezuela	Hugo Chavez	President	October 1999	State visit	
Thailand	Chuan Leekpai	Prime Minister	June 13–15, 1999	Official visit to mark 50th anniversary of Philippines–Thailand diplomatic relations	
Turkey	Süleyman Demirel	President	February 1999	Official visit	
Monaco	Albert II	Prince	1999	Official visit	
South Korea	Kim Dae-jung	President	November 1998	Attended an APEC informal summit	

==== Presidency of Fidel V. Ramos ====
Country	Name	Title	Date	Notes	Ref.
South Korea	Lee Soo-sung	Prime Minister	June 12, 1998	Attended the celebrations of the centennial of Philippine independence	
Myanmar	Than Shwe	Prime Minister	February 17–19, 1998	State visit	
Spain	Juan Carlos I	King	February 11–13, 1998	State Visit; accompanied by Queen Sofía	
Italy	Romano Prodi	Prime Minister	October 1997		
South Africa	Nelson Mandela	President	March 1–3, 1997	State visit	
Thailand	Chavalit Yongchaiyudh	Prime Minister	January 29–30, 1997	Official visit	
Canada	Jean Chrétien	Prime Minister	January 14–16, 1997	Official visit	
Australia	John Howard	Prime Minister	November 1996	Attended the 1996 APEC Economic Leaders' Meeting in Manila and Subic Bay	
Brunei	Hassanal Bolkiah	Sultan	November 1996	Attended the 1996 APEC Economic Leaders' Meeting in Manila and Subic Bay	
Canada	Jean Chrétien	Prime Minister	November 1996	Attended the 1996 APEC Economic Leaders' Meeting in Manila and Subic Bay	
Chile	Eduardo Frei Ruiz-Tagle	President	November 1996	Attended the 1996 APEC Economic Leaders' Meeting in Manila and Subic Bay	
China	Jiang Zemin	General Secretary and President	November 24–28, 1996	State visit after attending the 1996 APEC Economic Leaders' Meeting in Manila and Subic Bay	
Indonesia	Suharto	President	November 1996	Attended the 1996 APEC Economic Leaders' Meeting in Manila and Subic Bay	
Japan	Ryutaro Hashimoto	Prime Minister	November 24–26, 1996	Attended the 1996 APEC Economic Leaders' Meeting in Manila and Subic Bay	
Malaysia	Mahathir Mohamad	Prime Minister	November 1996	Attended the 1996 APEC Economic Leaders' Meeting in Manila and Subic Bay	
Mexico	Ernesto Zedillo	President	November 1996	Attended the 1996 APEC Economic Leaders' Meeting in Manila and Subic Bay	
New Zealand	Jim Bolger	Prime Minister	November 1996	Attended the 1996 APEC Economic Leaders' Meeting in Manila and Subic Bay	
Papua New Guinea	Julius Chan	Prime Minister	November 1996	Attended the 1996 APEC Economic Leaders' Meeting in Manila and Subic Bay	
Singapore	Goh Chok Tong	Prime Minister	November 1996	Attended the 1996 APEC Economic Leaders' Meeting in Manila and Subic Bay	
South Korea	Kim Young-sam	President	November 1996	Attended the 1996 APEC Economic Leaders' Meeting in Manila and Subic Bay	
Thailand	Banharn Silpa-archa	Prime Minister	November 22–23, 1996	Attended the 1996 APEC Economic Leaders' Meeting in Manila and Subic Bay	
United States	Bill Clinton	President	November 24–25, 1996	Attended the 1996 APEC Economic Leaders' Meeting in Manila and Subic Bay	
China	Jiang Zemin	General Secretary and President	November 23, 1996	State visit	
Peru	Alberto Fujimori	President	November 14–15, 1996	State visit; addressed business forum in University of the Philippines Los Baños	
Germany	Helmut Kohl	Chancellor	October 29-November 1, 1996	State visit	
Chile	Eduardo Frei Ruiz-Tagle	President	November 20–21, 1995	State visit	
Lithuania	Adolfas Šleževičius	Prime Minister	September 25–27, 1995		
Kyrgyzstan	Askar Akayev	President	July 22–26, 1995	State visit	
Czech Republic	Václav Havel	President	April 4–8, 1995	State visit	
Pakistan	Benazir Bhutto	Prime Minister	February 1995	Guest of President Fidel V. Ramos	
Vatican City	John Paul II	Pope	January 12–16, 1995	Visit for the 1995 World Youth Day	
United States	Bill Clinton	President	November 12–13, 1994	State visit; discussed the withdrawal of U.S. forces from U.S. bases in the Philippines	
South Korea	Kim Young-sam	President	November 1994		
Thailand	Chuan Leekpai	Prime Minister	March 24–27, 1993	Official visit	

==== Presidency of Corazon Aquino ====
Country	Name	Title	Date	Notes	Ref.
Vietnam	Võ Văn Kiệt	Prime Minister	February 26–28, 1992	Official visit	
China	Li Peng	Premier	December 13–15, 1990	Official visit	
Thailand	Chatichai Choonhavan	Prime Minister	January 26, 1989	Official visit	
Brunei	Hassanal Bolkiah	Sultan	December 14–15, 1987	Attended the 3rd ASEAN Summit	
Indonesia	Suharto	President	December 14–15, 1987	Attended the 3rd ASEAN Summit	
Malaysia	Mahathir Mohamad	Prime Minister	December 14–15, 1987	Attended the 3rd ASEAN Summit	
Singapore	Lee Kuan Yew	Prime Minister	December 14–15, 1987	Attended the 3rd ASEAN Summit	
Thailand	Prem Tinsulanonda	Prime Minister	December 14–15, 1987	Attended the 3rd ASEAN Summit	

==== Presidency of Ferdinand Marcos ====
Country	Name	Title	Date	Notes	Ref.
Japan	Yasuhiro Nakasone	Prime Minister	May 6–8, 1983	State visit	
Canada	Pierre Trudeau	Prime Minister	January 1983	Official visit	
China	Zhao Ziyang	Premier	August 6, 1981	State visit; discussed the supply of petroleum to the Philippines	
South Korea	Chun Doo-hwan	President	July 6–9, 1981	State visit; first South Korean head of government to visit the ASEAN member states	
Thailand	Prem Tinsulanonda	Prime Minister	June 30 – July 1, 1981	Official visit; attended the third inauguration of President Ferdinand Marcos	
Vatican City	John Paul II	Pope	February 17–22, 1981	Papal visit; visit for the beatification of San Lorenzo Ruiz	
Japan	Zenkō Suzuki	Prime Minister	January 8–10, 1981	State visit aimed at extending Japan's assistance and cooperation to the economic development of the Philippines	
Nauru	Hammer DeRoburt	President	August 29, 1980	Official visit	
Samoa	Tupuola Efi	Prime Minister	June 24–29, 1980	State visit	
Thailand	Prem Tinsulanonda	Prime Minister	May 15–16, 1980	Official visit; discussed with President Ferdinand Marcos bilateral and regional security matters	
Nauru	Hammer DeRoburt	President	May 1, 1980	Official visit	
New Zealand	Robert Muldoon	Prime Minister	January 27–30, 1980	State visit	
Austria	Bruno Kreisky	Chancellor	January 26–29, 1980	State visit	
Indonesia	Suharto	President	July 17, 1979	Working visit	
Nauru	Hammer DeRoburt	President	November 22–23, 1978	Official visit	
Mexico	José López Portillo	President	November 4–5, 1978	State visit	
Vietnam	Phạm Văn Đồng	Prime Minister	September 16–19, 1978	State visit	
Thailand	Kriangsak Chamanan	Prime Minister	February 20–23, 1978	State visit; discussed with President Marcos political development and regional cooperation within ASEAN	
Japan	Takeo Fukuda	Prime Minister	August 16–18, 1977	State visit	
Thailand	Tanin Kraivixien	Prime Minister	December 20–22, 1976	State visit; discussed with President Marcos economic relations and internal security problems	
Sri Lanka	Sirimavo Bandaranaike	Prime Minister	November 8–11, 1976	Official visit; discussed with President Marcos trade, industry, finance, education, and agriculture; visited Corregidor and Bataan	
Gabon	Omar Bongo	President	July 8–12, 1976	State visit	
United States	Gerald Ford	President	December 6–7, 1975	Official visit	
Thailand	Kukrit Pramoj	Prime Minister	July 21–24, 1975	State visit	
Romania	Nicolae Ceaușescu	President	April 9–13, 1975	State visit	
Singapore	Lee Kuan Yew	Prime Minister	January 15–17, 1974	State visit	
Japan	Kakuei Tanaka	Prime Minister	January 7–9, 1974	State visit; part of "good neighbor" tour around ASEAN member states	
Indonesia	Suharto	President	February 13–15, 1972	State visit	
Nepal	Mahendra	King	April 20–22, 1971	Official visit	
Vatican City	Paul VI	Pope	November 27–29, 1970	Papal visit	
Burma	Ne Win	President	November 18–21, 1970	State visit	
United States	Richard Nixon	President	July 26–27, 1969	State visit	
Japan	Eisaku Satō	Prime Minister	January 18–21, 1967	State visit aimed at reaffirming a peaceful and friendly post-war relationship between Japan and the Philippines	
United States	Lyndon B. Johnson	President	October 24–26, 1966	Attended the Manila Summit Conference aimed at resolving the Vietnam War; visited Los Baños and Corregidor	
Australia	Harold Holt	Prime Minister	October 24, 1966	Attended the Manila Summit Conference aimed at resolving the Vietnam War	
New Zealand	Keith Holyoake	Prime Minister	October 24, 1966	Attended the Manila Summit Conference aimed at resolving the Vietnam War	
South Korea	Park Chung-hee	President	October 24, 1966	Attended the Manila Summit Conference aimed at resolving the Vietnam War	
South Vietnam	Nguyễn Văn Thiệu	President	October 24, 1966	Attended the Manila Summit Conference aimed at resolving the Vietnam War	
South Vietnam	Nguyễn Cao Kỳ	Prime Minister	October 24, 1966	Attended the Manila Summit Conference aimed at resolving the Vietnam War	
Thailand	Thanom Kittikachorn	Prime Minister	October 24, 1966	Attended the Manila Summit Conference aimed at resolving the Vietnam War	
Thailand	Thanom Kittikachorn	Prime Minister	March 2–4, 1966	Official visit	

==== Presidency of Diosdado Macapagal ====
Country	Name	Title	Date	Notes	Ref.
Madagascar	Philibert Tsiranana	President	August 6–8, 1964	State visit, in reciprocation to a state visit of President Diosdado Macapagal to Madagascar in 1963	
Indonesia	Sukarno	President	May 5, 1964	Working visit; transit to Tokyo	
Indonesia	Sukarno	President	January 6–11, 1964	Official visit	
Japan	Hayato Ikeda	Prime Minister	September 23–26, 1963	Official visit	
West Germany	Heinrich Lübke	President	November 18–23, 1963	State visit	
Thailand	Bhumibol Adulyadej	King	July 9–14, 1963	State visit	
Indonesia	Sukarno	President	May 23, 1963	Working visit	
Malaysia	Tunku Abdul Rahman	Prime Minister	April 1–5, 1963	State visit	
Mexico	Adolfo López Mateos	President	October 20–23, 1962	State visit	
Laos	Boun Oum	Prime Minister	May 29, 1962	Official visit; good will mission	

==== Presidency of Carlos P. Garcia ====
Country	Name	Title	Date	Notes	Ref.
Argentina	Arturo Frondizi	President	December 11–13, 1961	State visit	
Indonesia	Sukarno	President	September 22, 1960	Working visit; transit to New York City	
United States	Dwight D. Eisenhower	President	June 14–16, 1960	State visit; addressed a joint session of the Philippine Congress	
South Vietnam	Ngo Dinh Diem	President	March 19–23, 1958	State visit	
Japan	Nobusuke Kishi	Prime Minister	December 6–7, 1957	State visit aimed at reaffirming a peaceful and friendly post-war relationship between Japan and the Philippines	
Australia	Robert Menzies	Prime Minister	April 22–23, 1957	State visit	

==== Presidency of Ramon Magsaysay ====
Country	Name	Title	Date	Notes	Ref.
Indonesia	Sukarno	President	May 14–16, 1956	State visit	
Thailand	Plaek Phibunsongkhram	Prime Minister	April 14–16, 1955	State visit	

==== Presidency of Elpidio Quirino ====
Country	Name	Title	Date	Notes	Ref.
Indonesia	Sukarno	President	January 28 – February 3, 1951	Official visit	

==== Philippine Executive Commission (Japanese occupation) ====
Country	Name	Title	Date	Notes	Ref.
Japan	Hideki Tojo	Prime Minister	May 6, 1943	See also: Philippine Executive Commission State visit; pledged for the establishment of a Japanese-sponsored Philippine Republic	

=== By leaders of international organizations ===
==== European Union ====
Name	Title	Date	Notes	Ref.
Ursula von der Leyen	President of the European Commission	July 31 – August 1, 2023	Official visit	
Donald Tusk	President of the European Council	November 13–14, 2017	Attended the 31st ASEAN Summit and the Twelfth East Asia Summit in Pasay	

==== Sovereign Military Order of Malta ====
Name	Title	Date	Notes	Ref.
Matthew Festing	Prince and Grand Master	March 1–7, 2015	Official visit; visited Basey, Samar to inspect humanitarian efforts by the Order of Malta for Typhoon Haiyan victims	
Angelo de Mojana di Cologna	Prince and Grand Master	February 1–5, 1979	Official visit	

==== United Nations ====
By the Secretary-General of the United Nations

Name	Date	Notes	Ref.
António Guterres	November 12–14, 2017	Attended the 31st ASEAN Summit and the Twelfth East Asia Summit in Pasay	
Ban Ki-moon	December 20–22, 2013	Visited Tacloban as part of the United Nations' humanitarian efforts on helping victims of Typhoon Haiyan	
Ban Ki-moon	October 28–29, 2008	Official visit	

== Gallery ==
President Bongbong Marcos hosting a state dinner for Polish President Karol Nawrocki at the Malacañang Palace during the latter's state visit to Manila, October 6, 2026

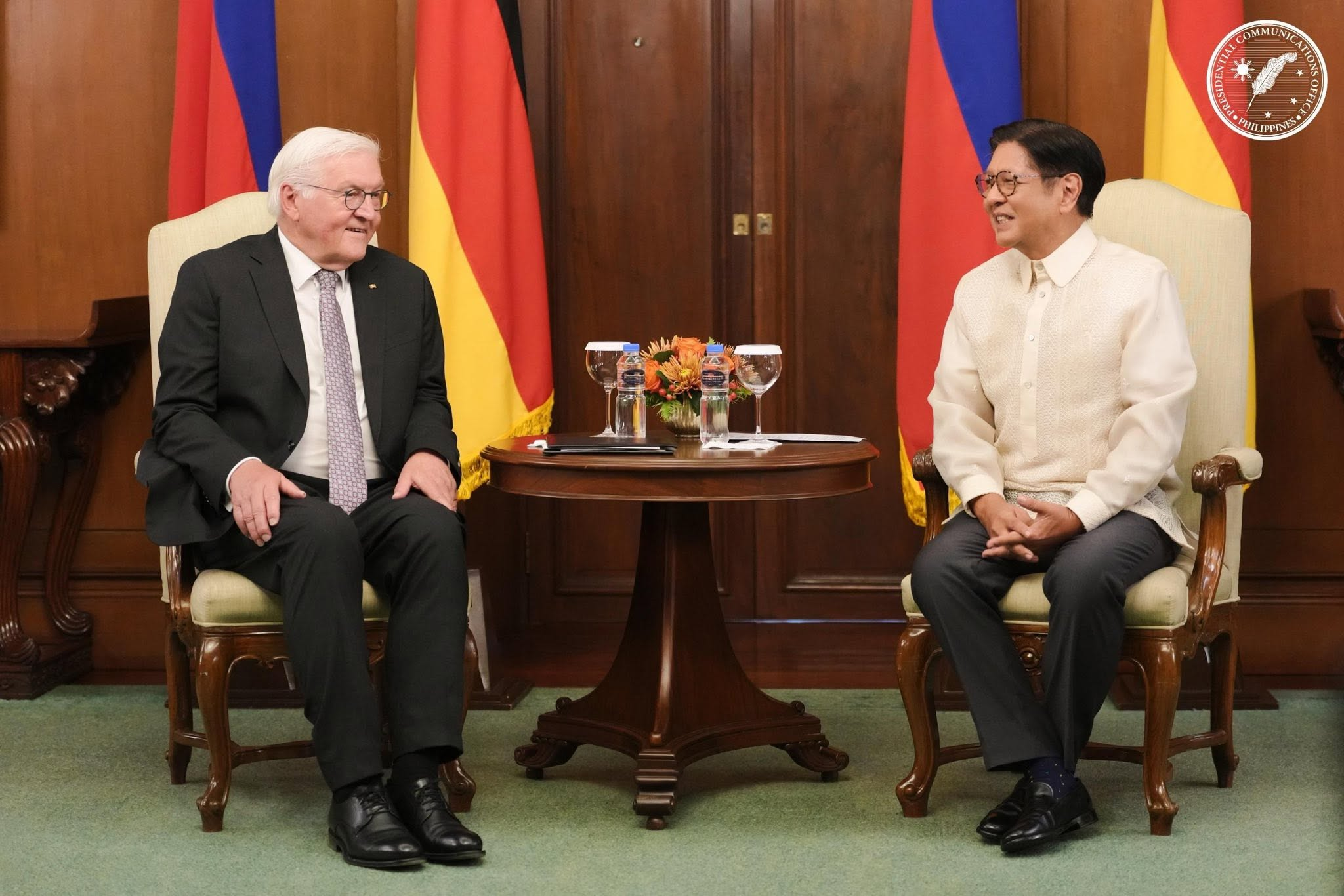
President Bongbong Marcos hosting German Federal President Frank-Walter Steinmeier during the latter's state visit to Manila, June 16, 2026

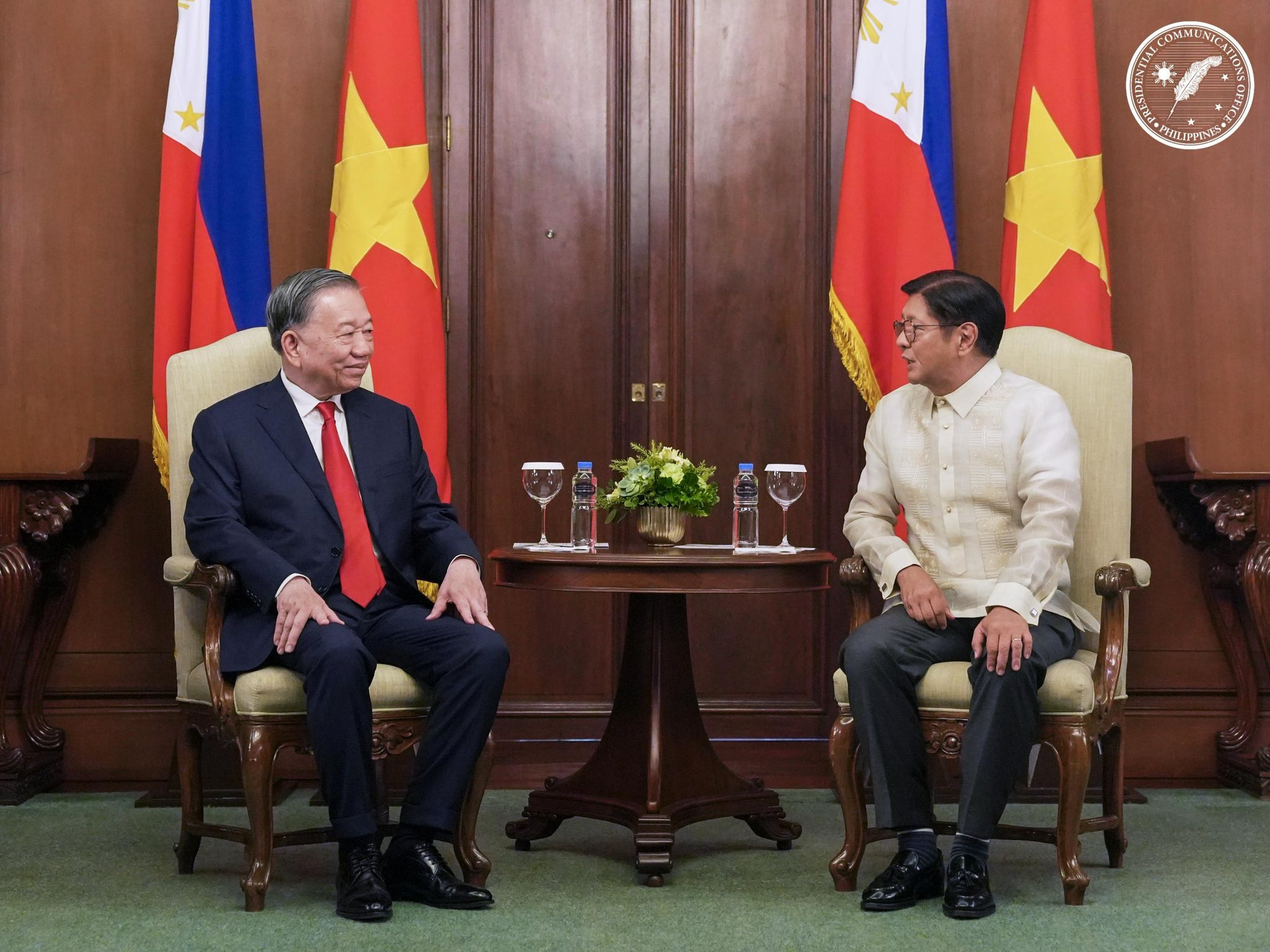
President Bongbong Marcos meeting with Vietnamese Communist General Secretary and President Tô Lâm during the latter's 2-day state visit to Manila, June 1, 2026

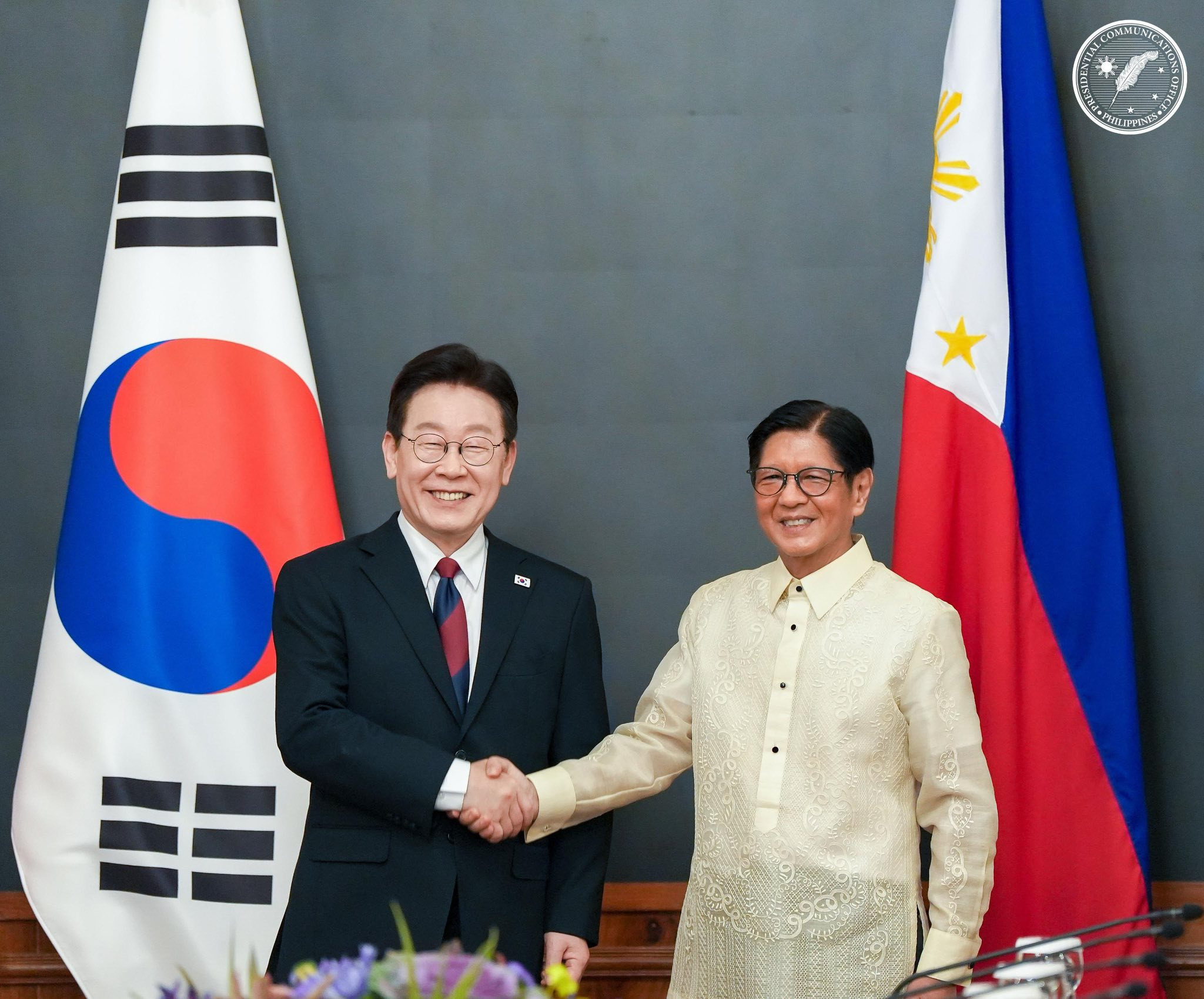
President Bongbong Marcos meeting with South Korean President Lee Jae Myung during the latter's state visit to Manila, March 3, 2026

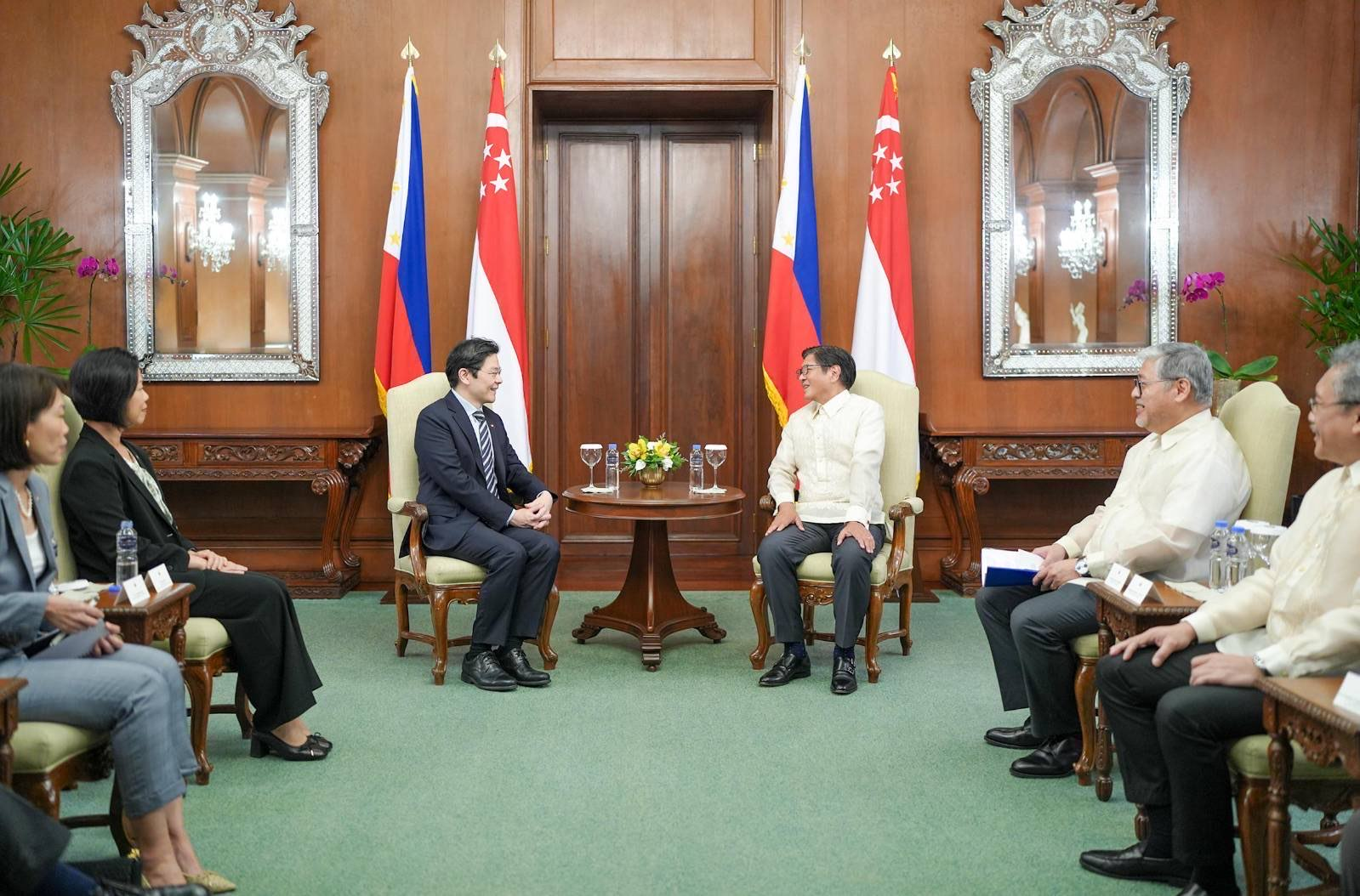
President Bongbong Marcos hosting Singaporean Prime Minister Lawrence Wong during the latter's official visit to Manila, June 4, 2025

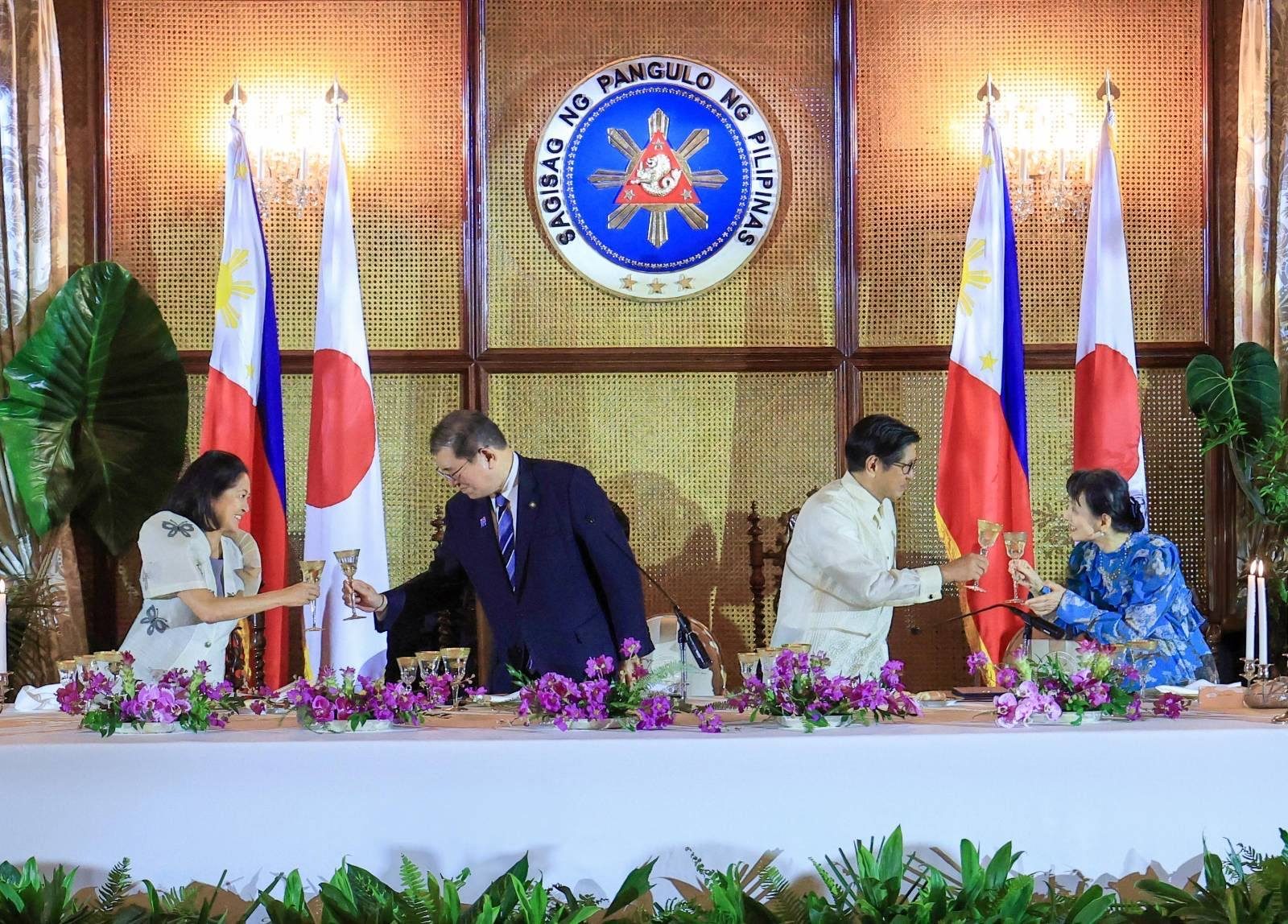
President Bongbong Marcos and First Lady Liza Araneta Marcos hosting a state dinner for Japanese Prime Minister Shigeru Ishiba and his spouse, Yoshiko Ishiba at the Malacañang Palace during the latter's official visit to Manila, April 29, 2025

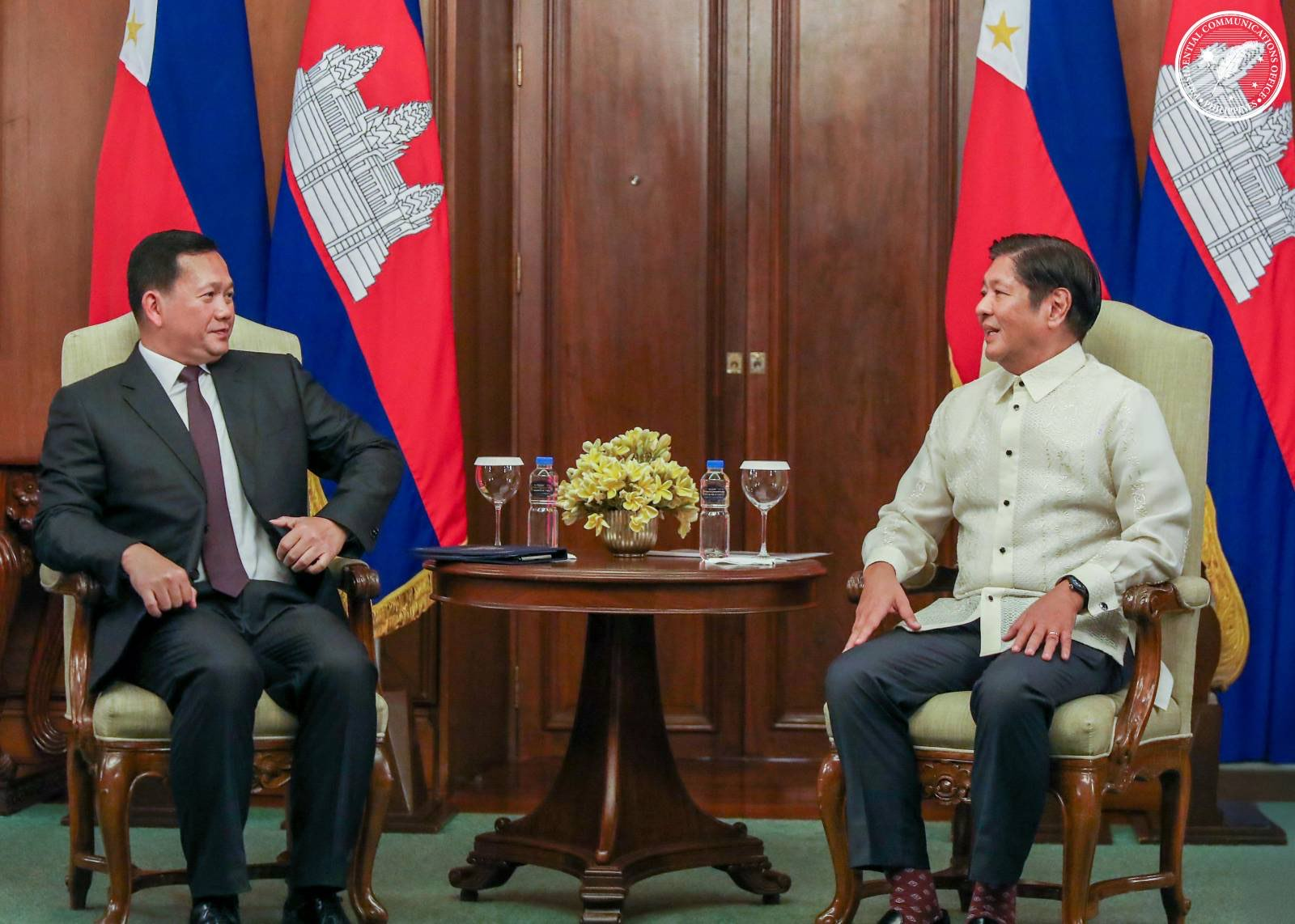
President Bongbong Marcos and Cambodian Prime Minister Hun Manet during the latter's official visit to Manila, February 11, 2025

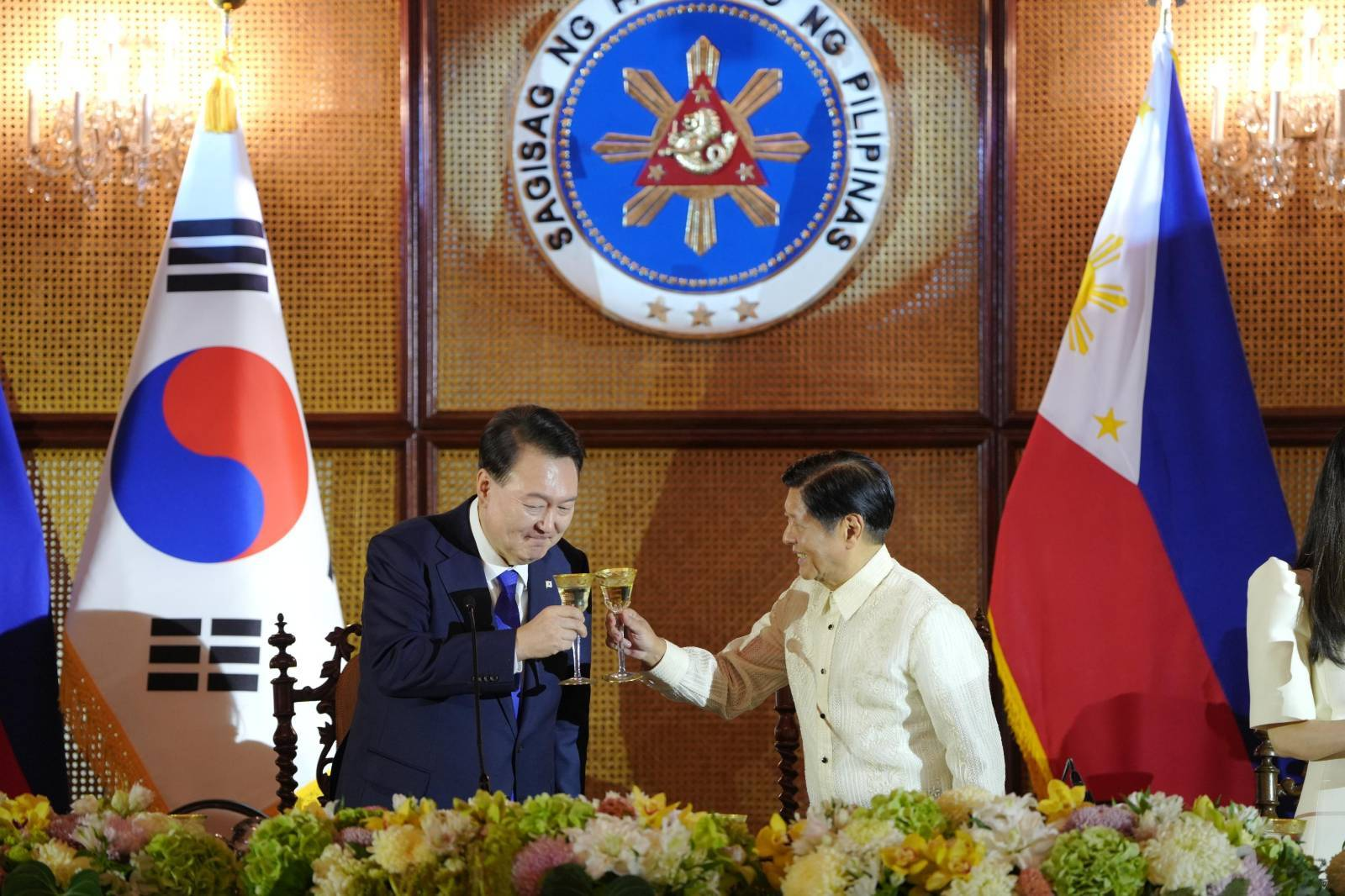
President Bongbong Marcos hosting a state luncheon for South Korean President Yoon Suk Yeol at the Malacañang Palace during the latter's state visit to Manila, October 7, 2024

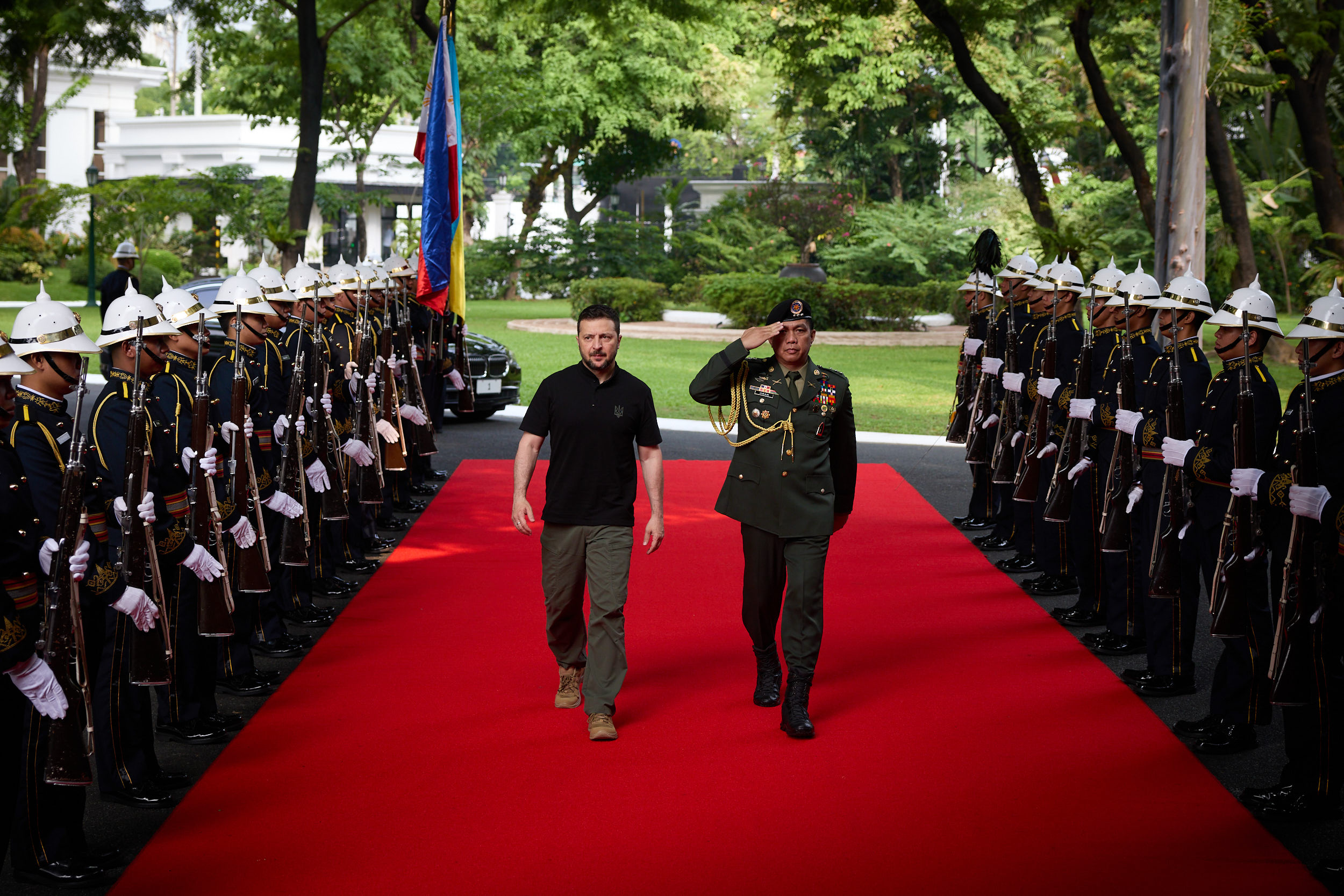
Ukrainian President Volodymyr Zelenskyy is given arrival honors at the Malacañang Palace, June 3, 2024

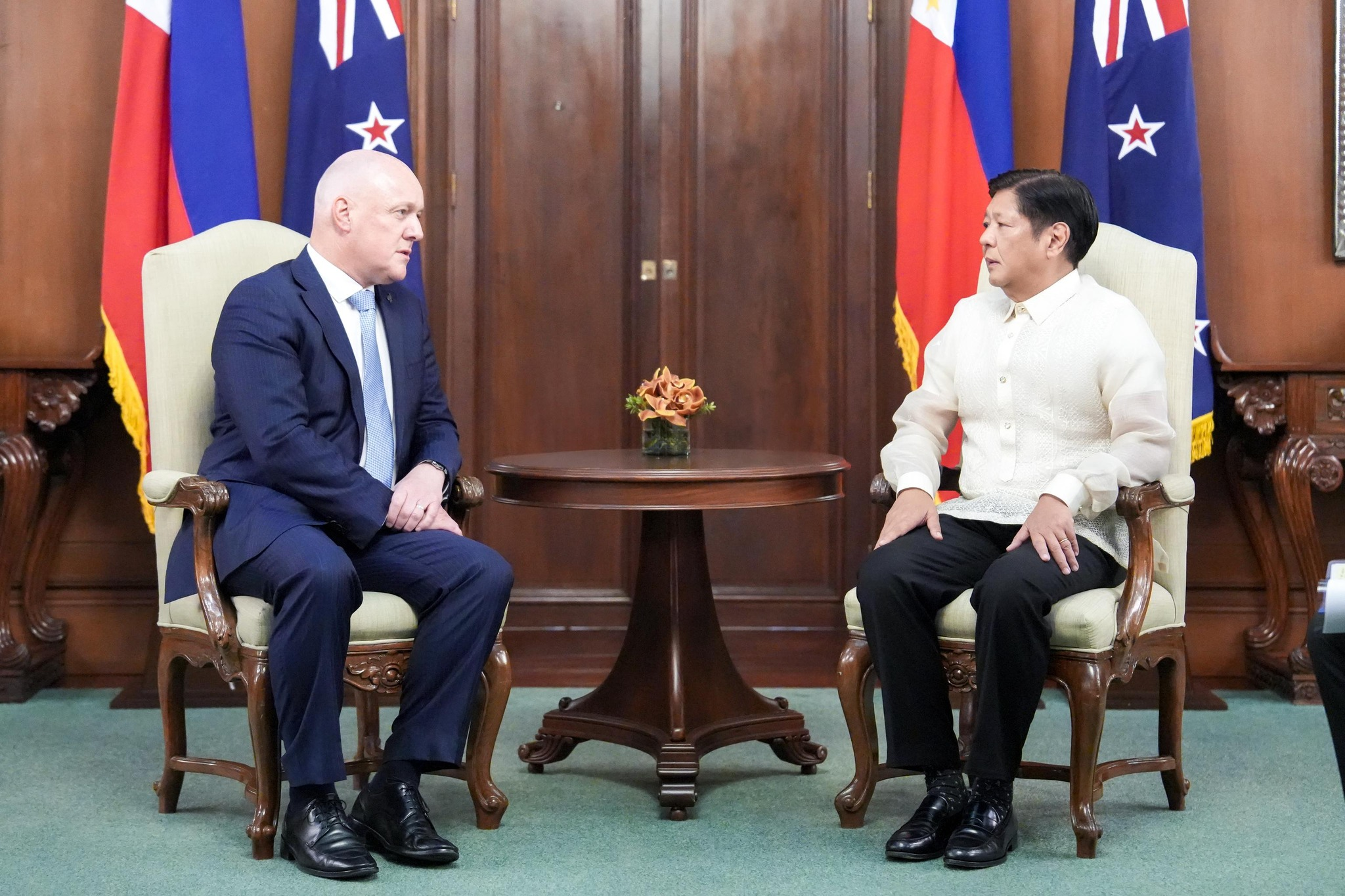
President Bongbong Marcos and New Zealand Prime Minister Christopher Luxon during the latter's visit to Manila, April 18, 2024

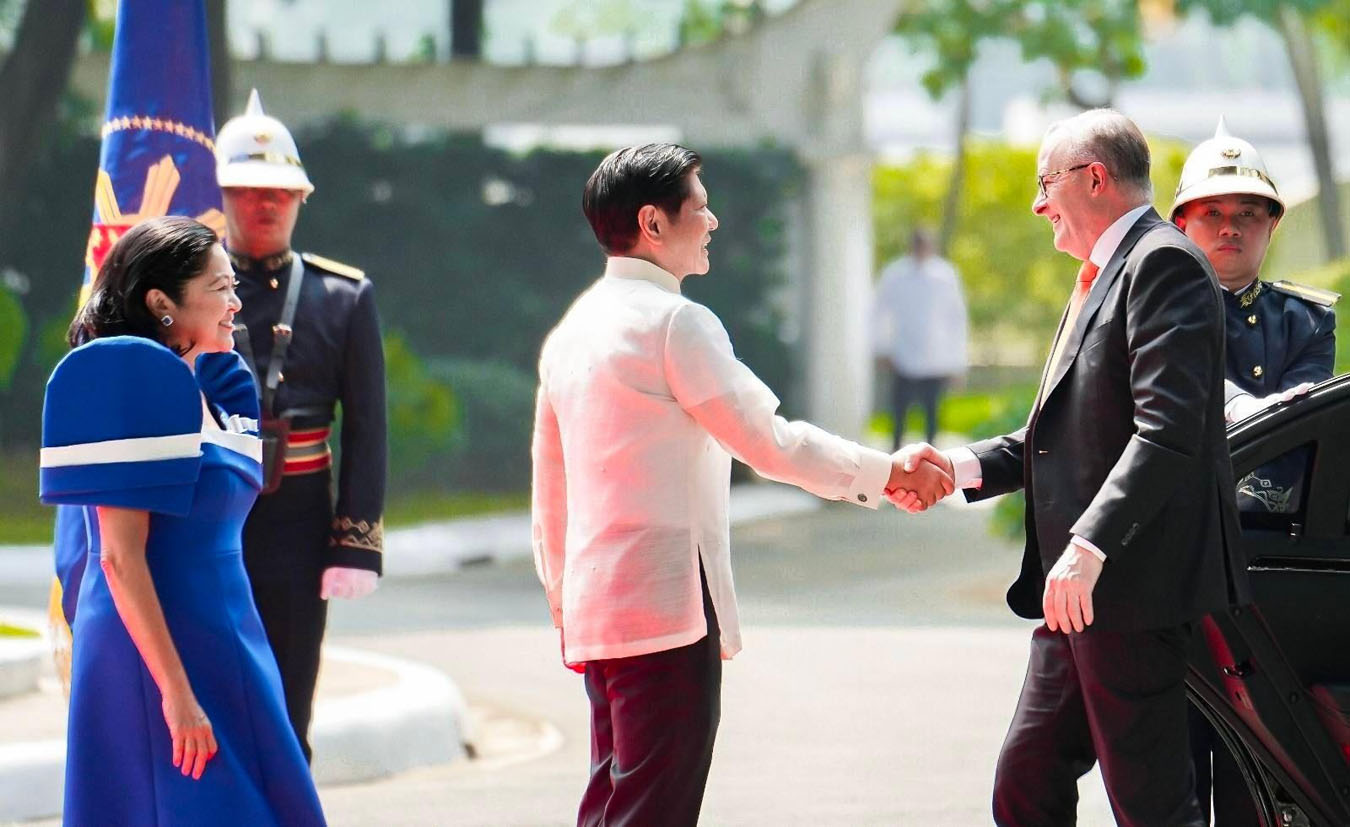
President Bongbong Marcos and First Lady Liza Araneta Marcos welcomes Australian Prime Minister Anthony Albanese to Malacañang Palace, September 8, 2023

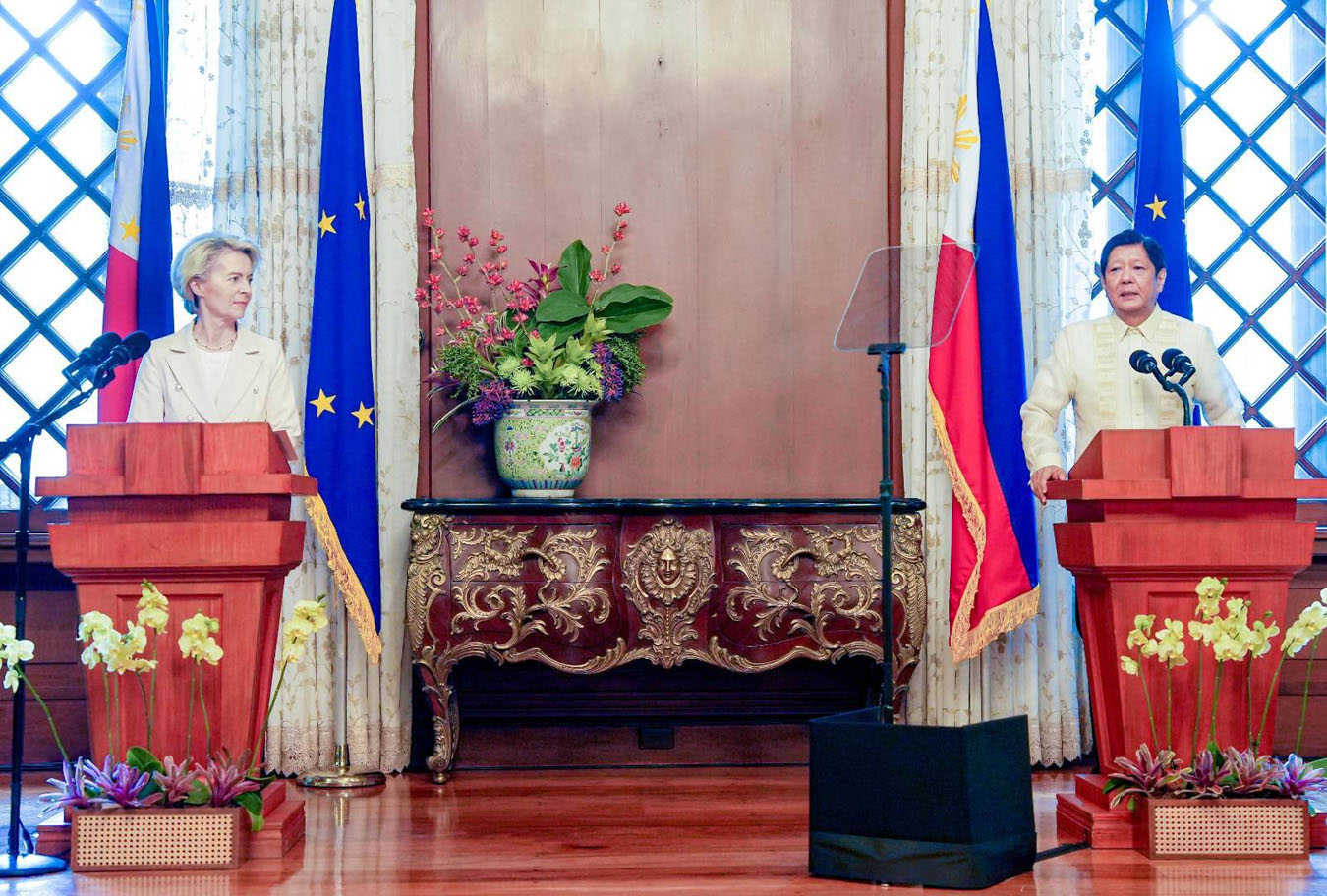
President Bongbong Marcos and EU President of the European Commission Ursula von der Leyen during the latter's official visit to Manila, July 31, 2023

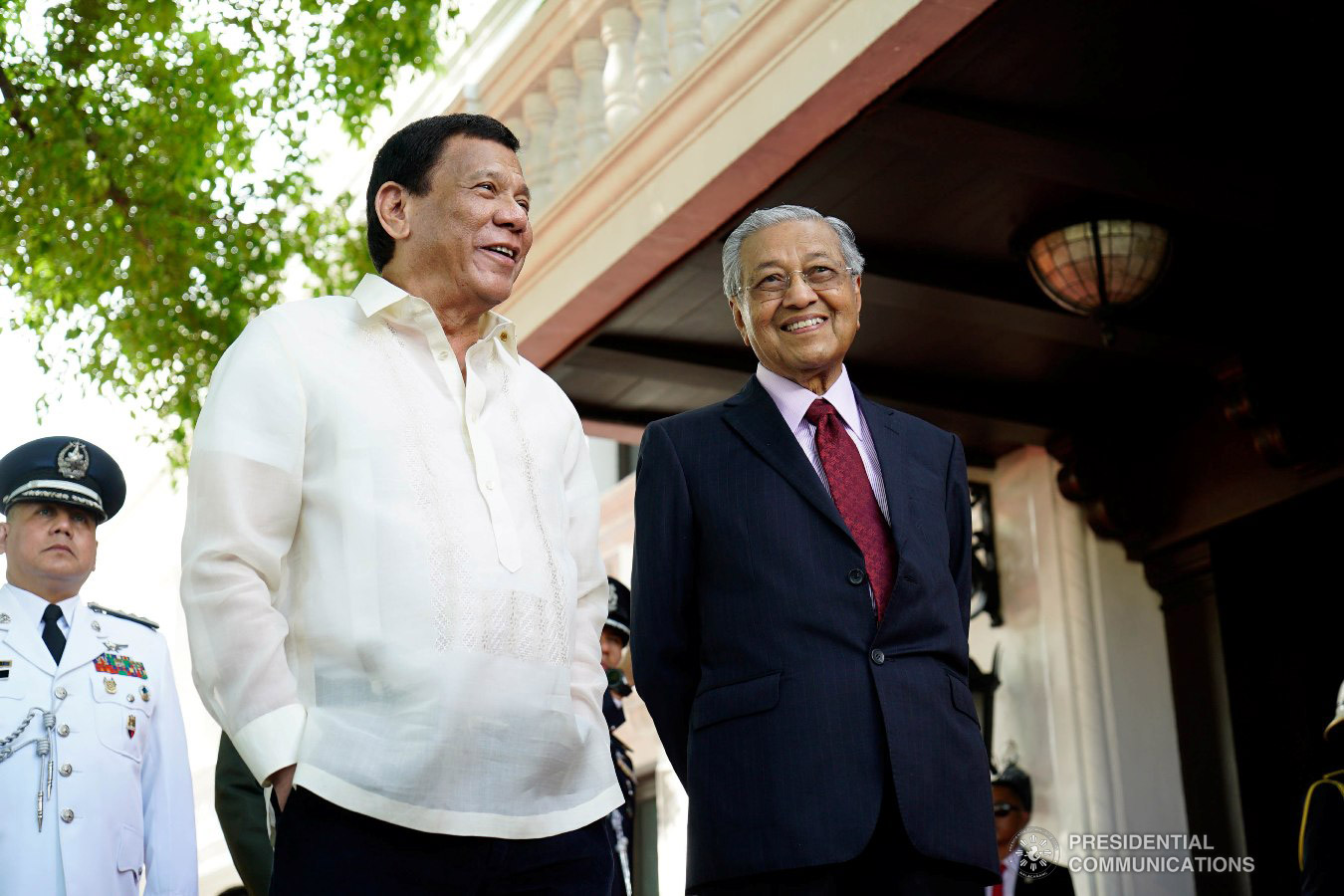
President Rodrigo Duterte shares a light moment with Malaysian Prime Minister Mahathir Mohamad after the latter was accorded arrival honors at the Malacañang Palace on March 7, 2019

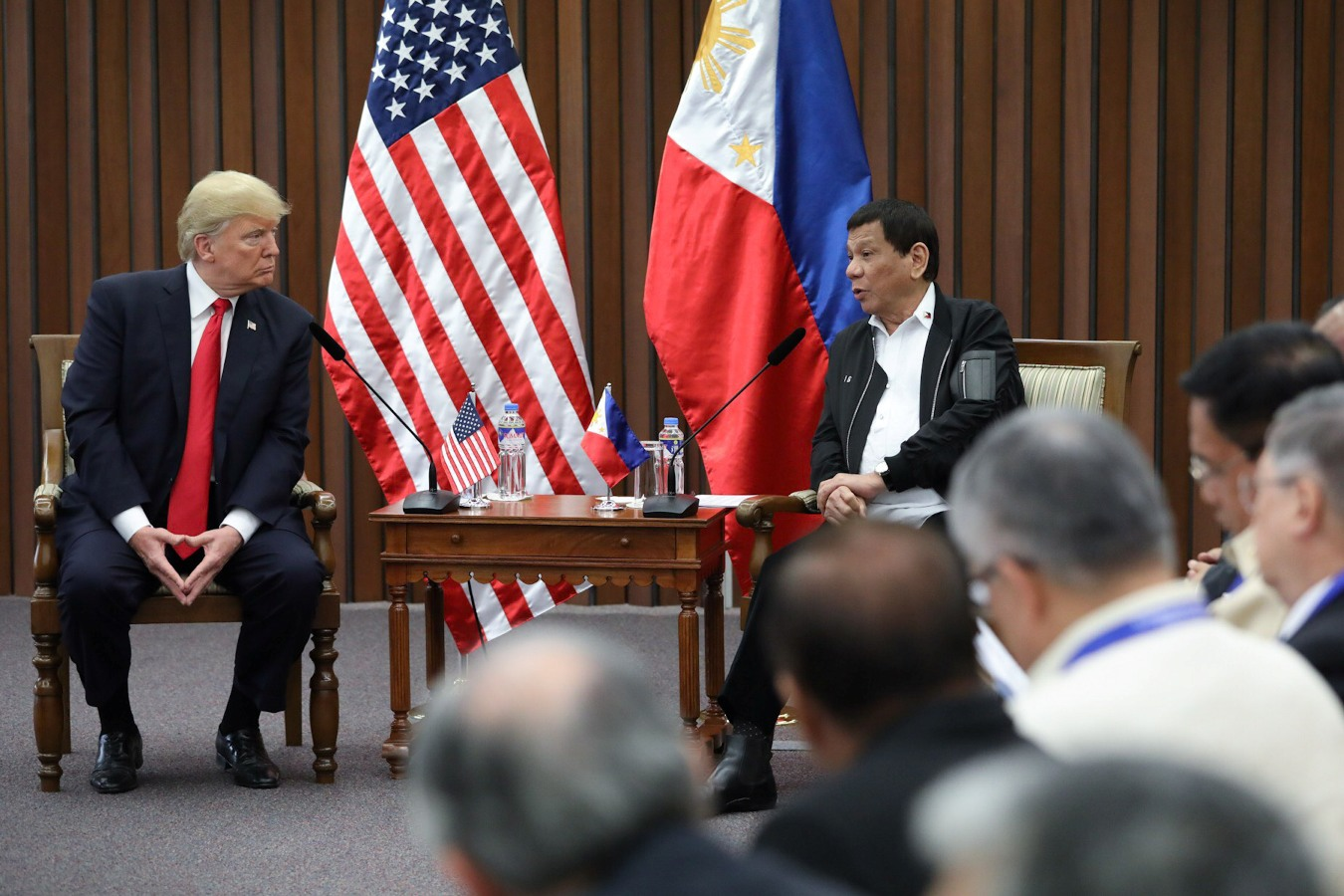
U.S. President Donald Trump meets with President Rodrigo Duterte during the former's official visit to Manila on November 13, 2017

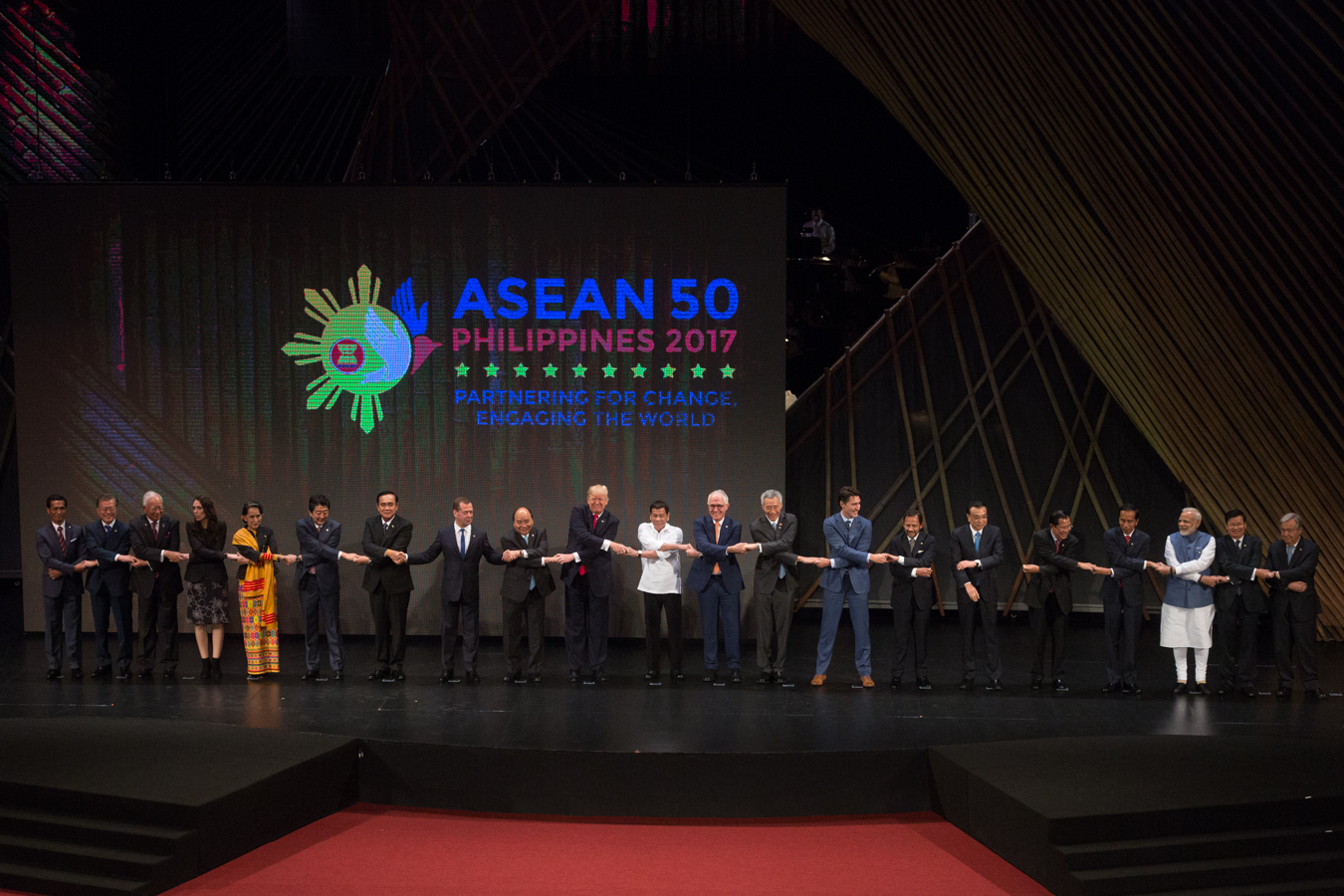
President Rodrigo Duterte chairs the 31st ASEAN Summit on November 13, 2017

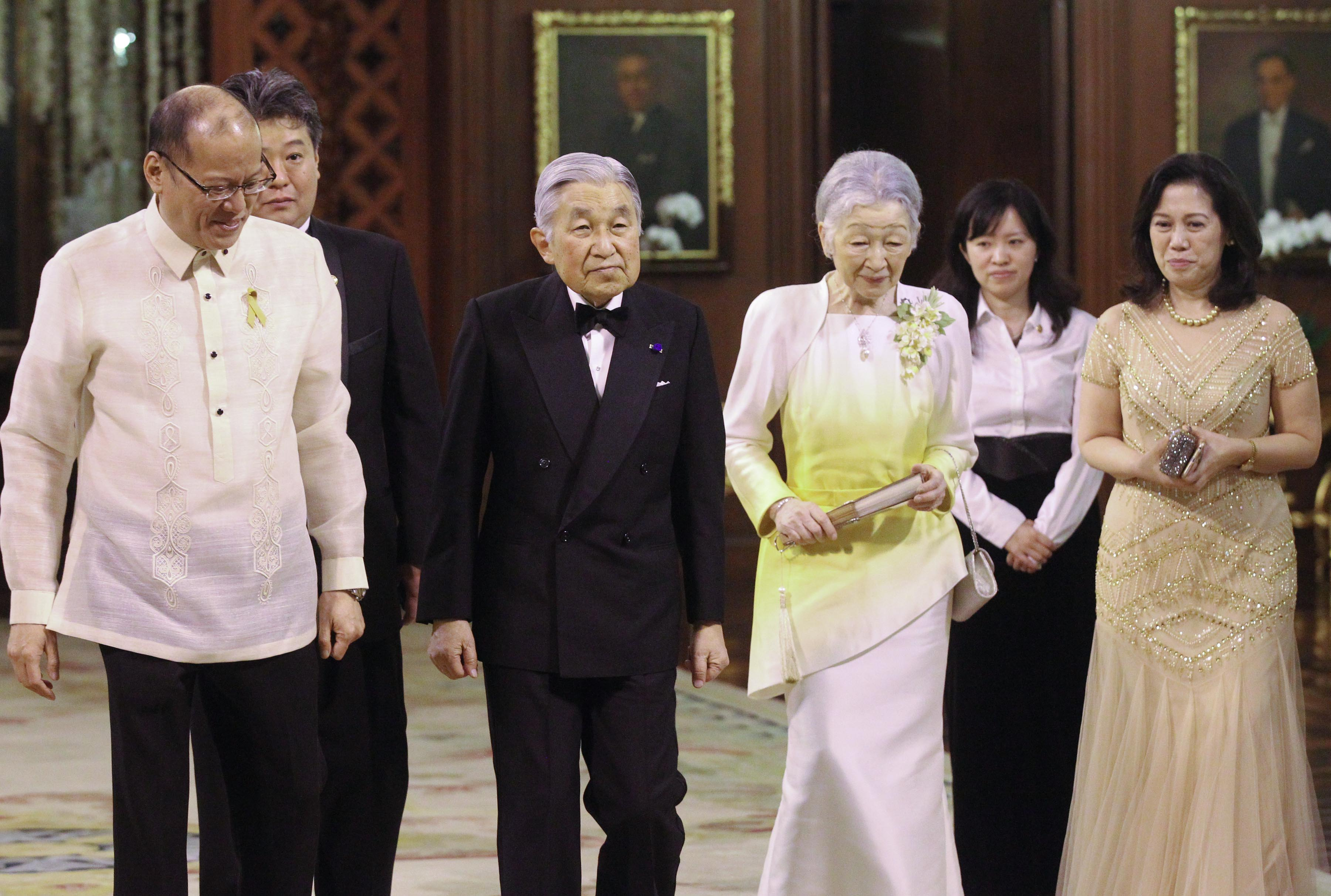
President Benigno Aquino III with Japanese Emperor Akihito and Empress Michiko during their state visit to the Philippines on January 27, 2016

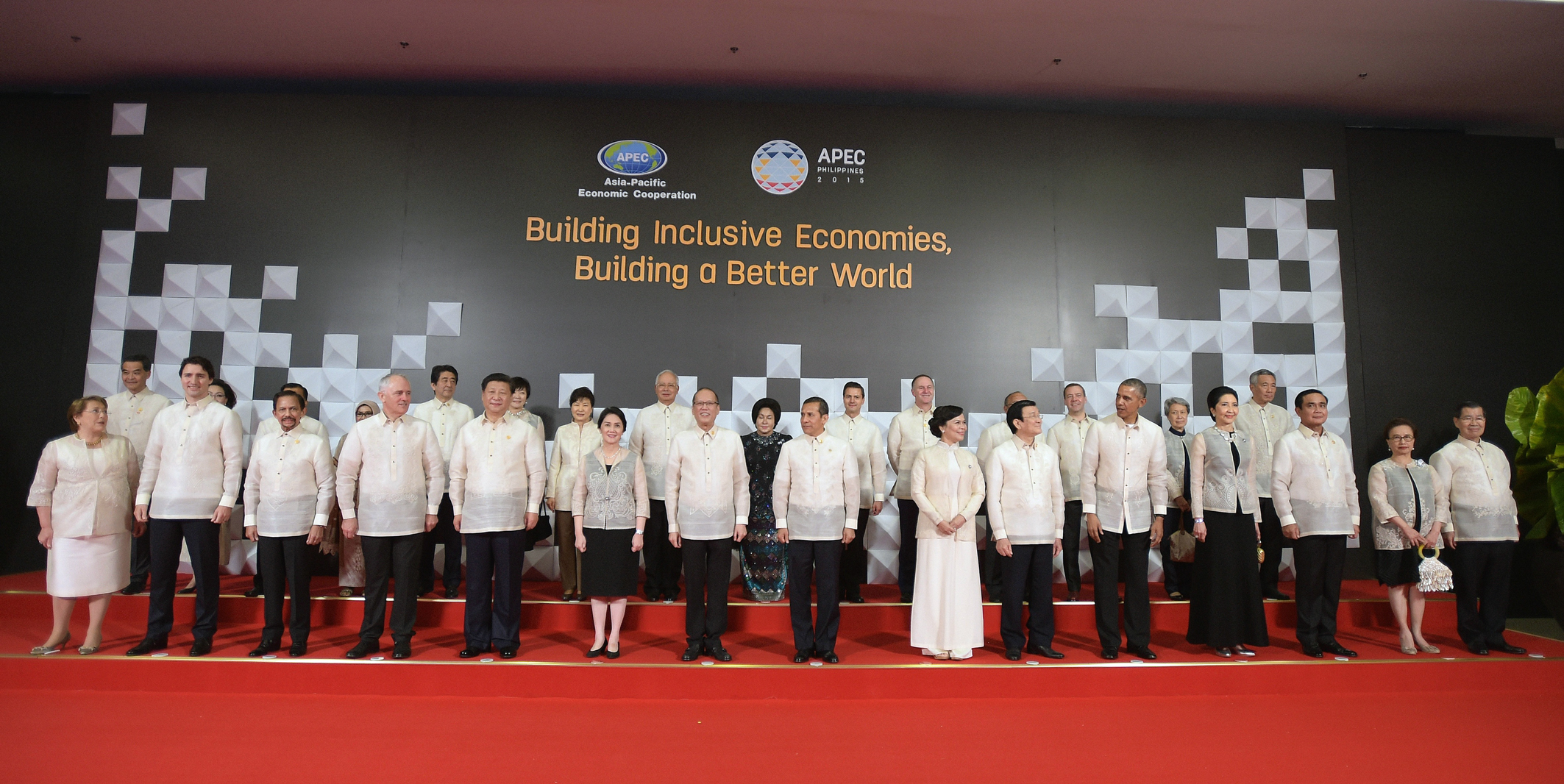
APEC leaders undertake their family photo for the 2015 APEC Economic Leaders' Meeting in Manila, November 19, 2015

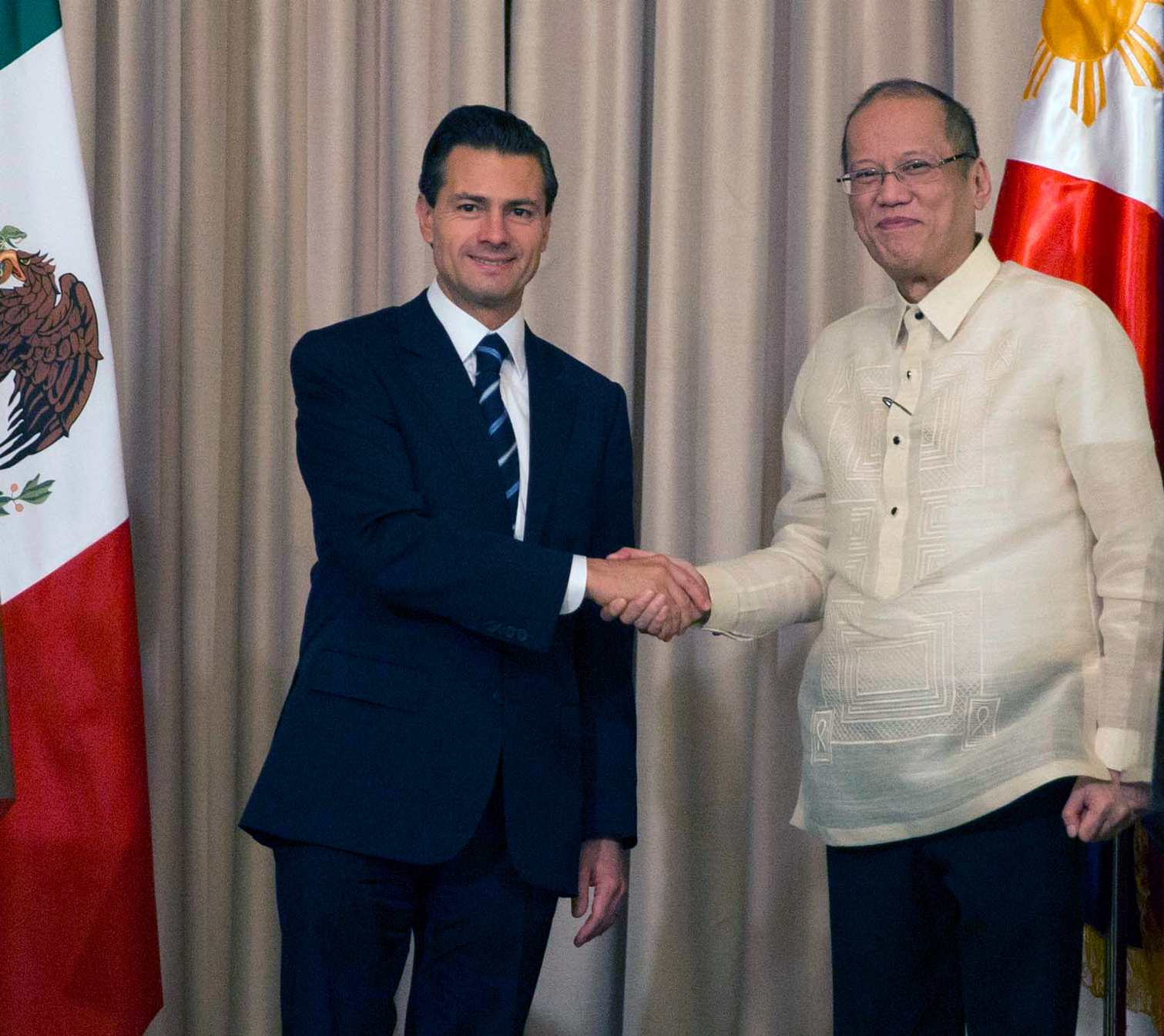
Mexican President Enrique Peña Nieto meeting with President Benigno Aquino III in Manila, November 17, 2015

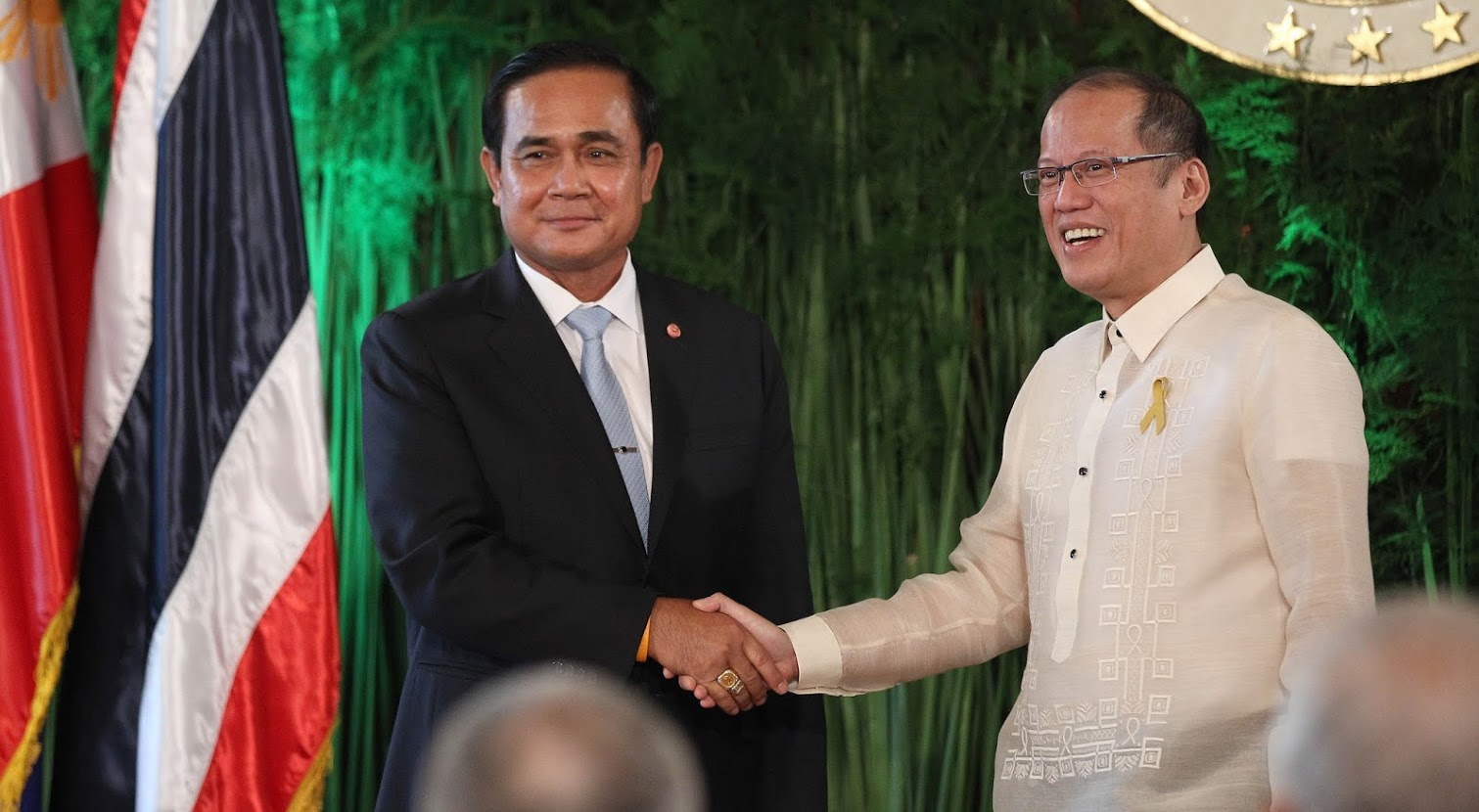
Thai Prime Minister Prayut Chan-o-cha meeting with President Benigno Aquino III in a courtesy call at the Malacañang Palace in Manila, August 28, 2015

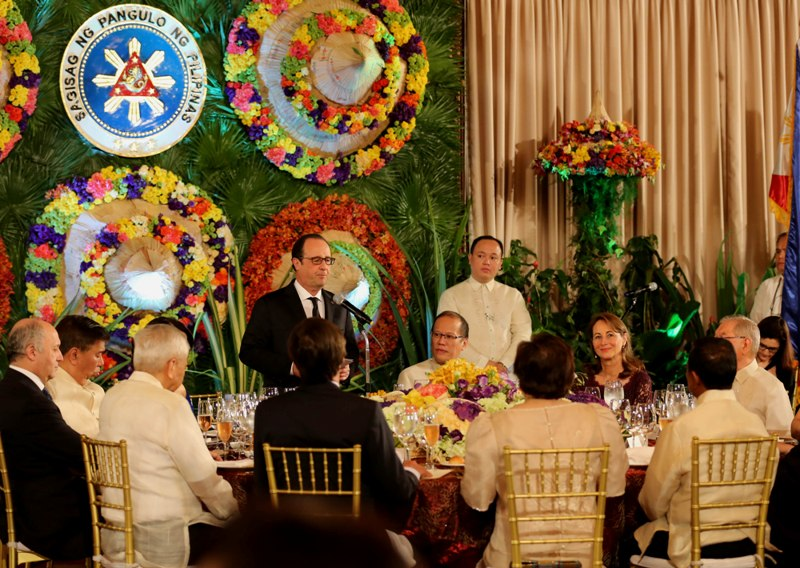
French President François Hollande at a state dinner at the Malacañang Palace in Manila, February 26, 2015

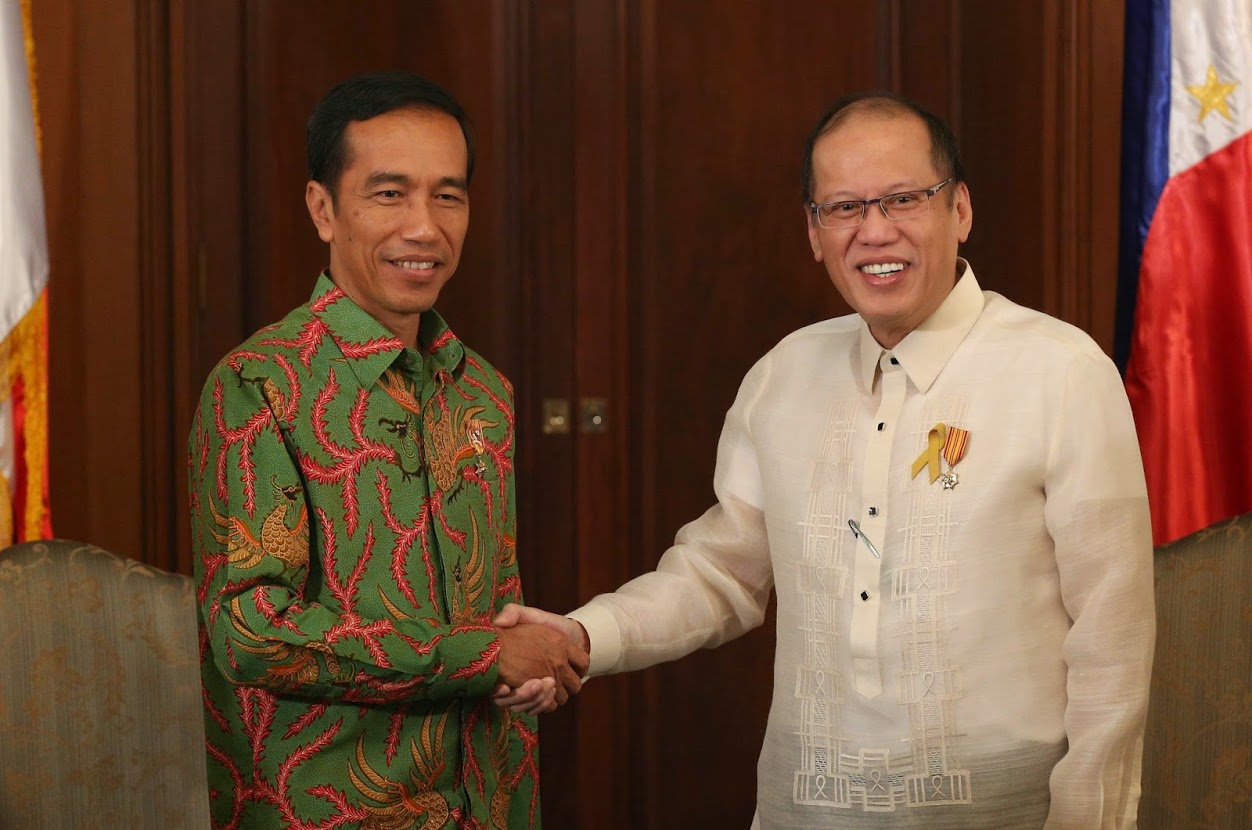
Indonesian President Joko Widodo meeting with President Benigno Aquino III in Manila, February 9, 2015

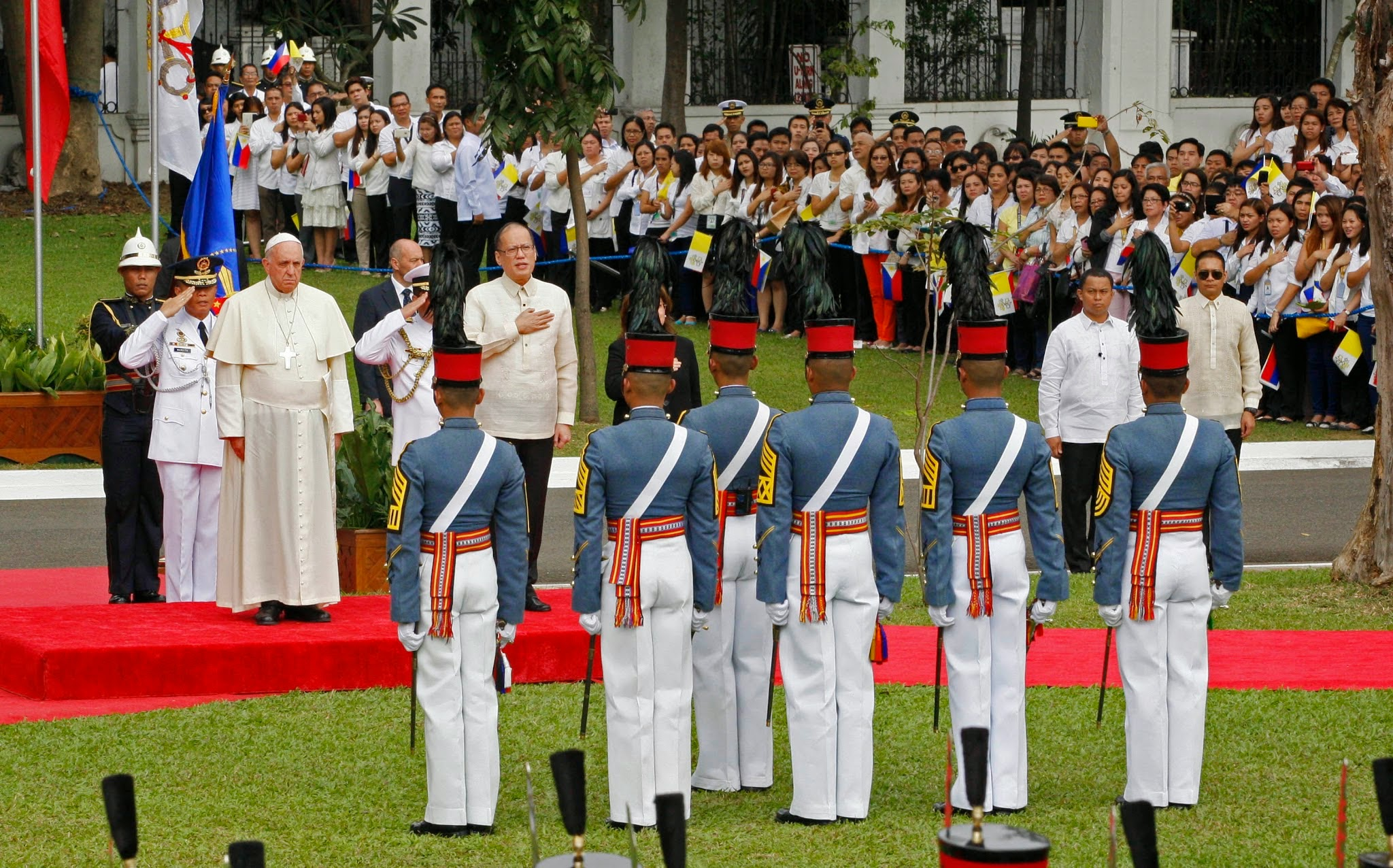
Pope Francis and President Benigno Aquino III during an arrival ceremony at the Malacañang Palace in Manila, January 16, 2015

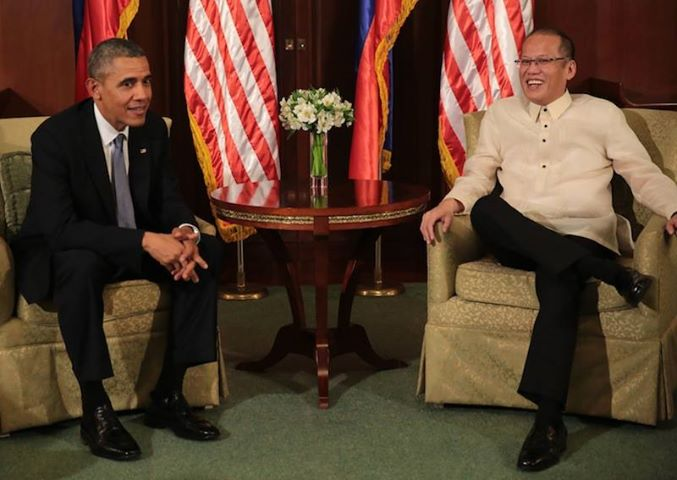
U.S. President Barack Obama meets with President Benigno Aquino III during the former's state visit to Manila, April 28, 2014

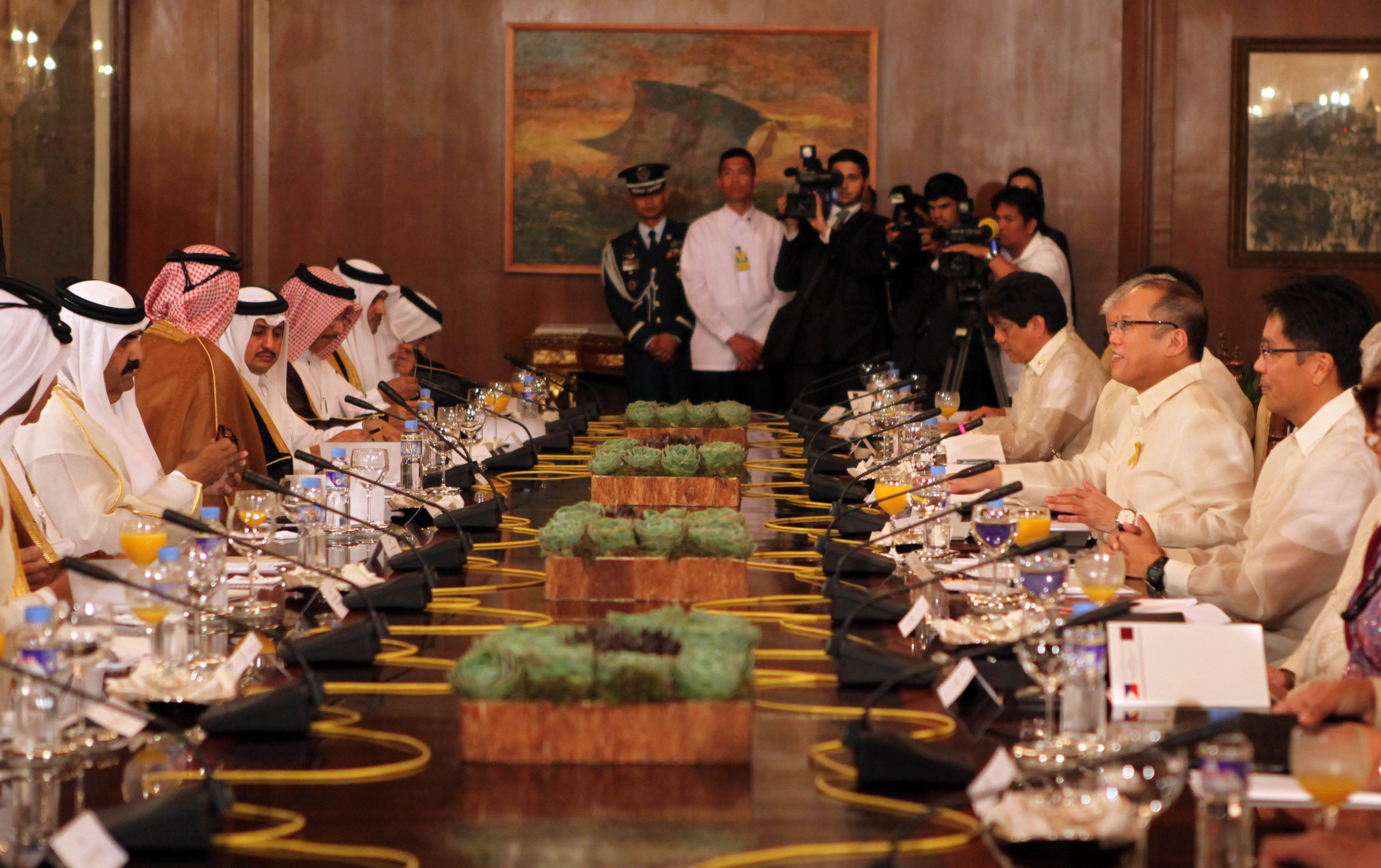
A bilateral meeting between the delegations of President Benigno Aquino III and the visiting Emir Hamad bin Khalifa Al Thani of Qatar at the Malacañang Palace in Manila, August 10, 2012

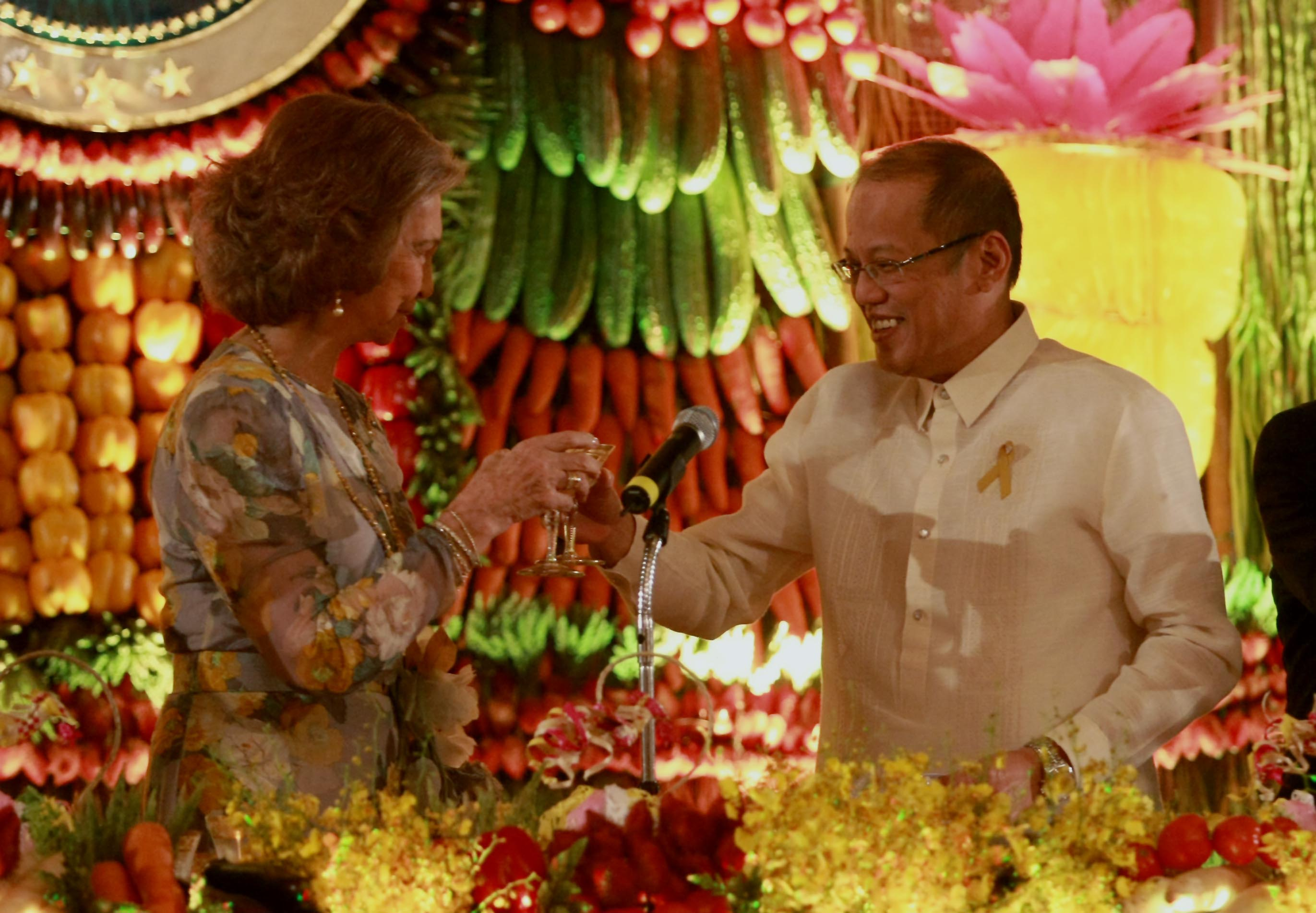
President Benigno Aquino III hosting a state dinner for the visiting Queen Sofía of Spain at the Malacañang Palace in Manila, July 3, 2012

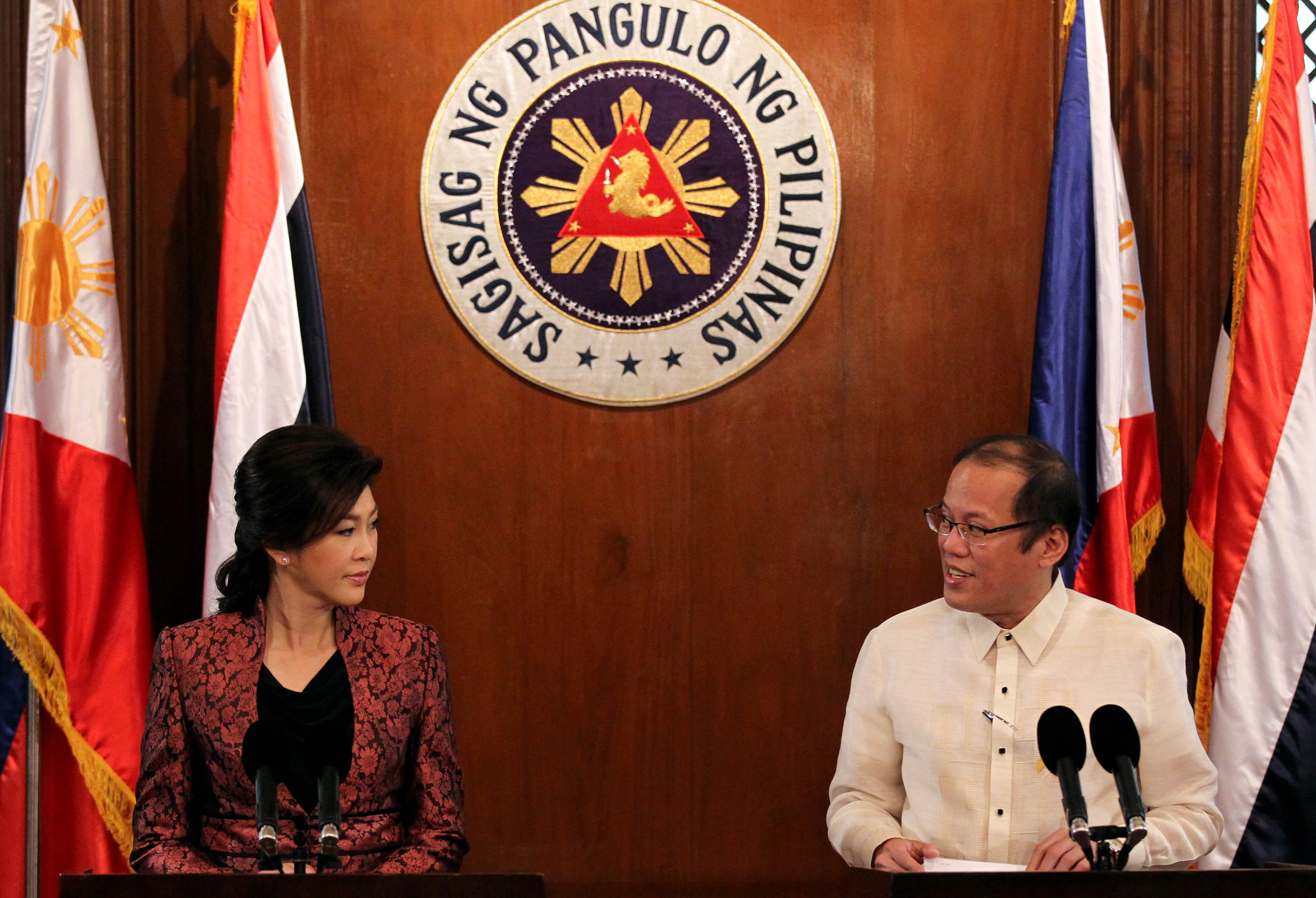
President Benigno Aquino III and Thai Prime Minister Yingluck Shinawatra during the latter's official visit to the Philippines, January 19, 2012

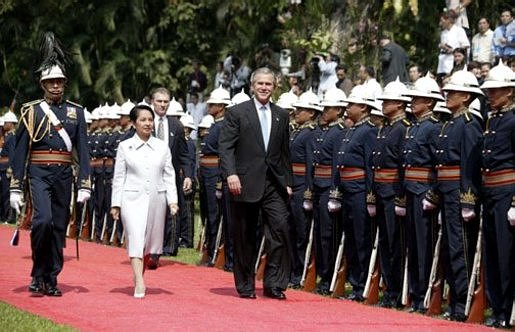
President Gloria Macapagal Arroyo and U.S. President George W. Bush participating at an arrival ceremony at the Malacañang Palace in Manila, October 18, 2003

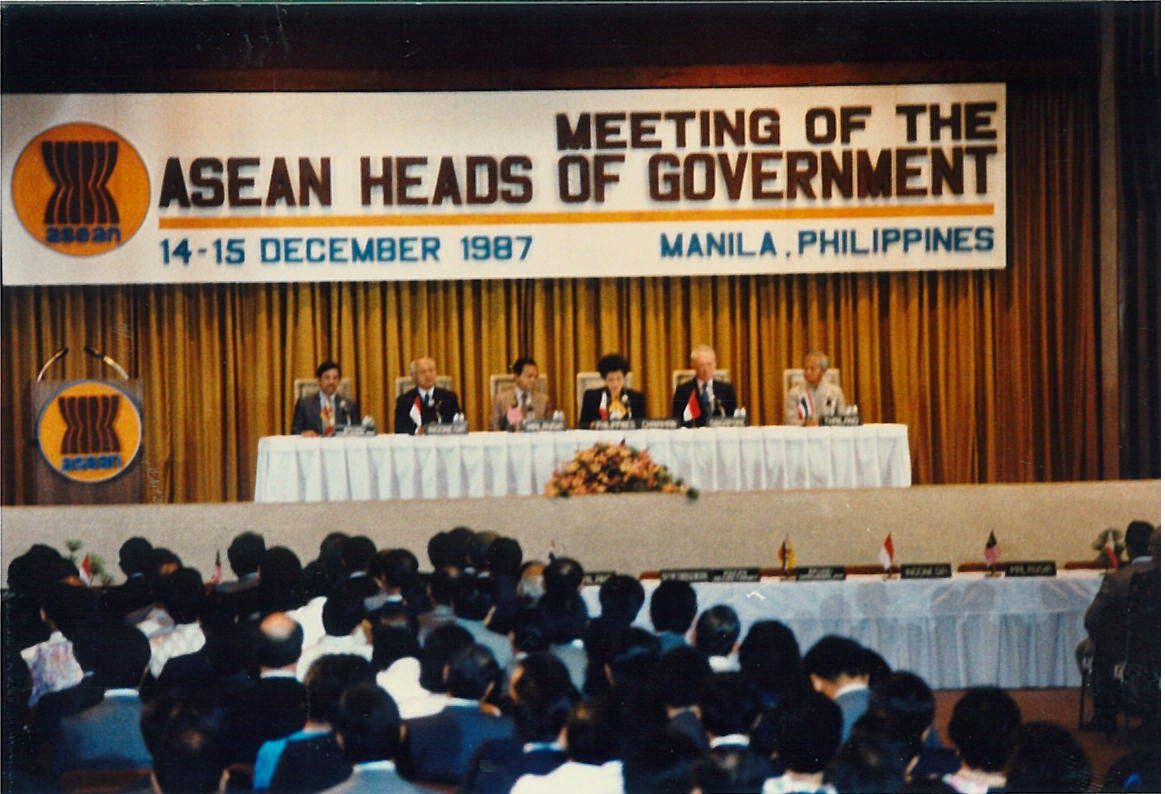
President Corazon Aquino chairs the 3rd ASEAN Summit on December 14, 1987

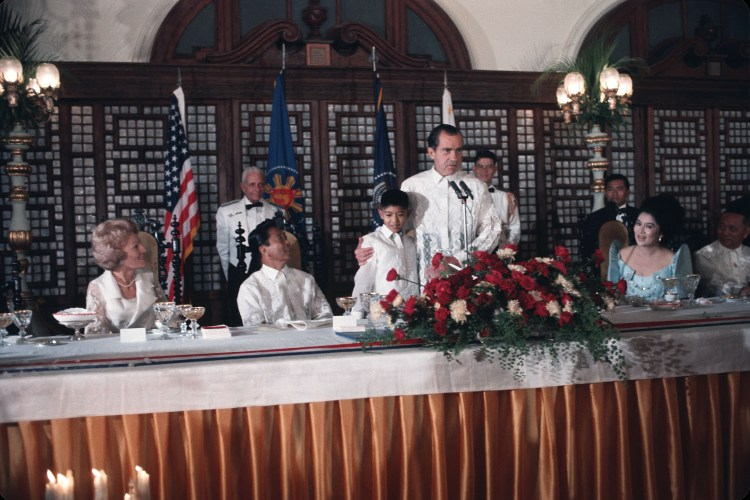
President Ferdinand Marcos and First Lady Imelda Marcos hosting a state dinner for visiting U.S. President Richard Nixon and U.S. First Lady Pat Nixon at the Malacañang Palace in Manila, 1969

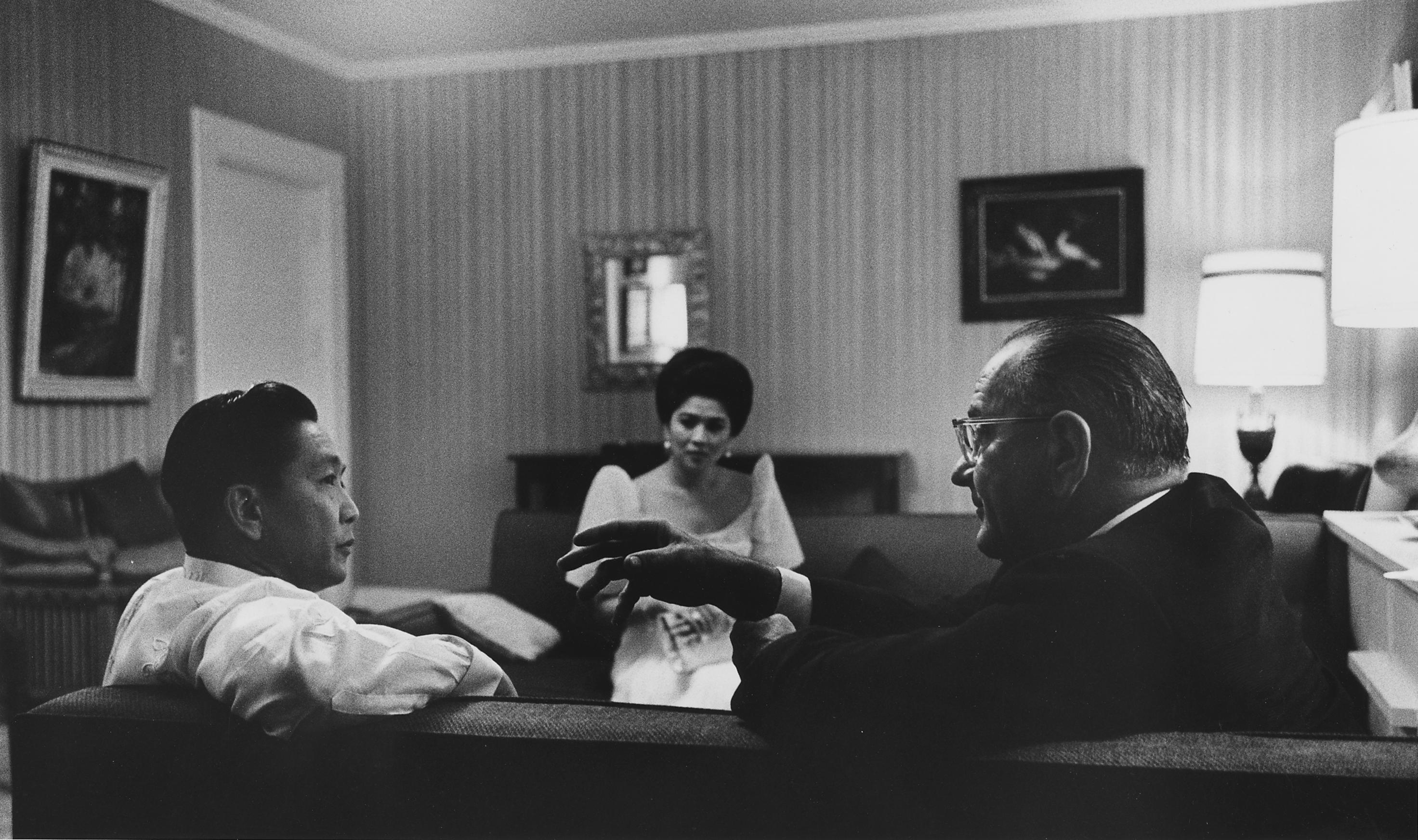
U.S. President Lyndon B. Johnson meeting with the Marcoses in Manila, October 23, 1966

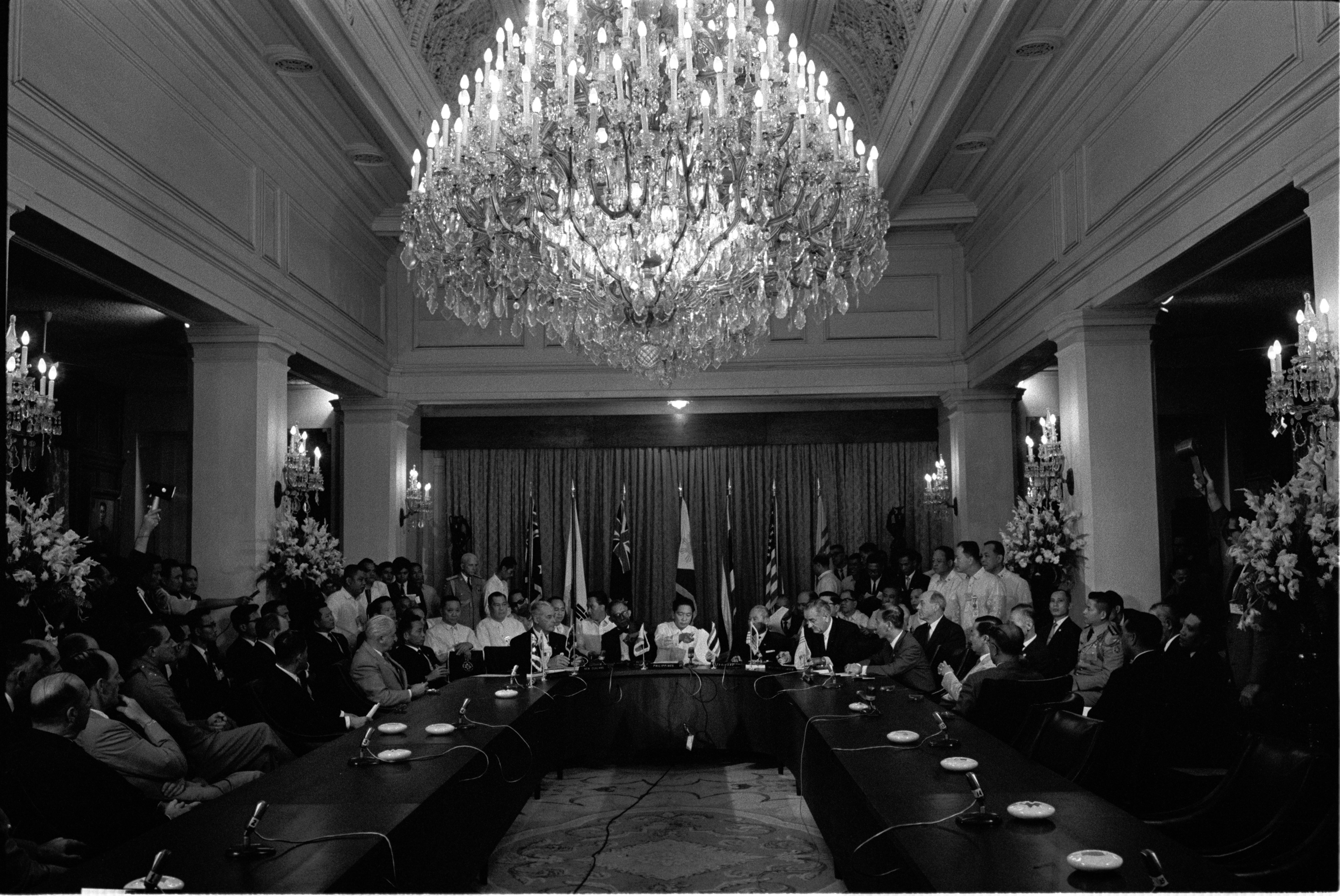
President Marcos hosting the attending leaders of the Manila Summit Conference on the Vietnam War, October 24, 1966

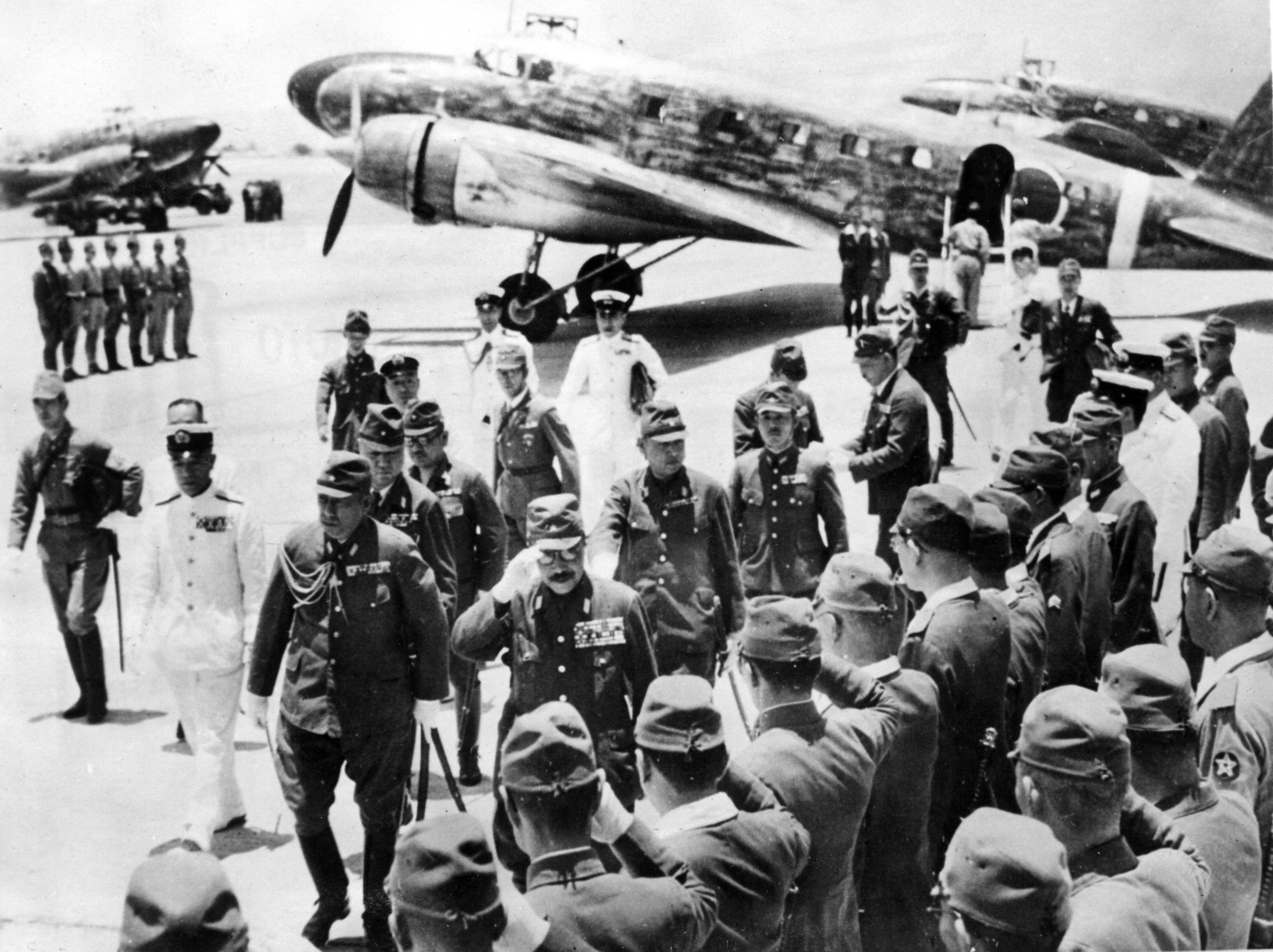
Japanese Prime Minister Hideki Tojo arriving at Nichols Field in Manila for his state visit to the Philippines, May 6, 1943

== See also ==
- List of diplomatic missions in the Philippines
- List of diplomatic missions of the Philippines
- List of international presidential trips made by Gloria Macapagal-Arroyo
- List of international presidential trips made by Benigno Aquino III
- List of international presidential trips made by Rodrigo Duterte
- List of international presidential trips made by Bongbong Marcos

== Bibliography ==
- Ho Khai Leong, Connecting and Distancing: Southeast Asia and China. (Institute of Southeast Asian Studies, 2009). ISBN 978-981-230-857-3
- IBP USA Staff, Philippines Diplomatic Handbook. (International Business Publications USA, 2009). ISBN 1438738803
- Wilairat, Kawin. Singapore's Foreign Policy: The First Decade. (Institute of Southeast Asian Studies, 1975). ISBN 978-981-4376-47-1
