= List of ambassadors of the Philippines to Brunei =

Ambassador of the Republic of the Philippines to Brunei Darussalam
- Sugo ng Republika ng Pilipinas sa Brunei Darussalam; Duta Besar Republik Filipina ke Negara Brunei Darussalam
- Seal of the Department of Foreign Affairs of the Philippines

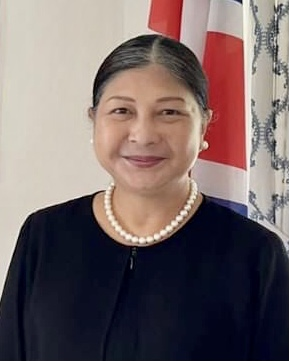
- Incumbent; Marian Jocelyn R. Tirol-Ignacio since May 24, 2022
- Department of Foreign Affairs; Embassy of the Philippines, Bandar Seri Begawan
- Style: His/Her Excellency
- Reports to: Department of Foreign Affairs
- Seat: Bandar Seri Begawan, Brunei
- Nominator: Secretary of Foreign Affairs
- Appointer: President of the Philippines; with the advice and consent of the Commission on Appointments
- Term length: No fixed term
- Inaugural holder: Tristan V. Enverga
- Formation: August 10, 1983
- Website: Philippine Embassy, Bandar Seri Begawan

The ambassador of the Republic of the Philippines to Brunei Darussalam (Filipino: Sugo ng Republika ng Pilipinas sa Brunei Darussalam; Malay: Duta Besar Republik Filipina ke Negara Brunei Darussalam) is the Republic of the Philippines' foremost diplomatic representative in the Sultanate of Brunei. As head of the Philippines' diplomatic mission there, the ambassador is the official representative of the president and the government of the Philippines to the sultan and government of Brunei. The position has the rank and status of an ambassador extraordinary and plenipotentiary.

== List of representatives ==
=== Ambassadors ===
Head of mission	Tenure	Note(s)
Tristan V. Enverga	August 10, 1983 – March 14, 1984	The first and only Philippine consul general to Brunei.
Benjamin B. Domingo	March 14, 1984 − November 1, 1986	
Eusebio A. Abaquin	December 16, 1986 − June 19, 1993)	
Juan V. Saez	November 29, 1993 − September 25, 1994	
Ramon A. Tirol	March 9, 1995 − June 30, 1998	
Enrique A. Zaldivar	March 16, 1999 − March 31, 2002	
Virginia H. Benavidez	April 24, 2002 − June 30, 2009	First Filipina diplomat to become ambassador to Brunei.
Alexander B. Yano	July 28, 2009 − June 30, 2010	
Nestor Z. Ochoa	March 25, 2011 – May 2015	
Meynardo Montealegre	April 21, 2015 – May 30, 2018	Credentials were presented on May 21, 2015.
Christopher B. Montero	May 27, 2019 – August 31, 2021	Credentials were presented on September 18, 2019.
Marian Jocelyn R. Tirol-Ignacio	May 24, 2022 – present	Credentials were presented on May 24, 2022.

=== Chargés d'affaires ===
Head of mission	Tenure	Note(s)
Virginia H. Benavidez	June 20, 1986 – November 28, 1993; September 26, 1994 – March 8, 1995; July 1, 1998 – March 15, 1999	
Celeste Vinzon-Balatbat	July 1 – 28, 2009; July 1, 2010 – March 24, 2011	
Pete Raymond V. Delfin	May 2018 – May 27, 2019	

== See also ==
- Brunei–Philippines relations
