= Embassy of the Philippines, Bandar Seri Begawan =

Diplomatic mission of the Philippines in Brunei

Embassy of the Philippines, Bandar Seri Begawan Pasuguan ng Pilipinas sa Bandar Seri Begawan Kedutaan Filipina di Bandar Seri Begawan

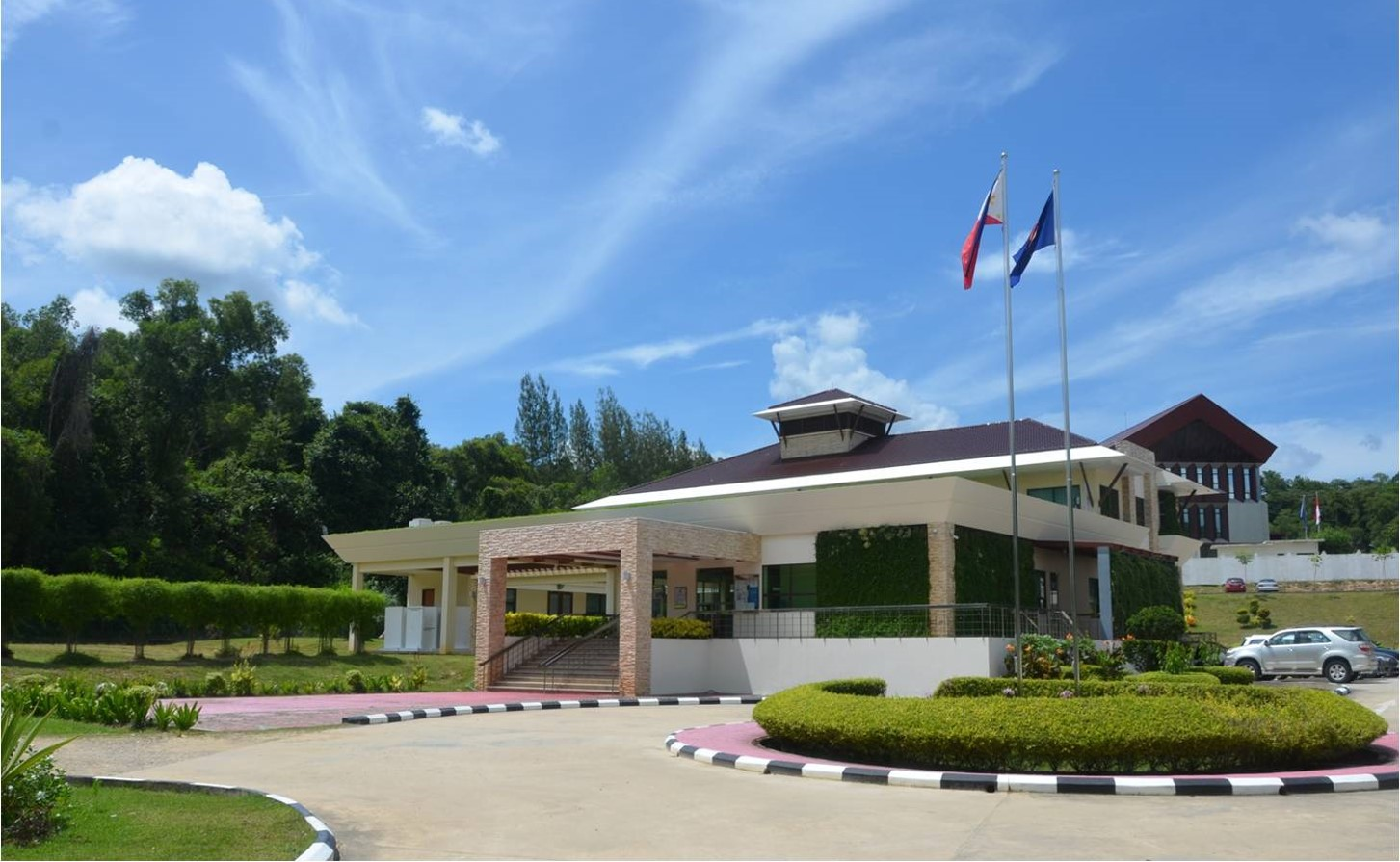
- Location: Bandar Seri Begawan
- Address: Simpang 336, Diplomatic Enclave, Jalan Kebangsaan
- Coordinates: 4°55′24.3″N 114°57′27.1″E
- Ambassador: Christopher B. Montero
- Website: http://www.philippine-embassybrunei.com

The Embassy of the Philippines in Bandar Seri Begawan is the diplomatic mission of the Republic of the Philippines to the Sultanate of Brunei. Opened in 1984 after Brunei gained independence from the United Kingdom, it is currently located in the Diplomatic Enclave of Bandar Seri Begawan, behind the offices of the country's Ministry of Culture, Youth and Sports.

== History ==
A Philippine diplomatic presence in Brunei was established in 1984, immediately after the Philippines recognized Bruneian independence from the United Kingdom. The Philippine Embassy at the time was located at 473 Kampong Pelambayan in Mukim Kota Batu, and was located there until it relocated to the fourth and fifth floors of the Badi'ah Complex on Jalan Tutong on February 14, 1989, mostly due to complaints that the old location was not easily accessible by public transport.

On August 14, 2002, the Philippine Embassy moved down the street to its own compound on 17 Simpang 126, Km 2, Jalan Tutong, with the embassy vacating its old offices by 2003. While the embassy was headquartered there, Foreign Affairs Secretary Blas Ople planted a mango tree on the embassy grounds in honor of Virginia H. Benavidez, who as ambassador at the time became not only the first female head of the Brunei mission, but also became the mission's longest-serving diplomat.

In 2009, coinciding with the celebration of the 25th anniversary of Philippine-Bruneian ties, it was announced that a new Philippine Embassy chancery will be constructed on a 1.1744-hectare (2.902-acre) lot in Bandar Seri Begawan's newly designated Diplomatic Enclave, the first diplomatic mission to relocate to the district. Construction of the new chancery began on April 16, 2010, and the new building was inaugurated by President Benigno Aquino III during his state visit to Brunei on June 2, 2011. Operations at the new building began two months later on August 2, 2011.

== Building ==
The new chancery of the Philippine Embassy was built at cost of $2.5 million, and is the first building that visitors will see upon entering the Diplomatic Enclave. Designed by Felino Palafox, Jr. and built by Bruneian contractor Wong Sie Sing (WSS) Sdn Bhd, the two-story building is LEED-compliant, with no security fences surrounding the building. The building's design, which takes into account Islamic aesthetic forms, was inspired by the nipa hut, combined with various forms from Asian architectural styles. Then-Consul General Raymond Balatbat, meanwhile, remarked that the building's design will combine form and function, as well as openness, security and Filipino hospitality.

A number of energy-saving elements are designed into the building's architecture. These include a green roof to dissipate heat, high ceilings to allow entry of natural light, and a room arrangement that allows for as much intake of natural light as possible. The building is arranged along an east-west axis to minimize direct sunlight exposure, and areas which are directly exposed to sunlight have sun buffers installed to mitigate the harsh rays of the sun.

The building's walls are primarily green, which represents hope and growth, and is also the color of Islam. Antique mirrors are also installed throughout the building as a symbol of the rich culture of Islamic countries, and the building's centerpiece is a teardrop-shaped crystal chandelier which represents Brunei's major export, oil.

The embassy's front-line offices in Brunei are all located on the first floor in order to make them as accessible to the public as possible. Offices which occupy the first floor include the Consular Section, the Assistance to Nationals Section, the Philippine Overseas Labor Office, and the Brunei offices of the Overseas Workers Welfare Administration (OWWA) and the Home Development Mutual Fund (Pag-IBIG Fund). A social hall and a sports hall will also be built on the embassy grounds as part of the second phase of the chancery's construction.

== Staff and activities ==
The Philippine Embassy in Bandar Seri Begawan is currently headed by Ambassador Christopher B. Montero, who had been appointed to the position by President Rodrigo Duterte on January 23, 2019. Prior to becoming Ambassador, Montero, a career diplomat, was deployed to the Philippine Embassy in Phnom Penh, where he served as Ambassador to Cambodia. His appointment was confirmed by the Commission on Appointments on February 9, 2019, and he presented his credentials to Sultan Hassanal Bolkiah on September 18, 2019.

The embassy's activities center around providing to the needs and welfare of the large community of Overseas Filipino Workers and other Filipinos in Brunei, such as coordinating with the Bruneian government to mandate raises in the salaries of Filipino domestic helpers in the country, as well as providing training to local OFWs. In addition to its labor functions, it has also worked in facilitating the furthering of cultural and economic ties between the Philippines and Brunei. These include hosting art exhibits by Filipino artists, organizing Filipino language classes, and encouraging Bruneian businesses to set up shop in Zamboanga City.

In 2011, OFWs in Brunei published a petition in the Philippine Star, criticizing the embassy and other agencies of the Philippine government for imposing burdensome requirements that they say were tantamount to abuse.

== See also ==
- Brunei–Philippines relations
- List of diplomatic missions of the Philippines
