= List of international presidential trips made by Rodrigo Duterte =

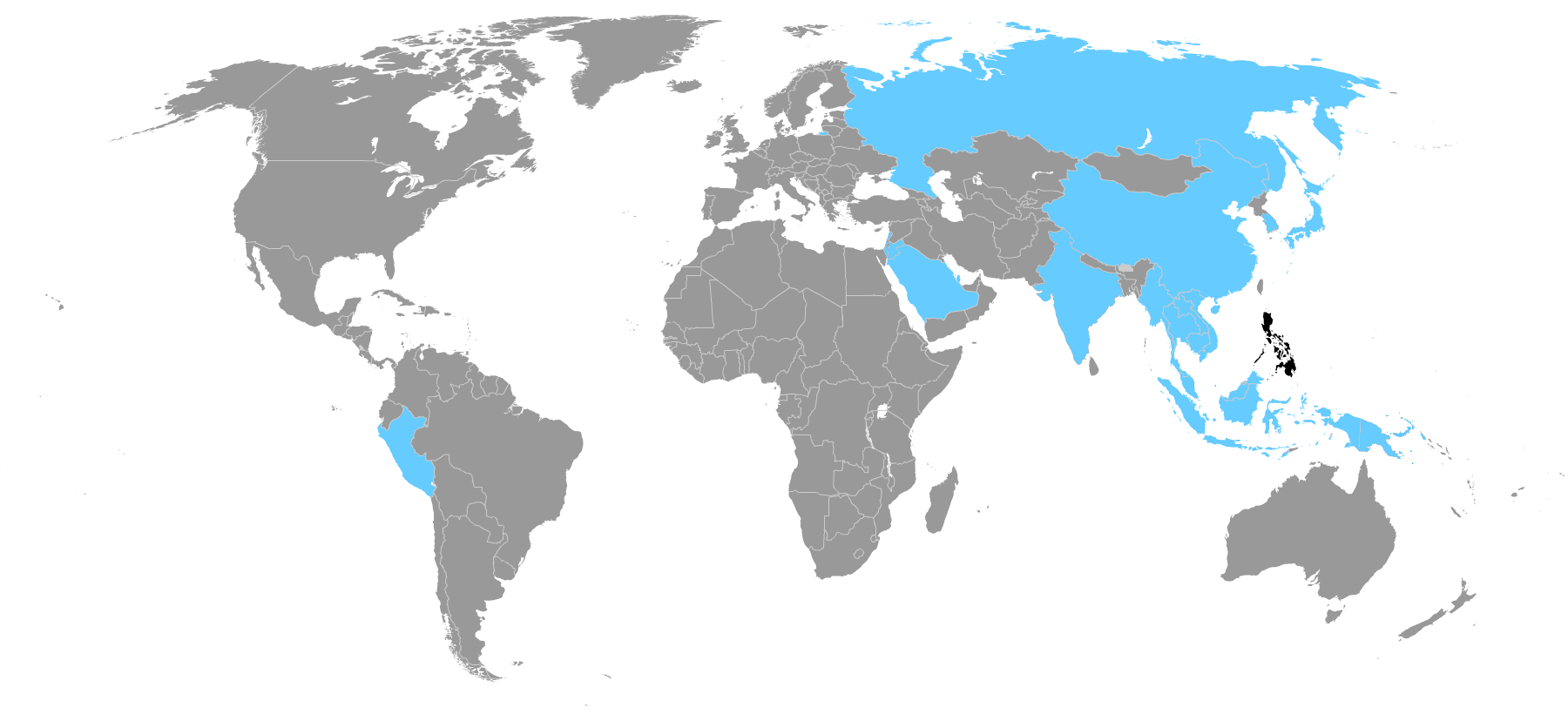
World map highlighting countries visited by Rodrigo Duterte during his presidency, as of June 2019.

This article documents a list of international presidential trips made by Rodrigo Duterte, the 16th president of the Philippines. During his presidency, which began with his inauguration on June 30, 2016 and ended on June 30, 2022, Rodrigo Duterte made 21 international trips to 20 countries internationally (with the exception of technical stopovers).

According to the Official Gazette, international trips made by the president of the Philippines are an opportunity to "foster and maintain" relations with other governments and to meet other heads of state and/or government. The Department of Foreign Affairs classifies these trips as either a state visit, an official visit, or a working visit.

== Countries ==
The number of visits per country where he travelled are:

- One visit to Bahrain, India, Israel, Jordan, Laos, Myanmar, New Zealand, Papua New Guinea, Peru, Qatar, Saudi Arabia, and the United Arab Emirates
- Two visits to Brunei, Cambodia, Indonesia, Malaysia, Russia, South Korea, and Vietnam
- Three visits to Singapore
- Four visits to Thailand and Japan
- Five visits to China (Hong Kong)

== 2016 ==
In his first year in office, President Duterte made seven international trips to eleven different countries. The following were the international trips made by him as president in 2016:

=== Laos and Indonesia (September 5–9) ===
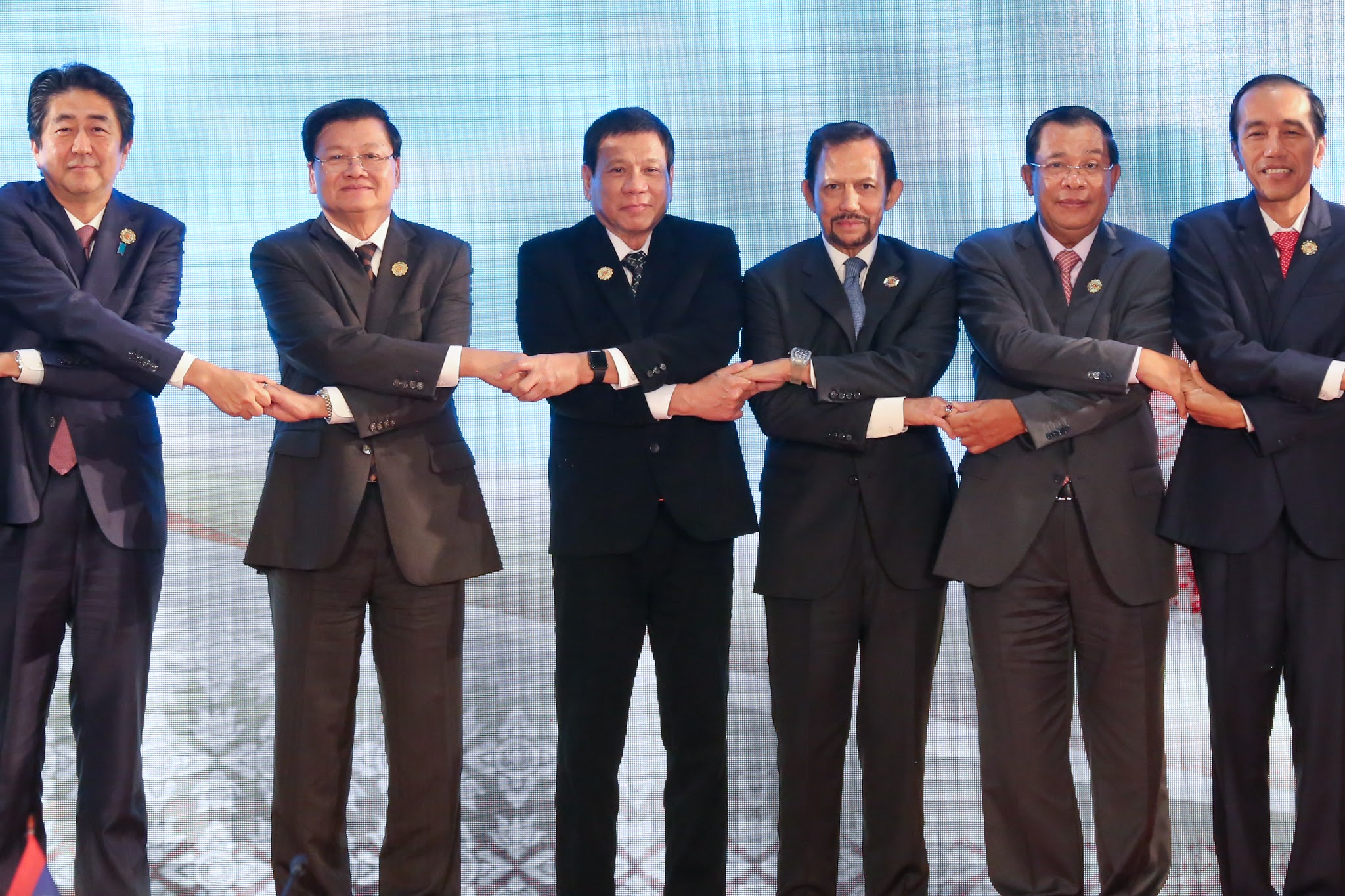
Duterte joins other ASEAN heads of government, holding hands as a symbol of unity, at the ASEAN Summit in Vientiane, September 7, 2016

Duterte's first international trip as president was in Vientiane, Laos. He attended the 28th and 29th Association of Southeast Asian Nations (ASEAN) Summits and the Eleventh East Asia Summit. On September 5, after arriving in Vientiane, Duterte met with the Filipino community in Laos. In his remarks, he assured them of his administration's pursuit of a "clean government" that would address crime and corruption, and explained their campaign against illegal drugs. On the sidelines of the summits, Duterte held separate bilateral meetings with six heads of government: Shinzō Abe of Japan, John Key of New Zealand, Lee Hsien Loong of Singapore, Dmitry Medvedev of Russia, Nguyễn Xuân Phúc of Vietnam, and Thongloun Sisoulith of Laos. Duterte also paid a courtesy call on Laotian president Bounnhang Vorachith at the Presidential Palace in Vientiane.

President Duterte initially planned to meet with United States President Barack Obama during the sidelines of the summit; however, Duterte's remarks at Davao Airport before departing for Laos criticized Obama and the U.S. for planning to discuss the drug war and the human rights situation in the Philippines, prompting the White House to cancel the meeting instead. When asked about the cancellation of the meeting, Obama's deputy national security advisor, Ben Rhodes, said: "Having a meeting where all we were gonna discuss was a series of comments, frankly did not strike us as the most constructive way to approach a bilateral meeting." Duterte and Obama later met informally before attending a gala dinner. On September 7, Duterte skipped the ASEAN–United Nations Summit in order to meet with President Vorachith, and was replaced by Foreign Secretary Perfecto Yasay Jr. to represent the Philippines in the summit. The following day, Duterte also skipped the ASEAN–India and the ASEAN–United States summits, citing a migraine, and was replaced by Yasay again in both meetings. Duterte later admitted to intentionally skipping the said meetings, saying that it was "a matter of principle" for him.

Duterte, however, attended the closing ceremony of the ASEAN Summits to formally accept the Philippines' chairmanship of ASEAN in 2017, the 50th anniversary of the regional bloc. In his acceptance speech, Duterte said:

We [the Philippines] will pursue initiative and enhance cooperation with global partners to ensure that ASEAN citizens live in peace, stability, security and growth, all the while remaining ASEAN's centrality, unity and solidarity. The Philippines is ready and willing to steer and guide the association. But crucial to the realization of our goals is the cooperation and support of all ASEAN member-states and our dialogue partners.

Following his attendance at the ASEAN and East Asia summits in Vientiane, President Duterte travelled to Jakarta, Indonesia for his first state visit as president, arriving on the evening of September 8. He began his trip on September 9 when he met with the Filipino community in Indonesia and addressed them on his campaign against illegal drugs and crime that would assure safety in the Philippines in "maybe two years". Duterte also laid a wreath at the Kalibata Heroes' Cemetery and visited the Tanah Abang market in Central Jakarta with Indonesian president Joko Widodo on a blusukan (impromptu visit), Widodo's preferred method of allowing his visitors to interact with the locals. The two presidents began their formal meeting at the Merdeka Palace later that afternoon, where Duterte was first given arrival honors.

President Duterte and Indonesian president Widodo discussed the threat of the Abu Sayyaf, following the kidnappings of Filipino, Indonesian and Malaysian sailors earlier in the year where ten Indonesians are currently under captive by the militant group; these discussions also included maritime security in the Sulu Sea on the threat of piracy, to which the two presidents signed an agreement allowing Indonesian, Malaysian, and Philippine coast guards to jointly patrol the sea and arrest pirates that would pose threats to their respective territorial waters. With regards to the territorial disputes in the South China Sea to which Indonesia and the Philippines are claimants of, Duterte and Widodo both called for the respect for the rule of law in the disputed territories. The issue of around 700 Indonesian pilgrims travelling to Saudi Arabia for the Hajj using forged Philippine passports was discussed by the two presidents; Widodo thanked the Philippine government for their cooperation in resolving the issue. Duterte and Widodo also vowed for closer economic cooperation and vowed to combat illegal drug trade and terrorism.

Antara and The Jakarta Post initially reported that Duterte informed Widodo that he is allowing for the execution of convicted Filipino drug mule Mary Jane Veloso, who was granted a last-minute temporary reprieve in April 2015; however, presidential spokesman Ernesto Abella and Philippine Foreign Secretary Perfecto Yasay Jr. clarified that Duterte only stated his willingness to respect Indonesian Criminal Procedure and accept any decision made by the Indonesian government regarding her case.

Widodo hosted a state dinner for Duterte at the palace that evening. Duterte later departed Jakarta for his hometown, Davao City, arriving there on the early hours of September 10.

=== Vietnam (September 28–29) ===
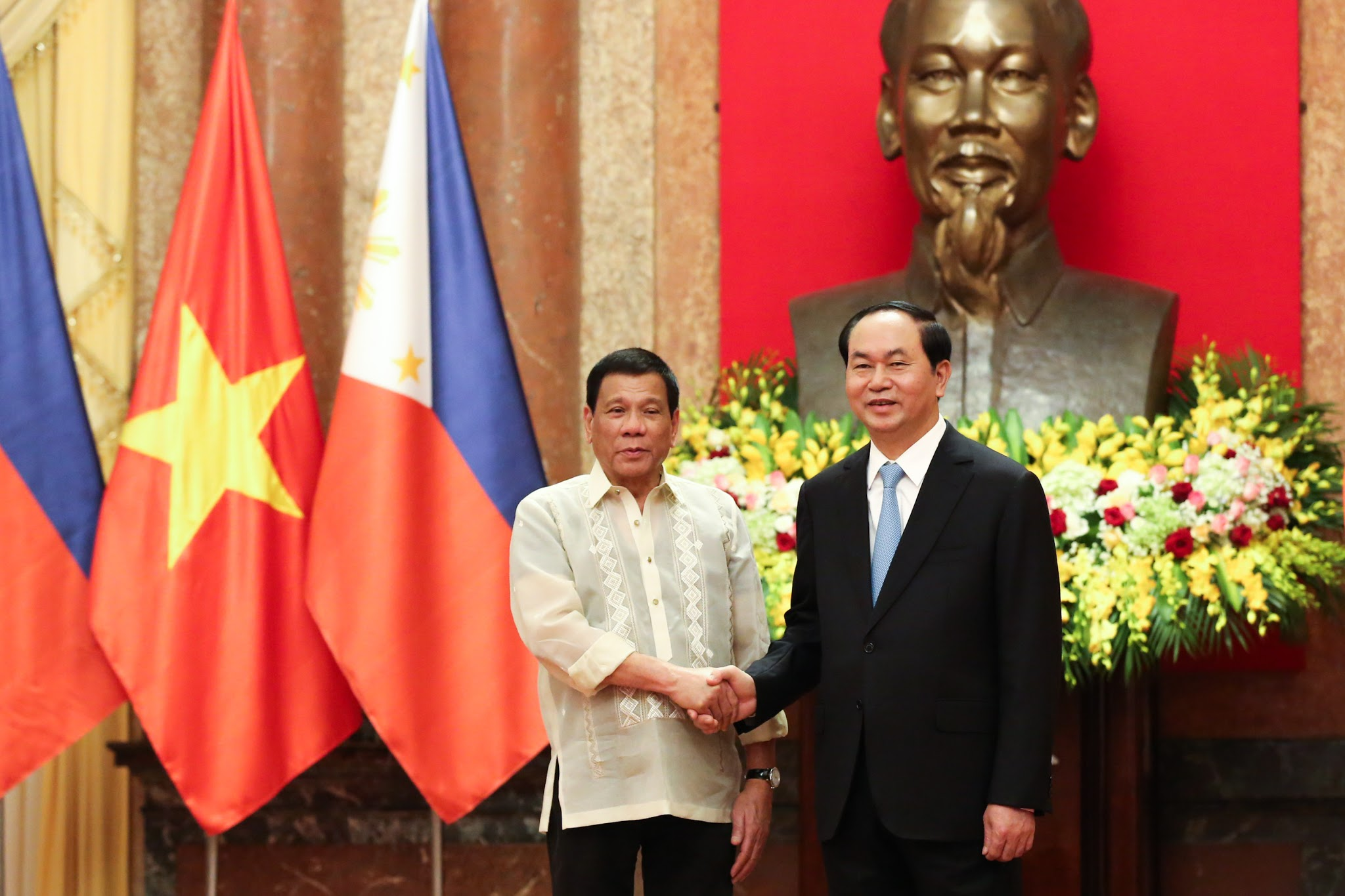
Duterte and Vietnamese president Trần Đại Quang in front of a statue of Ho Chi Minh in Hanoi, September 29, 2016

President Duterte travelled to Hanoi, Vietnam for a two-day official visit that coincides with the commemoration of the 40th anniversary of diplomatic ties between the Philippines and Vietnam. On September 28, he met with the Filipino community in Vietnam, who supported his campaign against illegal drugs, at Intercontinental Hanoi Westlake. On September 29, Duterte laid a wreath at the Vietnam War Memorial and met with Vietnamese president Trần Đại Quang at the Presidential Palace, where he was accorded honors and an official welcome.

Being claimants of disputed territories in the South China Sea, Duterte and Quang reaffirmed their commitment to adhere to the United Nations Convention on the Law of the Sea in maintaining peace and stability and observing freedom of navigation and the rule of law as their countries work towards a peaceful resolution with other claimants. Vietnam supported the Philippines' arbitration case against China at the Permanent Court of Arbitration regarding the territorial disputes, which the Philippines won in July. To improve trade relations between the two countries, Duterte invited Vietnamese businesses to invest in the Philippines and to consider importing more Philippine products into Vietnam. During their meeting, the Philippine and Vietnamese governments agreed to a six-year action plan focused on combating transnational crime and illegal drug trade, in which the two governments are committed to intensifying defense and law enforcement cooperation by sharing expertise, experience, and intelligence information.

Duterte also met with Vietnamese prime minister Nguyễn Xuân Phúc and General Secretary of the Communist Party of Vietnam Nguyễn Phú Trọng. A state dinner was held in honor of Duterte at the Vietnam National Convention Center. Duterte departed Hanoi for Davao City on the evening of September 29.

=== Brunei and China (October 16–21) ===
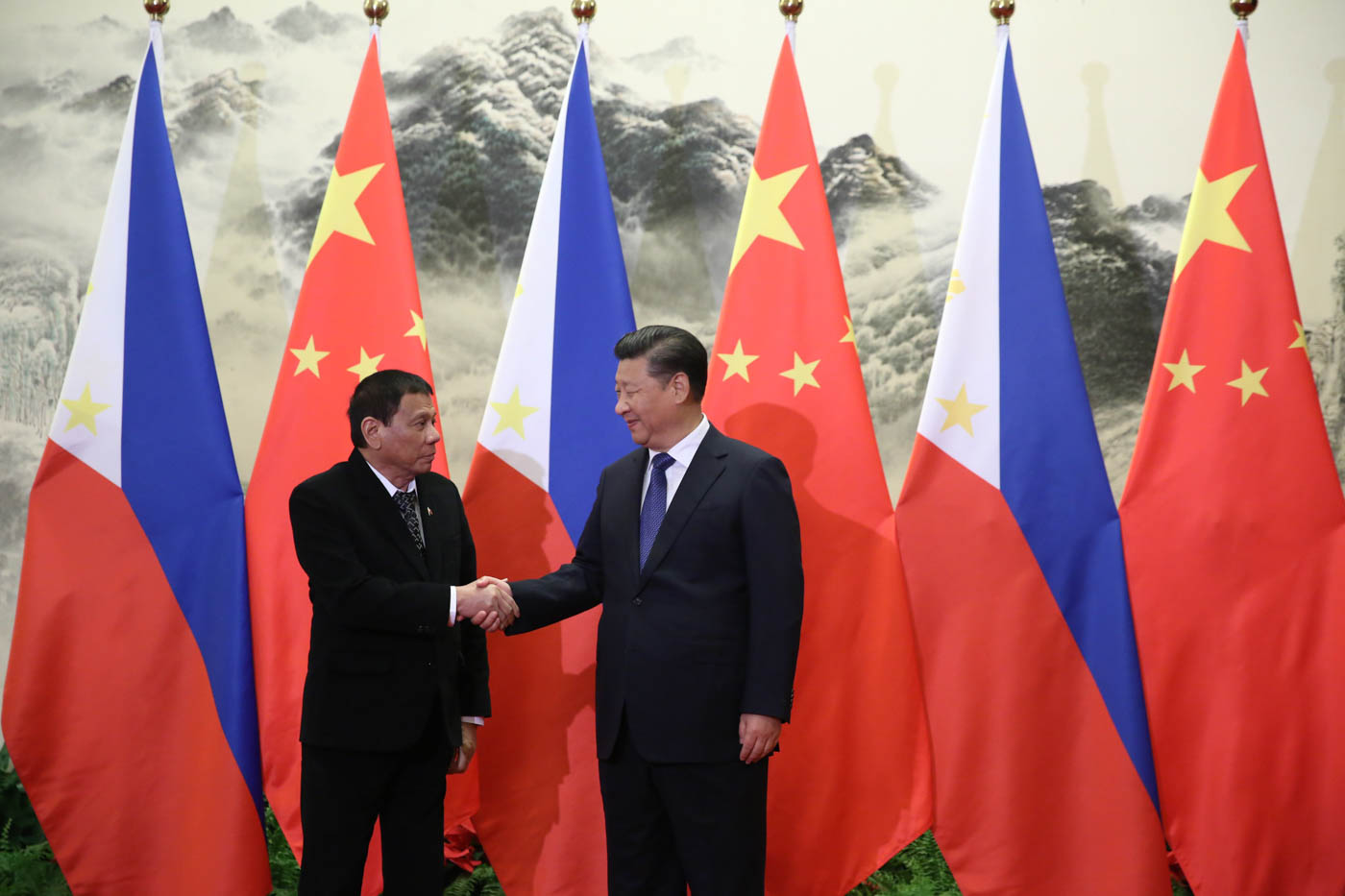
Duterte handshakes with Chinese president Xi Jinping prior to the bilateral meetings at the Great Hall of the People in Beijing on October 20, 2016

President Duterte paid a state visit to Bandar Seri Begawan, Brunei on October 16–18 to meet with Sultan Hassanal Bolkiah and the Overseas Filipinos there. Duterte initially planned to visit Brunei in September as his first international trip as president, but was prompted to postpone it due to the Davao City bombing. The Sultan welcomed Duterte at the Nurul Iman Palace, where they discussed the strengthening of Brunei–Philippines relations and BIMP-EAGA through trade and investment. The two leaders also discussed Brunei's cooperation and support for the Bangsamoro peace process, as well as the strengthening of Halal product certification in the Philippines to improve the country's agribusiness and tourism.

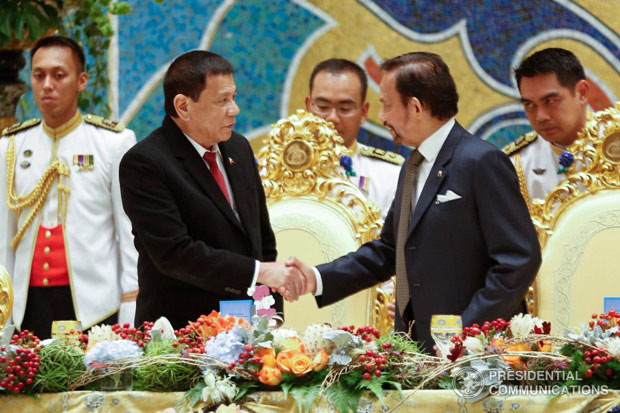
President Rodrigo Duterte and Brunei Darussalam Sultan Haji Hassanal Bolkiah Mu’zzaddin Waddaulah shake hands

On October 18–21, President Duterte travelled to Beijing, China on a state visit to meet with Chinese president Xi Jinping and Chinese premier Li Keqiang to discuss ways on improving ties and cooperation amid regional issues, specifically the territorial disputes in the South China Sea. The two governments reiterated their agreement to properly resolve the disputes through bilateral discussion. Around 400 Filipino business executives joined Duterte in his delegation to discuss deals with Chinese business executives and government officials in the sectors of agribusiness, construction, energy, manufacturing, rail transport, and tourism. Duterte spoke at the Philippines–China Trade and Investment Forum, where he announced a "separation" from the United States in front of the Filipino and Chinese businessmen as well Chinese officials which he cited that the U.S. had lost "militarily, socially, and economically" and emphasizes a realignment of the Philippines to move closer to China. The Filipino press reported Duterte saying, "I have separated from them so I will be dependent on you for a long time but don't worry we will also help." The U.S. Department of State reacted to Duterte's rhetoric citing that it is causing confusion and consternation but reiterated the strong Philippines–United States relations. Duterte later departed Beijing for Davao City on the evening of October 22 with investments and loans worth of $24 billion.

=== Japan (October 25–27) ===
On the evening of October 25, 2016, President Duterte arrived at Haneda Airport for a three-day official visit to Tokyo to discuss "economic and defense concerns" with the Japanese government and business executives. Duterte's trip to Japan follows his trip to Beijing, where he announced a military and economic "separation" from the United States, which caused confusion within U.S., Filipino, and Japanese officials. During a speech addressing Filipino and Japanese businessmen at the Palace Hotel, Tokyo, Duterte assured them that his visit to Beijing focused on economic relations and had no intentions of forging a military alliance with China. He also expressed confidence that more Japanese businesses will continue to invest in the Philippines as the Philippine government continues to implement policies to ensure macroeconomic stability and improve the country's "ease of doing business", emphasizing the importance of their economic relations as a priority for the Philippines.

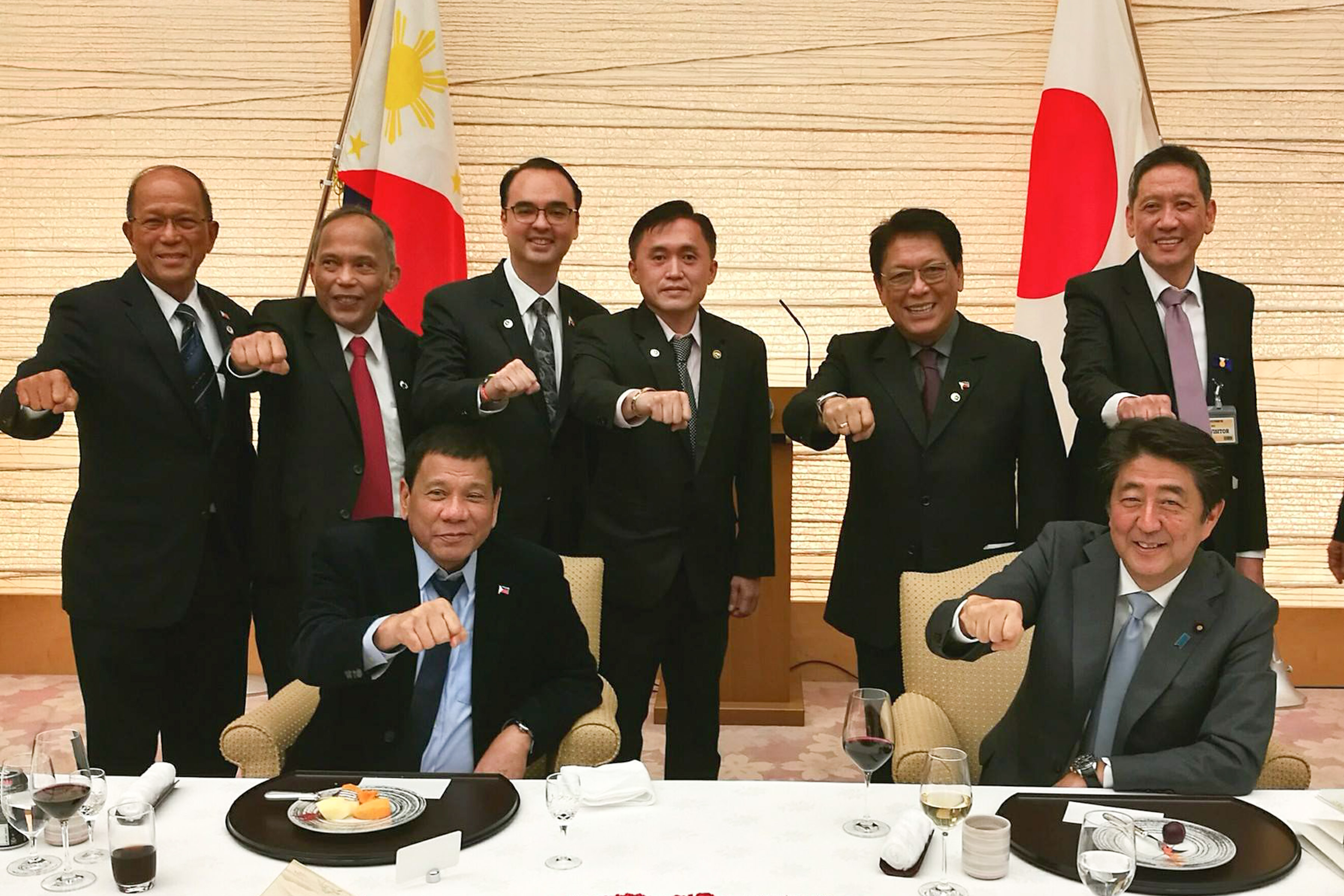
Duterte with Japanese prime minister Shinzō Abe and members of the Philippine delegation during the latter's visit at the Prime Minister's Official Residence in Tokyo, October 2016

On October 26, President Duterte met with Japanese prime minister Shinzō Abe at the Prime Minister's Official Residence, where the two leaders issued a joint statement; in it, they reaffirmed their commitment to promote and enhance the strategic partnership between Japan and the Philippines under common values of "freedom, democracy, the rule of law, respect for basic human rights, and a free and open economy" in strengthening bilateral cooperation to maintain regional peace, stability, and prosperity. Duterte expressed his appreciation for Japan's cooperation with the Philippines through training and development, capacity building, and Japan's provision of equipment for the Armed Forces of the Philippines, which included ten patrol boats, five Beechcraft TC-90 trainer aircraft from the Japan Maritime Self-Defense Force, and high-speed crafts to enhance the country's maritime security and counter-terrorism capabilities. Being claimants of disputed territories in the South China and East China seas respectively, Duterte and Abe stressed the importance of observing freedom of navigation and overflight and adhering to the rule of law when resolving the disputes with other claimants, in accordance with the United Nations Convention on the Law of the Sea.

On October 27, President Duterte visited the headquarters of the Japan Coast Guard in Yokohama, where he viewed the coast guard's demonstration activities; there, he also expressed a possibility for joint military exercises with Japan instead of the U.S., to whom he reiterated his "separation" with and said that their joint Balikatan military exercises this year would be "their last" in pursuit of his administration's "independent foreign policy". Duterte initially planned to conclude his trip with a courtesy call on Emperor Akihito and Empress Michiko at the Tokyo Imperial Palace but had to cancel it following the announcement of the death of Takahito, Prince Mikasa. Duterte departed Tokyo later that day with investment offers and loans totalling $19 billion for infrastructure, agricultural development, defense, and employment.

=== Thailand and Malaysia (November 9–10) ===
On November 9, President Duterte travelled to Bangkok, Thailand to pay his respects to the late King Bhumibol Adulyadej at the Grand Palace. He later travelled to Kuala Lumpur, Malaysia for a two-day official visit to meet with Malaysian prime minister Najib Razak to discuss piracy in the Strait of Malacca, and possible joint military and police operations with Malaysia to quell piracy in the Sulu Sea and Abu Sayyaf militant kidnappings activities. During his visit there, Duterte agreed to set aside the Sabah dispute to focus on the social welfare of Filipino migrants and expatriates in the state with the signing of various agreements with his Malaysian counterpart such as the establishment of Filipino school, hospital and a consulate in Sabah, while those problematic Filipino illegal immigrants and refugees will be return to the Philippines. In addition, the Philippine government allow Malaysia to chase Abu Sayyaf kidnappers and Moro pirates into the Philippines waters and economic agreements on the halal sector as well palm oil and rubber investment in Mindanao and Palawan and a joint-venture in the construction of a rail line in Manila were materialized. Duterte also met with the Filipino community in Malaysia, where he reiterated his pledge to fight corruption, criminality, and illegal drugs.

=== Peru (November 18–20) ===
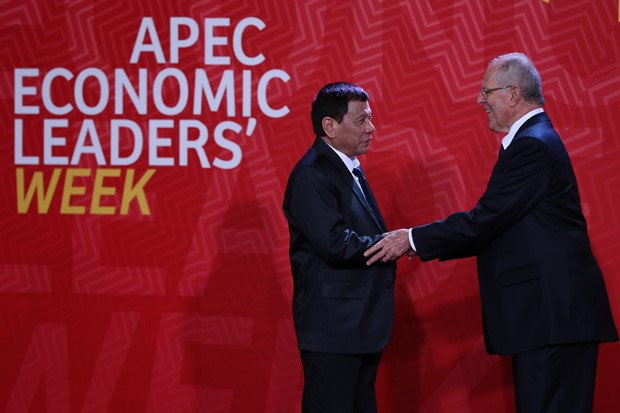
President Rodrigo Duterte is welcomed by Peruvian president Pedro Pablo Kuczynski upon his arrival at the Asia-Pacific Economic Cooperation (APEC) Leaders’ Summit in Lima, Peru on November 19, 2016

President Duterte attended the APEC Economic Leaders' Meeting in Lima on November 19–20, which was hosted by President Pedro Pablo Kuczynski. En route to and from Lima, his aircraft made technical stopovers in Auckland, New Zealand.

On the sidelines of the meeting, President Duterte held bilateral meetings with Chinese president Xi Jinping and Russian president Vladimir Putin. Duterte met with Xi to discuss the alignment of the former's foreign policy towards Asian economic development, to follow up on the memorandum of understandings signed during the former's state visit to Beijing in October, and to discuss the permission of Filipino fisherman to enter the disputed Scarborough Shoal. Duterte met with Putin to discuss the development of Philippines–Russia relations. Duterte also praised Putin's leadership skills, calling him his "idol", and the latter invited the former to visit Russia.

Duterte skipped the APEC gala dinner and the shoot of the APEC leaders’ family photo to avoid interacting with U.S. president Barack Obama. Former Philippine president Fidel Ramos criticized Duterte's actions, saying that while Duterte and his Cabinet may have thought that the two events are negligible, it could have disappointed the host country. "Peru President Pedro Pablo Kuczynski must be very disappointed," Ramos said. He said the gala night could have been an opportunity for Duterte to exchange ideas with world leaders and sickness is an unacceptable alibi to skip such an important gathering.

=== Cambodia and Singapore (December 13–16) ===
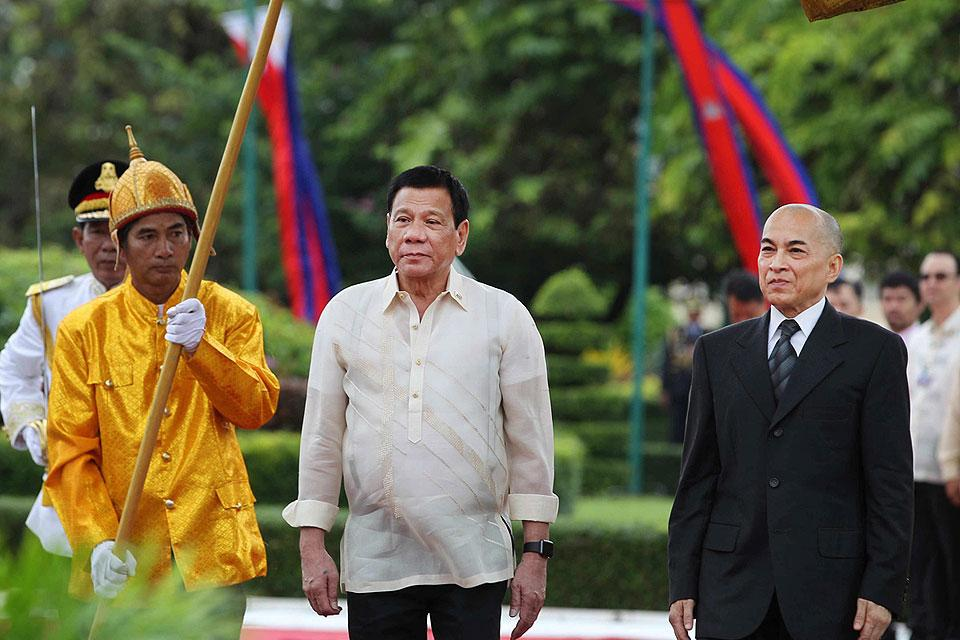
Duterte and Cambodian King Norodom Sihamoni on a welcome ceremony at the Royal Palace, Phnom Penh, December 14, 2016

President Duterte travelled to Phnom Penh, Cambodia on December 13–14 for a two-day state visit to meet with Cambodian prime minister Hun Sen and King Norodom Sihamoni. His trip to Cambodia was initially planned to be a working visit upon the request of the Philippine government, but was later upgraded to a state visit by the Cambodian government. Duterte was accorded arrival honors at the Royal Palace, where he was received by King Sihamoni for a bilateral meeting. Duterte then met with Prime Minister Hun Sen at the Peace Palace, where they witnessed the signing of deals on cooperation in trade, sports, tourism, and combating transnational crime. Duterte also visited the Independence Monument and paid his respects to the late King Norodom Sihanouk by laying a wreath at his memorial. Before departing Cambodia, King Sihamoni hosted a state dinner for Duterte at the Royal Palace.

Duterte then travelled to Singapore on the evening of December 14 for a three-day state visit. On December 15, he met with Singaporean president Tony Tan and Prime Minister Lee Hsien Loong at the Istana, where he was accorded arrival honors by the Singapore Armed Forces. Duterte held separate meetings with Tan and Lee at the palace to discuss areas of bilateral cooperation to pursue, primarily with regards to counter-terrorism and combating illegal drug trade and transnational crime. They vowed to push for a safer ASEAN community. The meetings were followed by a state dinner hosted by President Tan.

On December 16, Lee treated Duterte to a nasi lemak lunch at Ann Siang Hill. Duterte also visited the Singapore Botanic Gardens, where a dendrobium orchid was named after him. Before departing Singapore, Duterte addressed the Filipino community in Singapore at the Singapore Expo, where he thanked them for contributing to the Philippine economy and told them to be "assertive of their rights."

== 2017 ==
=== Myanmar and Thailand (March 19–22) ===
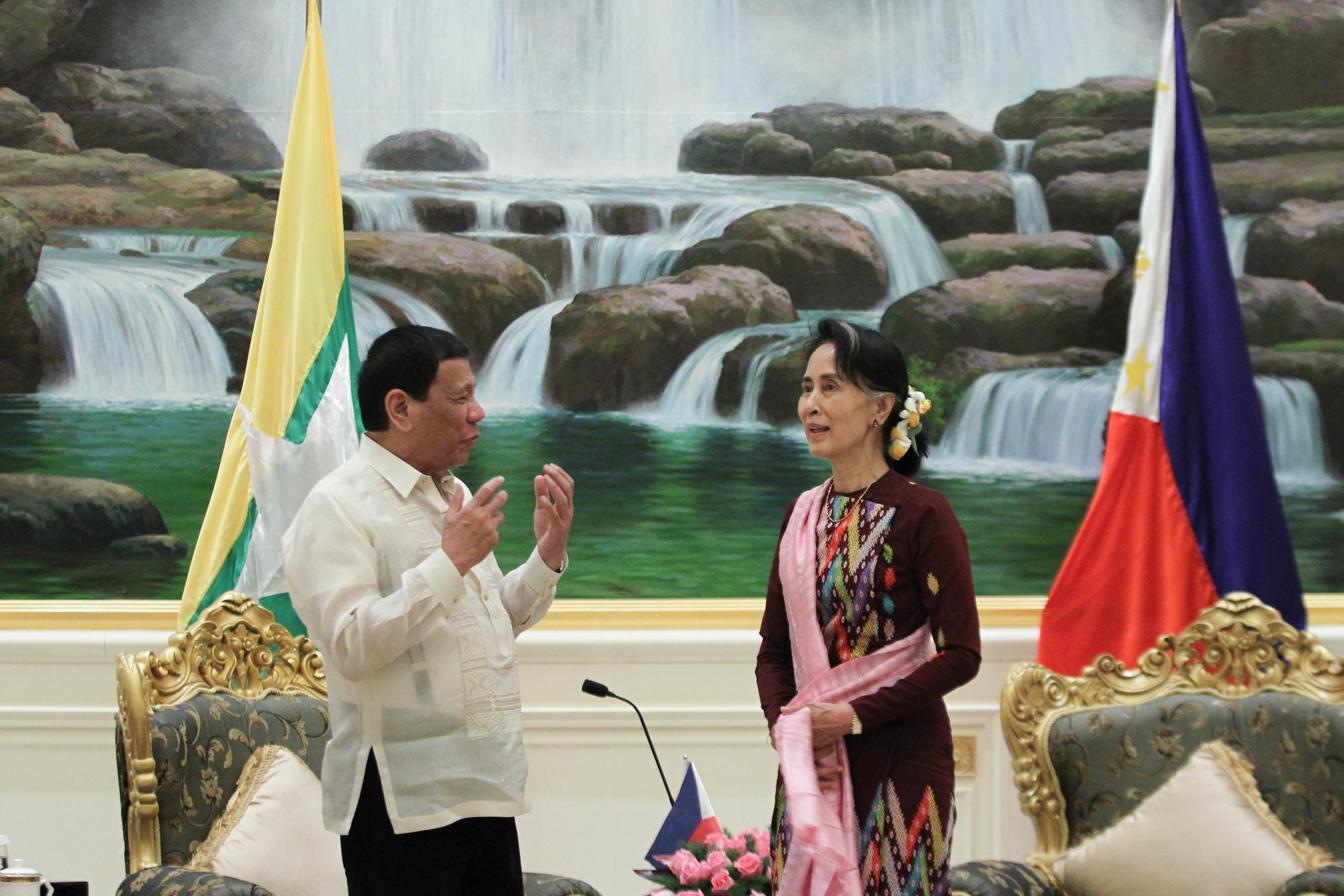
Duterte talks with Burmese State Counsellor Aung San Suu Kyi during the former's state visit in Naypyidaw on March 20, 2017

President Duterte travelled to Naypyidaw, Myanmar to embark on an official visit to the country. After his arrival at the Naypyidaw Airport, he headed straight to the Horizon Lake View Hotel to address the Filipino community. In his speech, he criticized the critics of his drug war. He also urged the Filipino community to return to the Philippines to experience that the country is much safer under his administration. During the second day of his visit to Myanmar, he met the president of Myanmar Htin Kyaw. He was accorded arrival honors upon his arrival at the Presidential Palace. In their meeting, both presidents vowed to strengthen bilateral relations between the Philippines and Myanmar. Duterte also expressed his support for Myanmar's effort to seek regional peace. After the meeting, Duterte witnessed the signing of a memorandum of understanding on food security and agricultural cooperation. He also met the State Counsellor of Myanmar Aung San Suu Kyi. In their meeting, Duterte discussed agricultural education and technology with her. After the meeting, Duterte handed over to her a pledge worth of US$300,000 to Suu Kyi for the Philippines' humanitarian assistance to Myanmar's Rakhine State, the biggest donation made so far by an ASEAN member this year. He also met the commander-in-chief of the Tatmadaw Min Aung Hlaing.

After his visit to Myanmar, he headed to Bangkok, Thailand to embark on an official visit to the country. In the afternoon of March 21, he was welcomed by Thai prime minister Prayut Chan-o-cha and was accorded arrival honors at the Government House. In their meeting, the two discussed issues of mutual concerns in politics, economy, agriculture, energy, education, and defense cooperation. After their meeting, the Philippines and Thailand signed agreements on cooperation in agriculture, tourism, and science and technology. In their press statement, both Duterte and Prayut affirmed the defense and economic cooperation between the two countries. At the last day of his visit, he addressed the Filipino Community. In his speech, Duterte said that Thai PM Prayut who was celebrating his birthday last March 21 gave him an early surprise birthday cake during the official dinner in honor of him.

Alam mo kagabi, kabait ng Prime Minister ninyo. Alam mo, birthday niya kagabi, pero alam niya birthday ko rin, malapit na. Alam mo, kaya pala tumindig, 'Sandali lang ah.' Nagpagawa ng cake para sa akin: 'happy birthday,'" recalled Duterte. (You know, last night, your Prime Minister was so nice. You know, it was his birthday but he also knew my birthday is coming soon. You know, that's why he said, "Just a moment." He had a cake baked for me: "happy birthday.")

His visit to Thailand marks the end of Duterte's introductory visits to all ASEAN member states.

=== Saudi Arabia, Bahrain and Qatar (April 10–16) ===
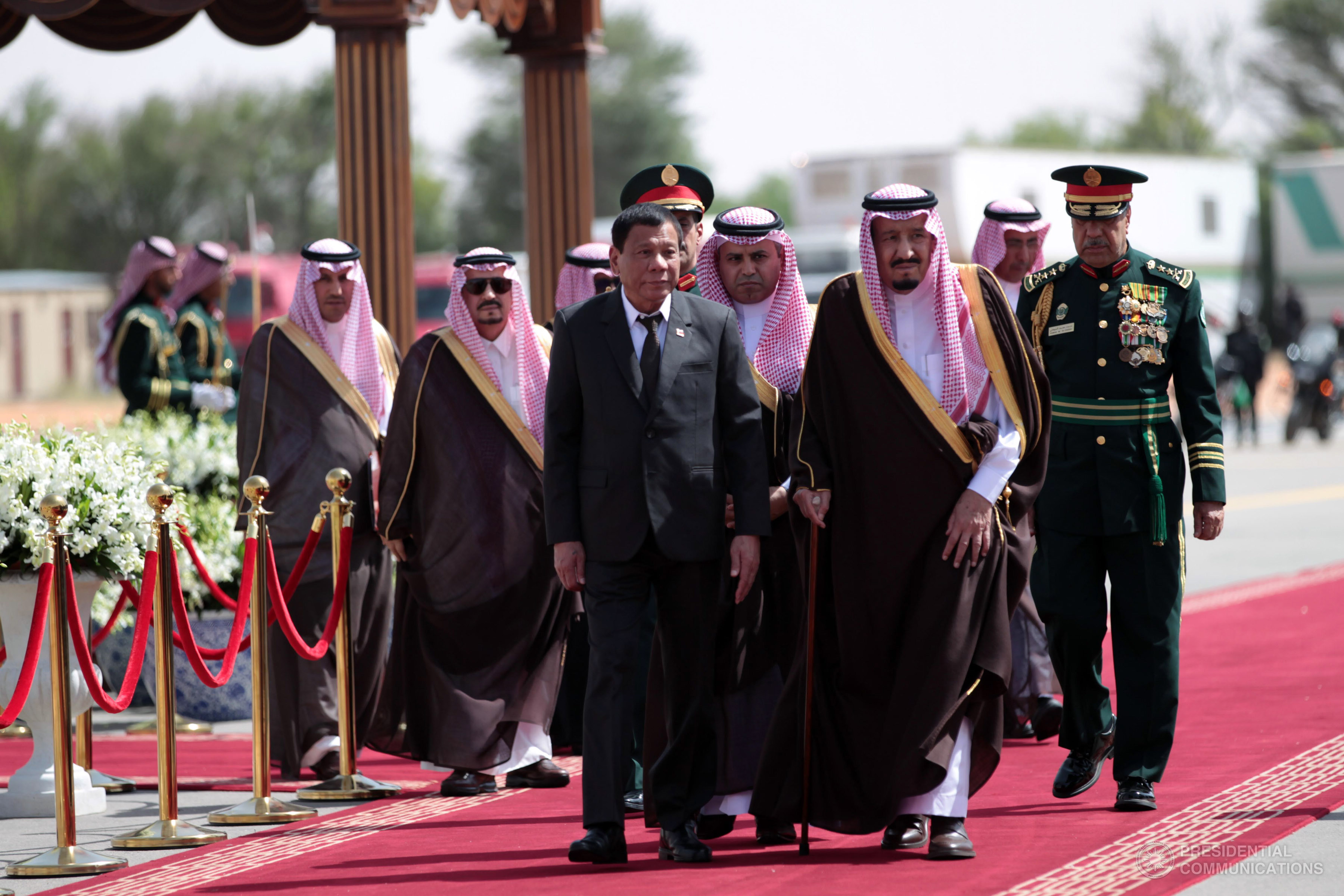
Duterte with King Salman of Saudi Arabia during the welcoming ceremony in Riyadh, April 11, 2017

President Duterte travelled to Riyadh, Saudi Arabia for a state visit. His trip to Saudi Arabia is the first stop of his Gulf tour. Upon his arrival at King Khalid International Airport, he was welcomed by Riyadh Governor Prince Faisal bin Bandar bin Abdulaziz Al Saud. In the afternoon of April 11 he met King Salman at his private residence. In their meeting, Duterte and King Salman discussed areas of cooperation on the economic, trade and security. Duterte and King Salman also discussed terrorism and the campaign against illegal drugs. Duterte and King Salman have agreed to boost their cooperation on trade and security. The two also vowed to support each other's campaign against terrorism and violent extremism. After their meeting, Duterte and King Salman witnessed the signing of three agreements on political consultations, diplomatic academies and labor. On the sidelines of the meeting, PCOO Secretary Martin Andanar met Saudi Minister of Information and Culture Adel Al Toraifi to discuss the Philippine government's plan to launch a state-run Muslim channel named Salaam TV in June 2017. Andanar said that Adel Al Toraifi was willing to assist the PCOO in setting up the Muslim channel. Energy Secretary Alfonso Cusi also submitted a draft memorandum of understanding to his Saudi Arabian counterpart Saudi Energy Minister Khalid A. Al-Falih for a possible energy cooperation between the Philippines and Saudi Arabia. At the last day of his visit to Saudi Arabia, Duterte addressed some Saudi businessmen in which Duterte invited them to invest in the Philippines. He headed to the Riyadh Marriott Hotel to address the Filipino community in which Duterte vowed better working conditions for Filipinos in Saudi Arabia.

After his trip to Saudi Arabia, President Duterte travelled to Manama, Bahrain for a state visit to the country. Bahrain is Duterte's 2nd stop in his Gulf tour. He was welcomed by Bahrain Deputy Prime Minister Sheikh Ali bin Khalifa al Khalifa upon his arrival at the Bahrain International Airport. He started his official visit by having a private lunch with the Deputy PM of Bahrain Sheikh Ali bin Khalifa al Khalifa. At the evening, Duterte met the King of Bahrain Hamad bin Isa al Khalifa at the Sakhir Palace. In their meeting they discussed regional and international developments, and matters of mutual interest. After the meeting, Philippine and Bahraini officials signed four agreements that include: A Memorandum of Understanding on the establishment of a Joint High Commission on Bilateral Cooperation between the Kingdom of Bahrain and the Republic of the Philippines; A Memorandum of Understanding on cooperation between the Diplomatic Institute of the Ministry of Foreign Affairs of the Kingdom of Bahrain and the Foreign Service Institute of the Philippine Department of Foreign Affairs; A protocol on amending articles of the agreement between Bahrain and the Philippines on the Avoidance of Double Taxation; A draft protocol on the agreement on regulating air transport services between Bahrain and the Philippines. A business agreement was also signed in the presence of the two leaders – the expansion of agricultural operations between AMA Group Holdings Corporation and Nader & Ebrahim Sons of Hassan Company WLL (NEH). In his last day in Bahrain, he met Prince Salman Bin Hamad Bin Isa Al Khalifa, Deputy King and Crown Prince of Bahrain at the Bahrain International Circuit. He also met some Bahraini businessmen in which he told to them that the Philippines is ready to send troops in any event of attack. Duterte told them that he made this commitment to King Hamad bin Isa Al Khalifa when they had a meeting at Sakhir Palace on the occasion of his state visit. He also addressed the Filipino community at the Khalifa Sports Community Complex.

After his visit to Bahrain, the president headed to Doha, Qatar for a state visit to the country. His visit to Qatar is the last leg of his Gulf tour. He arrived at Hamad International Airport in the evening. He was welcomed by Qatar Energy Minister Mohammed Bin Saleh Al Sada upon his arrival at the airport. Duterte on April 15, addressed some businessmen in Qatar and he assured to them that investing in the Philippines, particularly in Mindanao, would be lucrative. Duterte also addressed the Filipino community at the Lusail Sports Arena. At the last day of his visit, he met the Emir of Qatar Tamim bin Hamad Al Thani at the Amiri Diwan. In their meeting, both leaders reviewed means to enhance their bilateral relations in all fields, especially in infrastructure, agriculture, health and education investments and labor. They also discussed "increasing cooperation in the fields of experience exchange and expatriate labor" and "a number of regional and international issues of common interest. After the meeting, Philippine and Qatari officials signed agreements on culture, investment, technical education cooperation, and health. After his visit to the Amiri Diwan, he invited the Emir to visit the Philippines. Duterte's visit to Middle East yielded an amount of investments worth $925 million.

=== Cambodia and China (May 10–16) ===
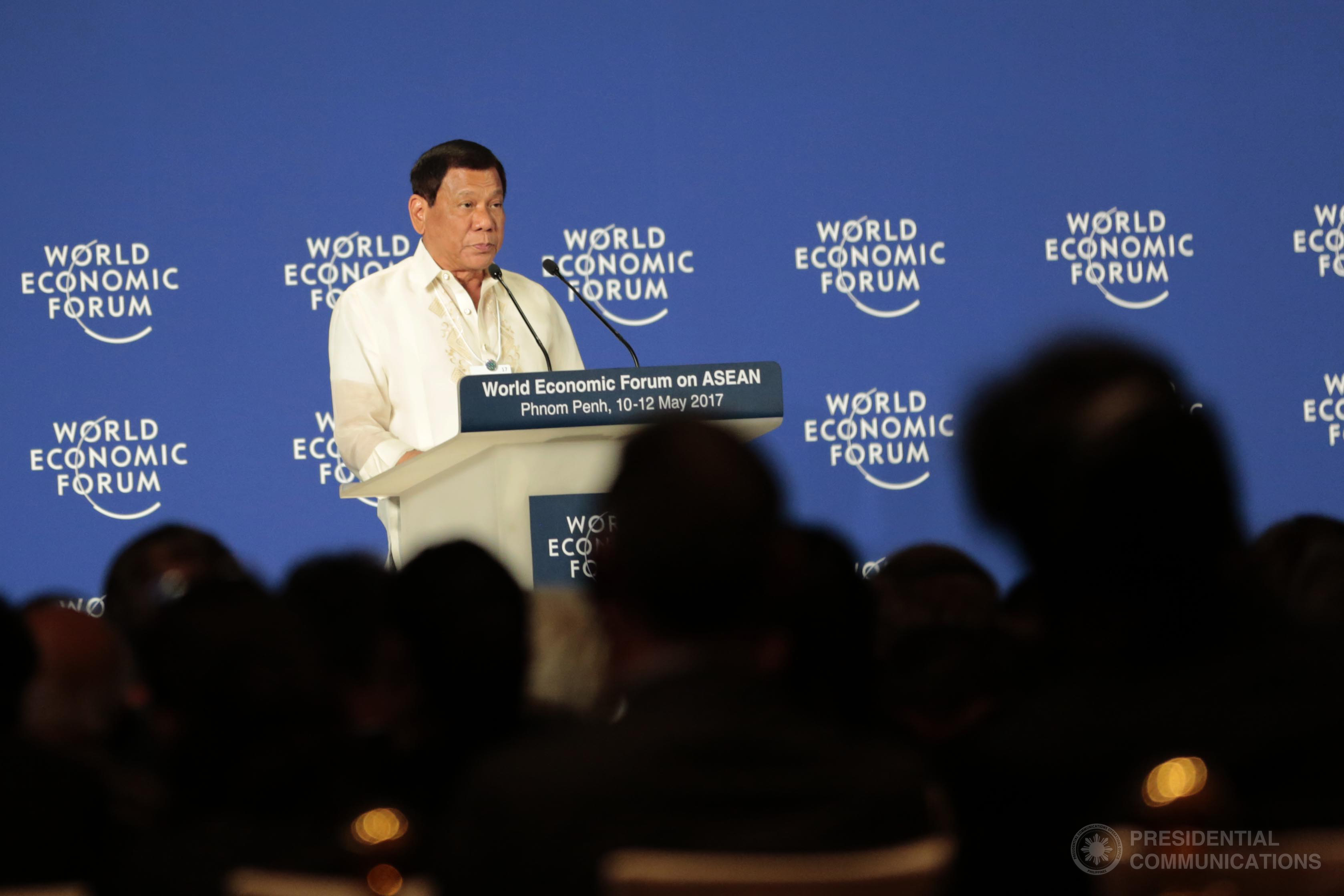
Duterte speaking at the World Economic Forum in Phnom Penh, May 11, 2017

President Duterte travelled to Phnom Penh, Cambodia for the second time, this time to attend the World Economic Forum as the chairman of the Association of Southeast Asian Nations. In his trip, Duterte was accompanied by his partner Honeylet Avanceña and daughter Veronica for the first time. Duterte was scheduled to present his economic plan named "Dutertenomics" during the forum, but he was instead represented by Transportation Secretary Arthur Tugade, Public Works and Highways Secretary Mark Villar, and Bases Conversion and Development Authority President and CEO Vince Dizon. Duterte along with Laotian prime minister Thongloun Sisoulith, Cambodian prime minister Hun Sen, and Vietnamese prime minister Nguyen Xuan Phuc attended the ASEAN: 50 Years Young plenary. In his speech, Duterte highlighted the need to dismantle the illegal drug trade apparatus.

“But we cannot turn a blind eye on the scourge of illegal drugs that threatens our youth and the future of our societies. We need to take a committed stand to dismantle and destroy the illegal drugs trade apparatus. We must reaffirm our commitment to realize a drug-free Asean community,”

Duterte also said that investing in human capital is a priority. Duterte also highlighted how Southeast Asian countries can sustain its economic integration through the “Asean Way.” Duterte also urged the Asean member states to work together as partners “in an enduring engagement to bring positive change for our region and our world.”

“Asean is now closer to achieving ‘One Vision, One Identity, One Community.’ But the Asean story does not end here. This is a continuing tale that we must shape and build for the interests of our peoples. The Philippines will do its part. Asean Member States will do their part as well,”

After his trip to Cambodia, President Duterte flew to Hong Kong to embark on a working visit to the special administrative region. During his first day in Hong Kong, Duterte spent a private time with his family with the 3 of them visiting a hospital according to Presidential Spokesperson Ernesto Abella. At his last day in Hong Kong, Duterte addressed the Filipino community at the Regal Airport Hotel.

After his trip to Hong Kong, President Duterte flew to Beijing, China to attend the One Belt One Road forum of Chinese president Xi Jinping. During the sidelines of the forum, Duterte had a bilateral meeting with Mongolian prime minister Jargaltulgyn Erdenebat. In a press statement, the Malacañang said, “The two leaders exchanged views on expanding interaction in many areas, including in agriculture, trade and investment, finance, and tourism, among others.” Both leaders expressed their desire to visit each other's countries in a convenient date. Duterte also met Turkish president Recep Tayyip Erdoğan informally. Both Mongolia and Turkey expressed their interest to join the ASEAN according to Duterte. At the first day of the forum, Duterte didn't attend the opening ceremony of the Belt and Road Forum. According to the Department of Foreign Affairs, Duterte was working on preparations for his meetings on May 15. Duterte later attended the BRF welcome dinner hosted by President Xi Jinping at the Great Hall of the People. At the second and last day of the forum, Duterte attended the Leaders Roundtable Session I and II at the Yanqi Lake International Convention Center. According to the Department of Foreign Affairs, the topics that were discussed include infrastructure connectivity; economic and trade cooperation; industrial investment; energy and resources; financial support; people-to-people exchanges; ecological and environmental protection; and marine cooperation. After his attendance to the Belt and Road Forum, he had a bilateral meeting with Chinese premier Li Keqiang. Later, he also had a bilateral meeting with President Xi. Four agreements on economic and technical cooperation, cooperation in human resource development, energy cooperation, and news and publishing were signed. Duterte later departed Beijing at the evening.

=== Russia (May 22–24) ===
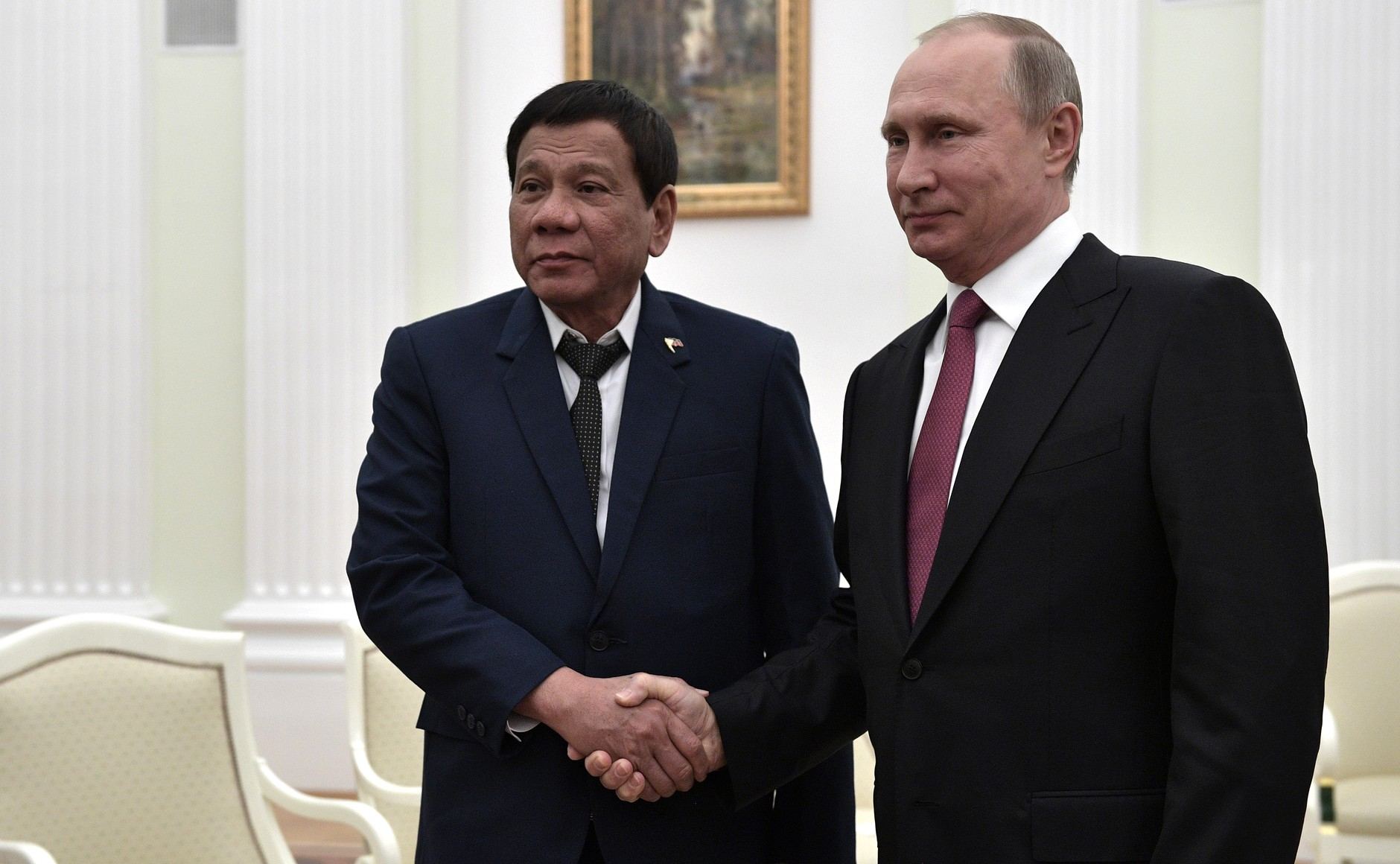
Duterte and Russian president Vladimir Putin meeting in Moscow, May 23, 2017

President Duterte's official visit to Russia, which was initially set for May 22–26, was shortened due to the clashes between government forces and the Maute group in Marawi. Duterte declared martial law in Mindanao. On the evening of May 22, Duterte arrived at the Vnukovo-2 Airport at 22:30 (MSK), where he was given a welcoming ceremony by Russian officials. The following day, presidential spokesman Ernesto Abella announced that Duterte would depart Moscow for Manila that night in order to properly deal with the situation following the declaration of martial law, cutting short the trip. Upon the announcement, a last-minute meeting between Duterte and Russian president Vladimir Putin was scheduled for that evening at the Moscow Kremlin. Putin quickly returned to Moscow from a trip to Krasnodar to participate in the meeting. During the meeting, which was initially scheduled for May 26, Duterte asked Putin for a soft loan that would be used to purchase firearms from Russia due to the cancellation of an arms deal with the United States. He informed Putin of the shortening of his Russian trip due to the clashes, to which Putin offered his condolences. Duterte then extended his invitation to the Russian leader to visit the Philippines according to Foreign Affairs Secretary Alan Peter Cayetano. Duterte departed Moscow's Vnukovo-2 Airport at around midnight, May 24 (MSK). Some of Duterte's delegation were left in Moscow to continue Duterte's shortened visit to Russia and also to sign agreements with their counterparts. Foreign Affairs Secretary Alan Peter Cayetano and Russian Foreign Minister Sergey Lavrov led the signing of agreements on defense cooperation, intelligence sharing, agriculture, trade, tourism, culture, foreign affairs, transportation and the peaceful use of nuclear energy.

=== Brunei (October 5–6) ===
President Duterte attended the celebration of Sultan Hassanal Bolkiah's golden jubilee in Bandar Seri Begawan.

=== Japan (October 29–31) ===
President Duterte, accompanied by his partner Honeylet Avanceña and daughter Veronica, travelled to Japan on an official visit to meet with Prime Minister Shinzō Abe at his official residence in Tokyo. There, he was given arrival honors, followed by a summit meeting, a tête-à-tête with Prime Minister Abe, and a joint statement. Duterte is the first head of state to visit Abe following his party's victory in the Japanese snap election, a week prior. In their joint statement, President Duterte said that Japan and the Philippines have embarked on a "golden age of strategic partnership" as the two countries continue to strengthen their economic and security cooperation. Prime Minister Abe announced that the Japanese government had pledged US$9 billion worth of assistance for the rehabilitation of Marawi following the city's five-month-long siege.

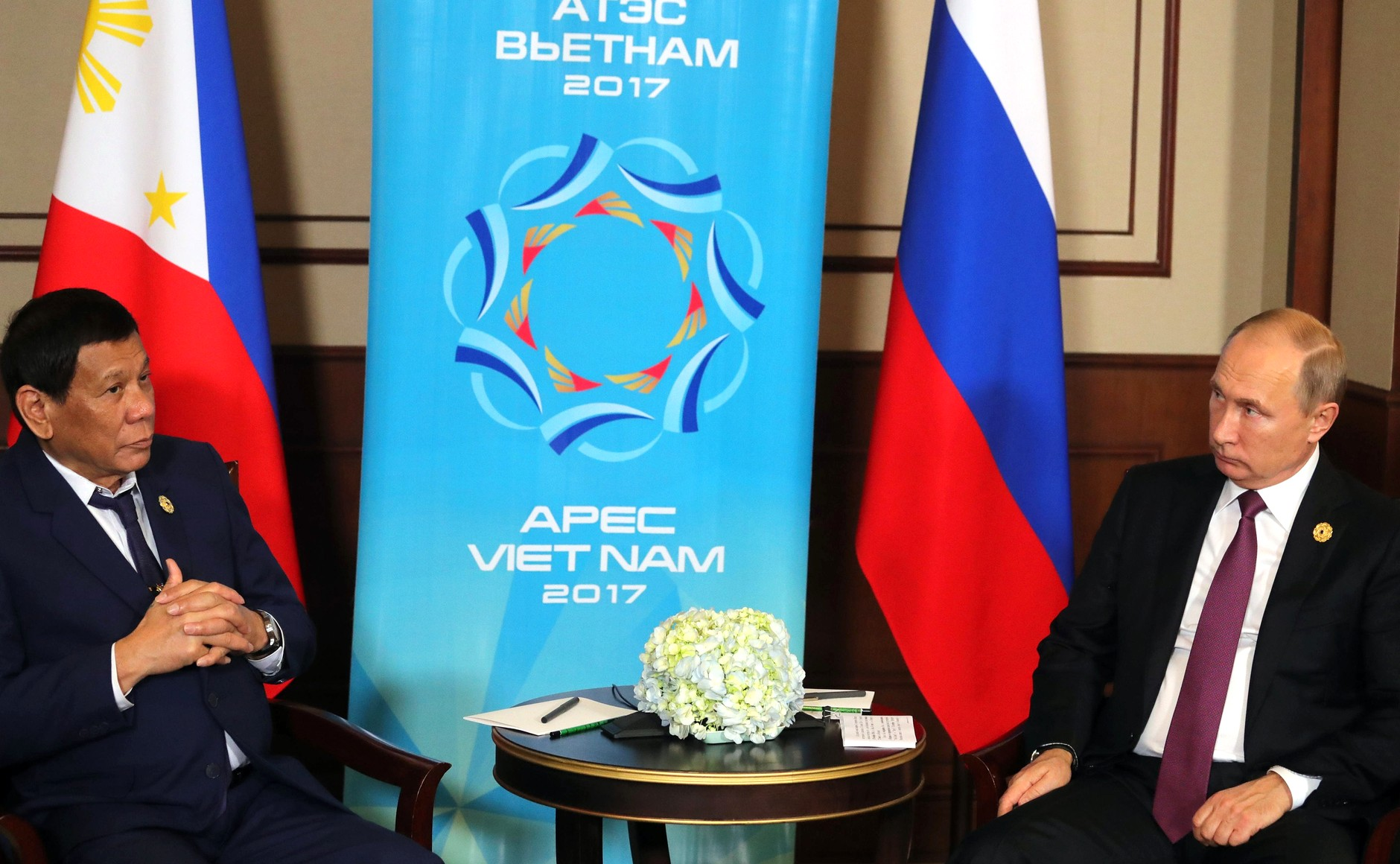
Vladimir Putin & Rodrigo Duterte at APEC Summit in Da Nang, Vietnam, November 10, 2017

On October 31, President Duterte and Avanceña had an audience with Emperor Akihito and Empress Michiko at the Imperial Palace. The president had initially scheduled a meeting with the imperial couple during his first trip to Japan in October 2016, but was forced to cancel the meeting following the death of Takahito, Prince Mikasa.

=== Vietnam (November 8–11) ===
President Duterte attended the APEC Economic Leaders' Meeting in Da Nang. During the sidelines, he met with Russian president Vladimir V. Putin and Chinese president Xi Jinping.

== 2018 ==
=== India (January 24–26) ===
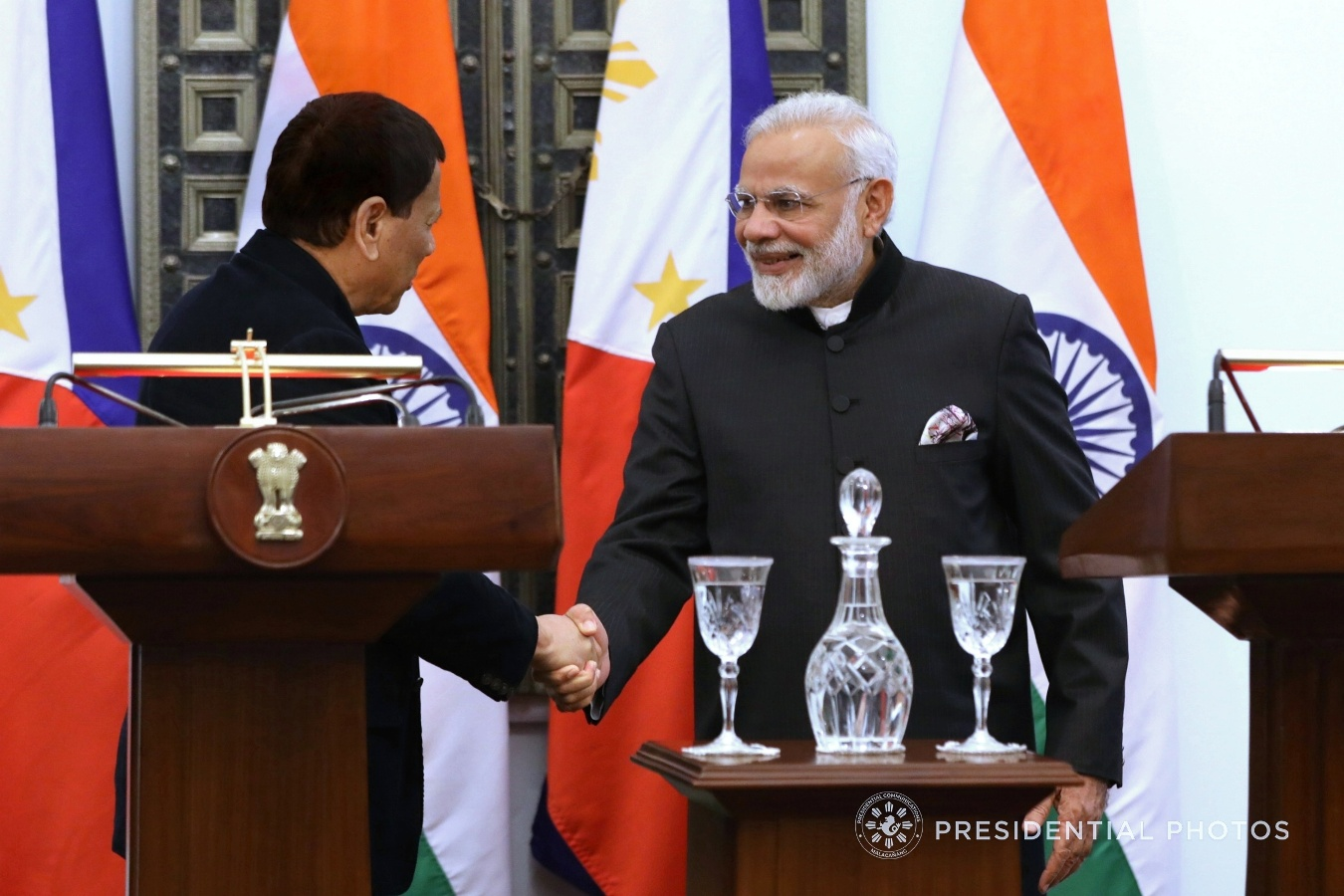
Duterte and Indian prime minister Narendra Modi in January 2018

Duterte visited New Delhi, India for the 25th ASEAN-India Commemorative Summit and also to attend the 2018 Republic Day celebrations as one of the Chief Guests of the parade along with his fellow ASEAN leaders.

=== China (April 9–12) ===
Duterte was accompanied by his daughter, Davao City Mayor Sara Duterte, and grandson, Stingray. He attended the Boao Forum for Asia. And with a goal to advance the Philippine economy, President Rodrigo Duterte on Tuesday, April 10, encouraged partnerships between "home-grown and foreign-based" companies that would create more opportunities for the Filipino people. In a speech delivered at the Boao Forum for Asia in China, the Philippine president looked forward to securing a deal with such "responsible" firms to enable him to fulfill his desire to improve the lives of his fellow countrymen. Duterte met with his Chinese Counterpart, Xi Jinping and witnessed the signing of 6 agreements. Later on, President Xi Jinping and Madame Peng Liyuan hosted a dinner for Duterte and the Cabinet. Duterte flew to China's SAR, Hong Kong and expected to meet the Filipino people there.

=== Singapore (April 27–28) ===
President Rodrigo Duterte attends the 32nd Association of Southeast Asian Nations (ASEAN) Summit.

=== South Korea (June 3–5) ===
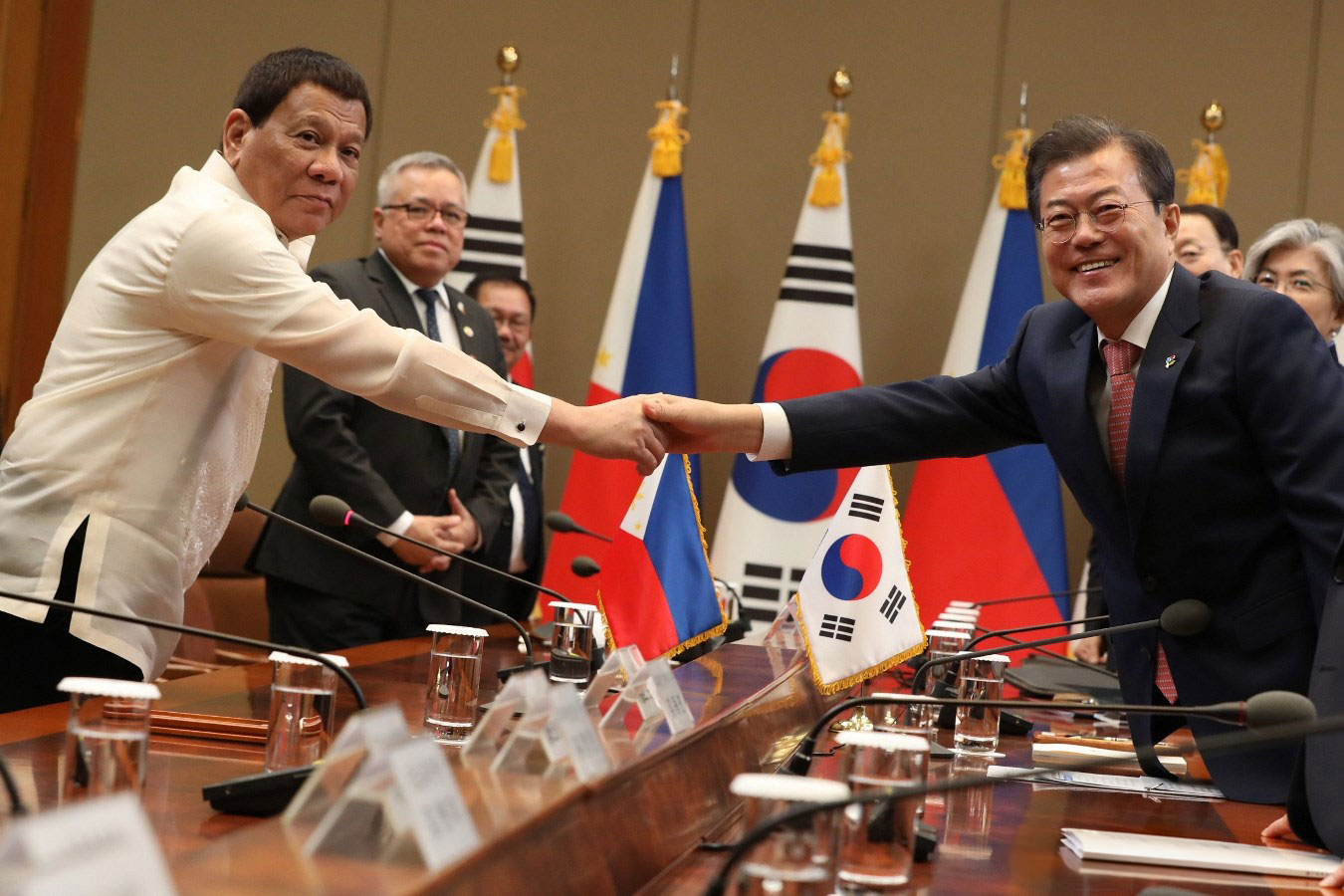
Duterte and South Korean President Moon Jae-in at the Blue House in Seoul on June 4, 2018.

President Duterte is set on an official visit to the Republic of Korea on June 3–5 to meet with President Moon Jae In. However, his visit became controversial when Duterte was filmed kissing a woman, who was actually married, at the stage, sparking condemnation from the leftist and women advocacy groups, particularly GABRIELA in which they slammed the President's actions as "misogynistic" and "sexist". The still-frame of Duterte kissing the woman was shown in the protest in the Philippines as a condemnation the next day.

=== Malaysia (July 15–16) ===
President Rodrigo Duterte has committed to intensifying Manila's defense and security cooperation with the Malaysian government to address terrorist threats and terrorism activities in the ASEAN region following his bilateral meeting with Prime Minister Mahathir Mohamad in Kuala Lumpur on Monday, July 16. His working visit to Malaysia was preceded by his attendance at the fight of Senator and boxing champ Emmanuel “Manny” D. Pacquiao last July 15, 2018, at the Axiata Arena in Kuala Lumpur.

=== Israel and Jordan (September 2–8) ===
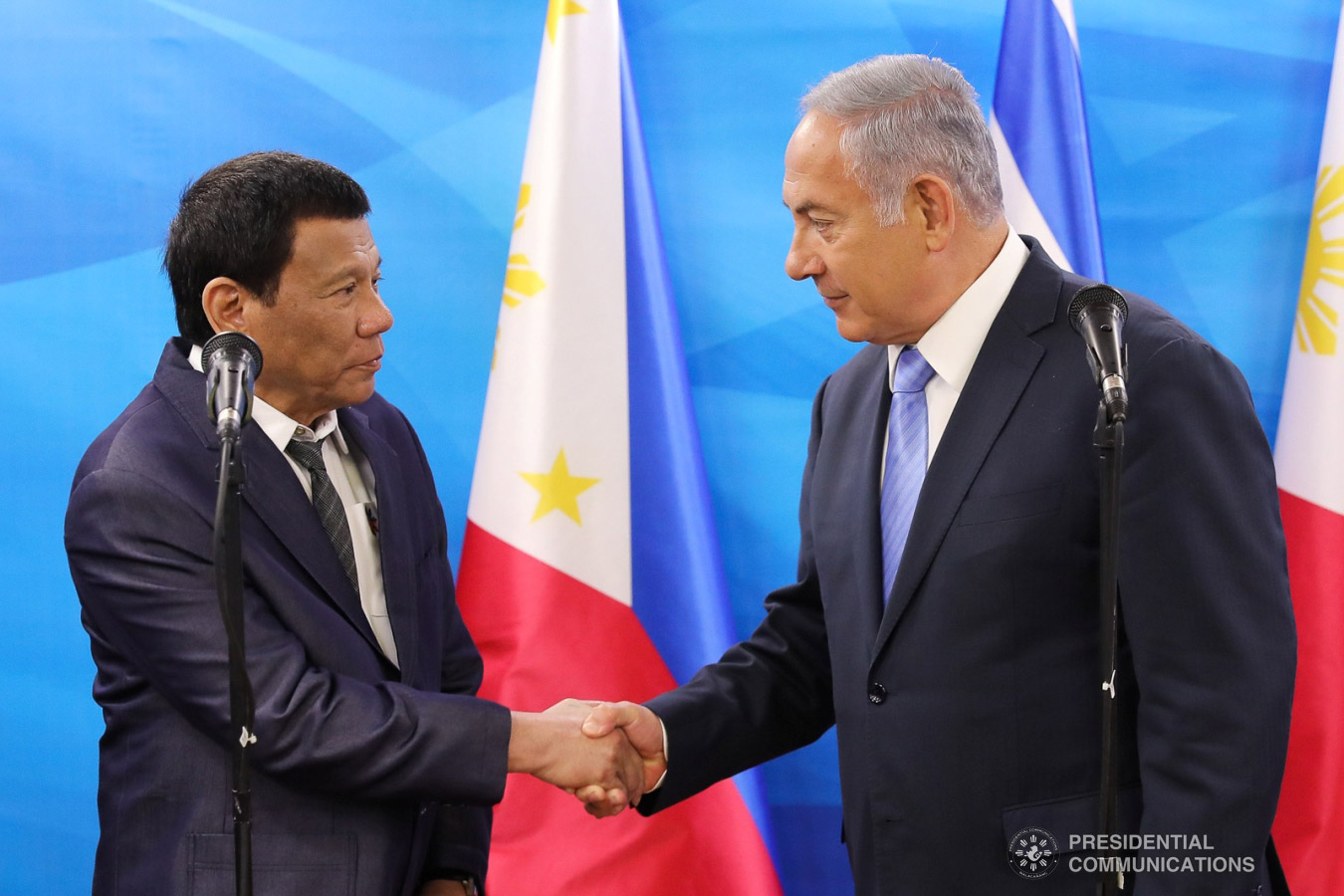
Duterte meets Israeli prime minister Benjamin Netanyahu, during the former's state visit to Israel in 2018

Landmark official visits to the State of Israel and the Hashemite Kingdom of Jordan. President Duterte is the first Philippine president to visit Israel and Jordan. However, while meeting with Israeli President Reuven Rivlin in Jerusalem, it was met by the protests.

=== Indonesia (October 11) ===
President Duterte accepted the invitation of Indonesian president Joko Widodo to attend an informal meeting with leaders of ASEAN in Bali.

=== Singapore (November 13–15) ===
President Duterte attends the 33rd Association of Southeast Asian Nations (ASEAN) Summit.

=== Papua New Guinea (November 15–18) ===
President Duterte attends the APEC Economic Leaders' Summit in Papua New Guinea. The Filipino community, Prime Minister Peter O'Neill and other government leaders was reportedly gripped by excitement about the first visit of Philippine president Rodrigo Duterte in Papua New Guinea. President Duterte is the first Philippine president to visit the southwestern Pacific nation.

== 2019 ==
=== China (April 25–27) ===
President Rodrigo Duterte left for China Wednesday, April 24, afternoon to attend the second Belt and Road Forum amid Manila's concerns over rising tensions with Beijing over the Disputed South China Sea. Duterte is expected to push for Manila's interests in Beijing's global infrastructure plan that could set the stage for the world economic landscape in the years to come. The ambitious Belt and Road Initiative plans to link China with Africa, the rest of Asia, and Europe through a network of ports, railways, roads, and industrial parks. At least 5 agreements are on the table with China covering areas of education, anti-corruption, official development assistance, and drug rehabilitation. Duterte is also one of the lead speakers at the Leaders’ Roundtable, where 39 other heads of state are expected to attend.

In the weeks leading up to Duterte's Beijing return for the second Belt and Road Forum Initiative, reports of Chinese activity in the disputed waters have notably increased. Government has raised concerns over reports of mass harvesting of clams near the Scarborough Shoal and the presence of Chinese vessels near Pag-asa Island, Kota Island, and Panata Island.

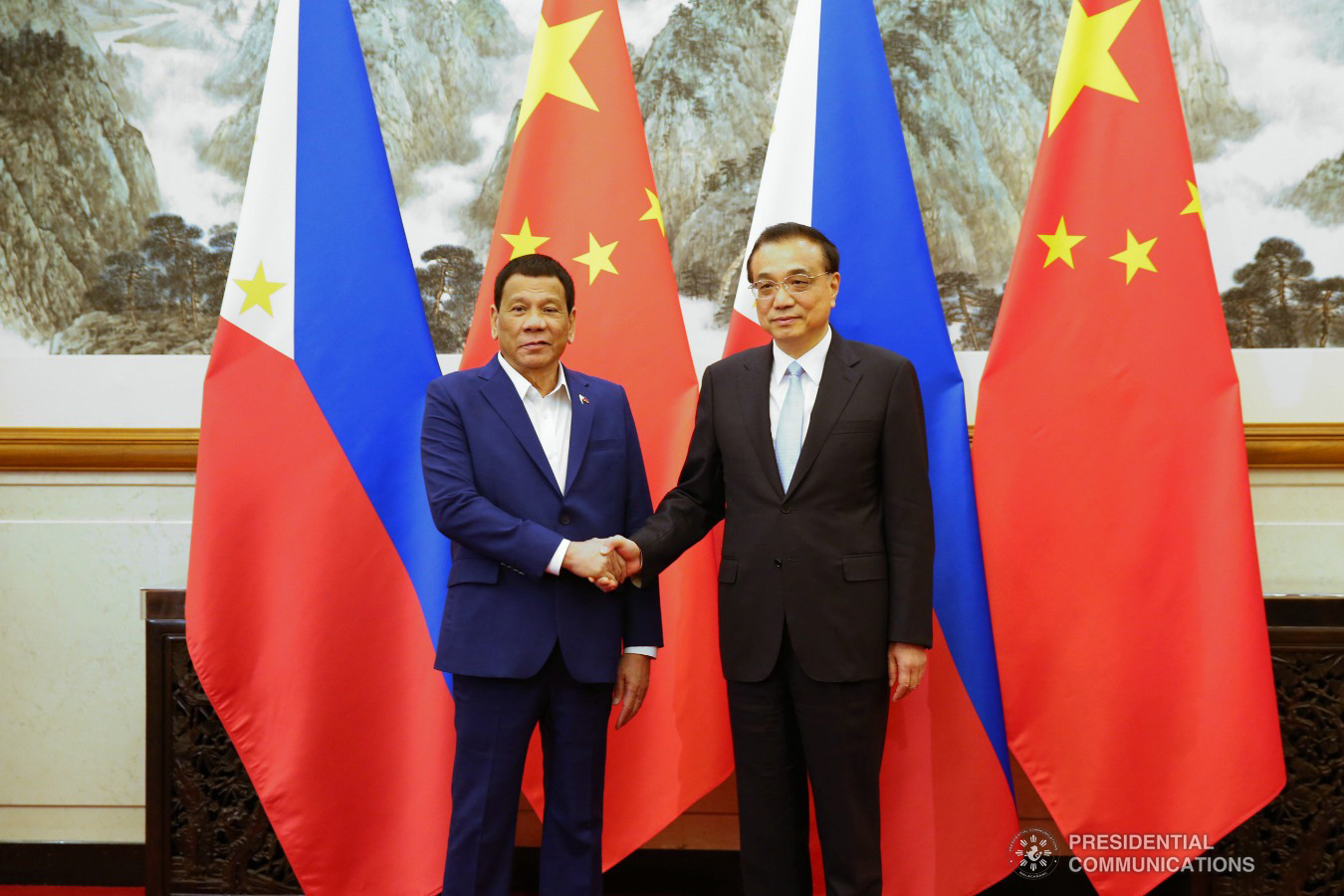
President Rodrigo Duterte during the bilateral meeting with People’s Republic of China State Council Premier Li Keqiang at the Diaoyutai State Guest House in Beijing on April 25, 2019.

President Duterte holds a bilateral meeting with Chinese president Xi Jinping and Chinese premier Li Keqiang. On the sidelines of the 2nd Belt and Road Forum in Beijing, Duterte raised the Permanent Court of Arbitration's ruling favorable to the Philippines' claim and told Beijing of the situation in Philippine-held Pag-asa Island in the South China Sea in his meeting with Chinese president Xi Jinping. Xi countered by saying China did not recognize the arbitral ruling that invalidated the country's historical but excessive claims in the said waters. The arbitral ruling, sought by the Philippines under the Aquino administration, upheld the country's exclusive economic zone. The Philippines remains an ally of China in Southeast Asia but the two nations must strengthen and not destroy each other and agreed to tackle the differences bilaterally. The Chinese leader also cited the proposed oil and gas exploration deal between the Philippines and China during the meeting with Duterte. President Xi cited the Memorandum of Understanding on Oil and Gas as an example where both the Philippines and China suspended their differences for a joint exploration that would mutually benefit both countries and their peoples.

The Philippines has also secured at least $12.165 billion worth of investment and trade deals. President Duterte witnessed the signing of 19 business agreements between Beijing and Manila meant to the fields of energy, infrastructure, food, telecommunications, sale of agricultural products, tourism, and economic zone, and industrial park development which are projected to generate 21,165 jobs for Filipinos. President Rodrigo Duterte along with several of his Cabinet members witnessed the signing of the business agreements.

=== Japan (May 29–31) ===
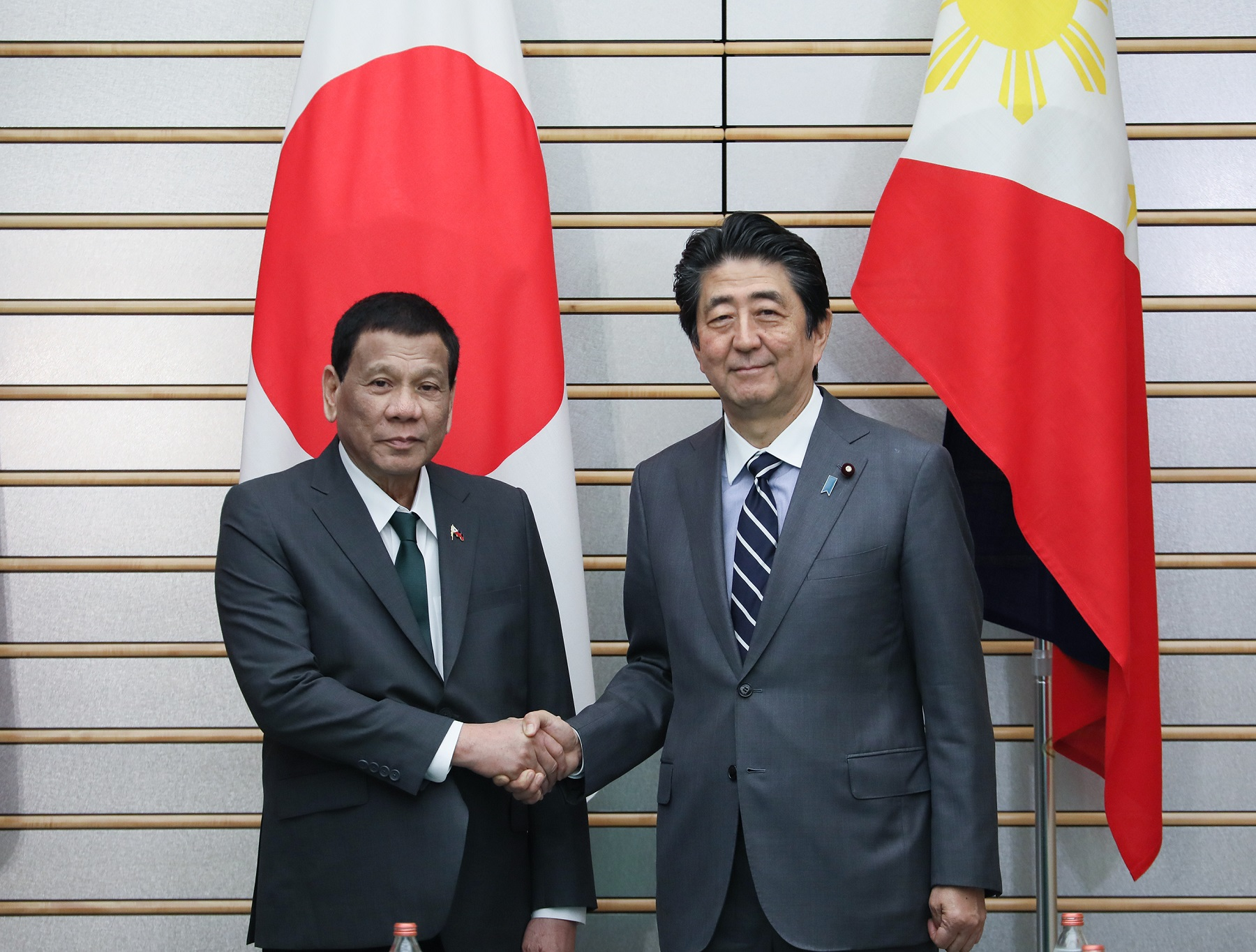
Duterte with Japanese prime minister Shinzo Abe during the former's official visit in Tokyo, May 2019

Duterte arrived in Tokyo, Japan to attend the Nikkei's International Conference on the Future of Asia and the bilateral meeting with Japanese prime minister Shinzō Abe. Duterte also accompanied his 16 Cabinets on his trip as a "reward" for the 2019 midterm elections. However, Malacañang denied that Duterte's trip to Japan is a reward to his Cabinet members.

=== Thailand (June 21–23) ===
President Duterte attends the 34th Association of Southeast Asian Nations (ASEAN) Summit and joins his fellow leaders in discussing a wide range of regional issues. Duterte also attended several important events during the summit, which include the Summit Plenary, Gala Dinner for the leaders, Leaders’ Retreat, and the 13th Brunei Darussalam-Indonesia-Malaysia-Philippines East ASEAN Growth Area (BIMP-EAGA) Summit.

Duterte sought improvements in infrastructure connectivity, as well as in maritime security, to combat terrorism and other threats during the Brunei-Indonesia-Malaysia-Philippines East ASEAN (Association of Southeast Asian Nations) Growth Area or BIMP-EAGA summit in Bangkok. Duterte said there was an “urgent need to increase air linkages for greater people mobility and cross-[border] trade.” Duterte also proposed the establishment of more roll-on/roll-off shipping services in the sub-region during the BIMP-EAGA summit.

On the ASEAN Summit 2019 sidelines; President Rodrigo Duterte urged Thai businessmen to invest more in the Philippines, citing the uptick in the country's economic indicators.

=== China (August 28 – September 1) ===
President Duterte for the fifth time visits Beijing upon the invitation of Chinese president Xi Jinping. This is Pres. Duterte's 8th bilateral meeting with Chinese president Xi Jinping.

The president was initially set to visit a school building in Fujian province built in honor of his late mother, Soledad Duterte, but it was moved to a later date due to “logistical” reasons.

The Palace said Duterte and Xi reaffirmed the friendship between the Philippines and China and committed to further enhance the Comprehensive Strategic Cooperation between the two countries. Issues in the South China Sea including the 2016 ruling by the international arbitral tribunal in The Hague and the drafting of the Code of Conduct (COC) to avoid further tensions in the disputed territory were discussed. The Philippines is the coordinator of the ASEAN-China dialogue partnership, where it leads negotiations in drafting a code of conduct in the South China Sea. Xi, however, underscored China's stand in rejecting the said ruling that favored the Philippines but assured Duterte that China will avoid “provocative acts” in the South China Sea.

In terms of the economic relationship between the Philippines and China, Pres. Duterte met with Premier Li Keqiang who pledged support towards the “Build, Build, Build” Program. Six agreements covering the sectors of education, science and technology, finance, and customs, among others, were signed during the visit. Duterte also attended the opening of the 2019 FIBA Basketball World Cup in China where he also expressed support towards the Philippine national team, Gilas Pilipinas. Gilas Pilipinas, however, lost to Italy with score 108–62.

Duterte also met with his former economic adviser Michael Yang and global superstar Jackie Chan in Beijing.

=== Russia (October 1–5) ===
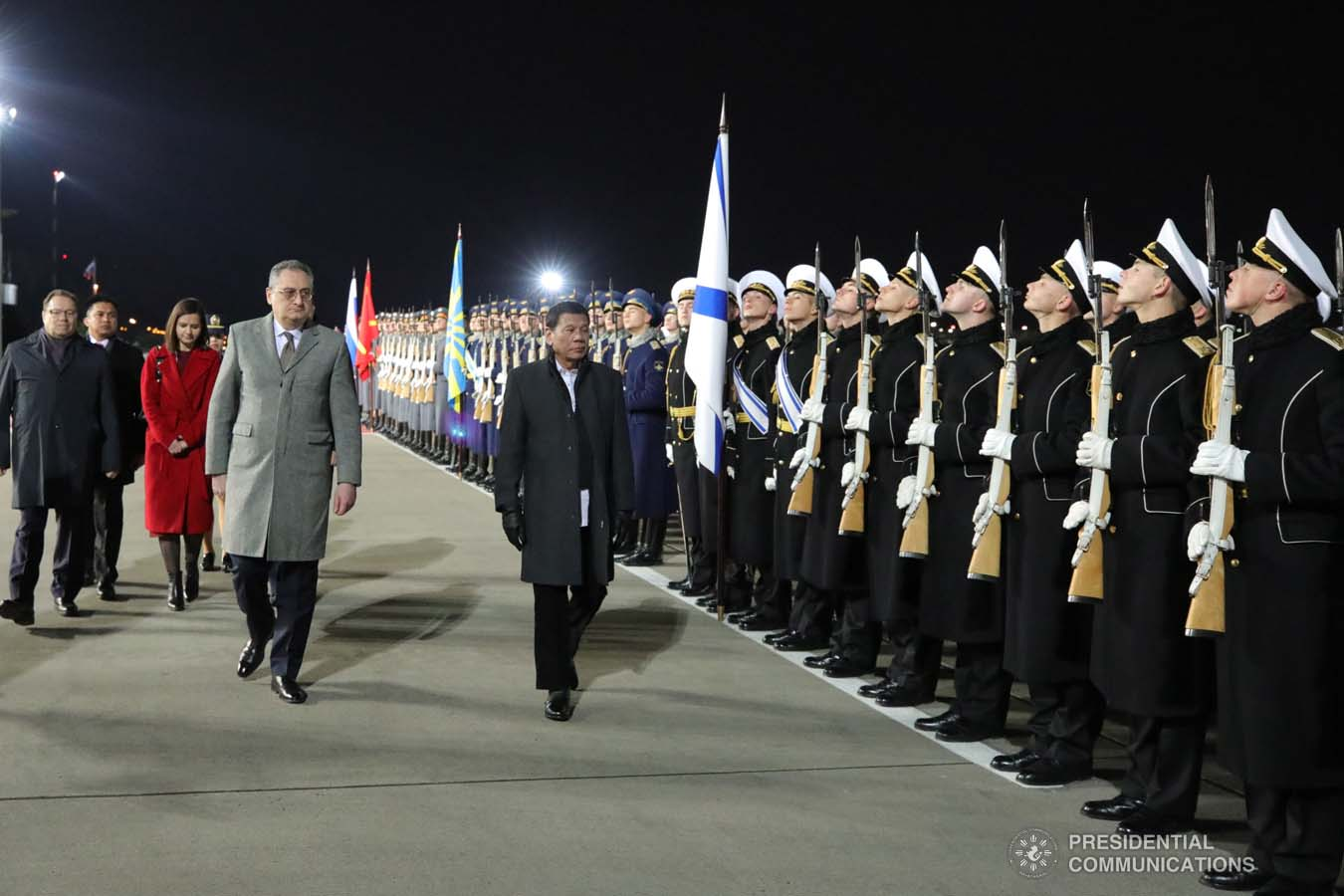
President Rodrigo Duterte is accorded foyer honors as he prepares to depart at the Vnukovo Military Base Airport in Moscow, Russian Federation on October 5, 2019

President Rodrigo Duterte had a five-day visit to the cities of Moscow and Sochi. This is the President's second trip to Russia after his May 2017 visit which was cut short by the deadly terror siege in Marawi City. Duterte's visit includes meetings with Russian president Vladimir Putin, Russian prime minister Dmitry Medvedev, Jordanian King Abdullah II, and chess grandmaster Anatoly Karpov. The two leaders exchanged views on regional and global developments and other issues during their fourth meeting.

Duterte hold talks with Putin to strengthen bilateral relations and witness the signing of 10 bilateral pacts on areas of cooperation such as culture, health, basic research, importation of products to Russia as well as intent to explore the prospect of cooperation to construct nuclear power plants in the Philippines. The president speaks before the Valdai forum which will be attended by politicians and experts from across the world to tackle the topic “The World Order Seen From the East.” The president met with two world leaders on the sidelines of the Valdai forum in the Russian resort city of Sochi. An honorary doctorate degree in diplomacy was conferred on the President by the Moscow State Institute of International Relations University (MGIMO). Duterte delivered remarks at MGIMO, one of Russia's prestigious schools in the area of diplomacy and international affairs.

=== Japan (October 21–22) ===
Duterte's trip to Japan to attend the enthronement of Japanese Emperor Naruhito was cut short due to "unbearable pain" in his spine following a dirt biking accident on October 16, 2019. Duterte made a statement through Bong Go's Facebook live video, saying that he could not bear the pain from the injury. Instead, Sara Duterte represented her father for the trip. Duterte flew back to Manila on the night of October 22, 2019.

=== Thailand (November 1–4) ===
Duterte attended the 35th Association of Southeast Asian Nations (ASEAN) summit held in Nonthaburi, Thailand. A news report stated that Thai King Vajiralongkorn told Duterte to "behave" during his visit and that news was featured on the front page of the Bangkok Post. This was denied by the Malacañang, labelled it "black propaganda" and "cheap political stunt" against the president.

=== South Korea (November 25–27) ===
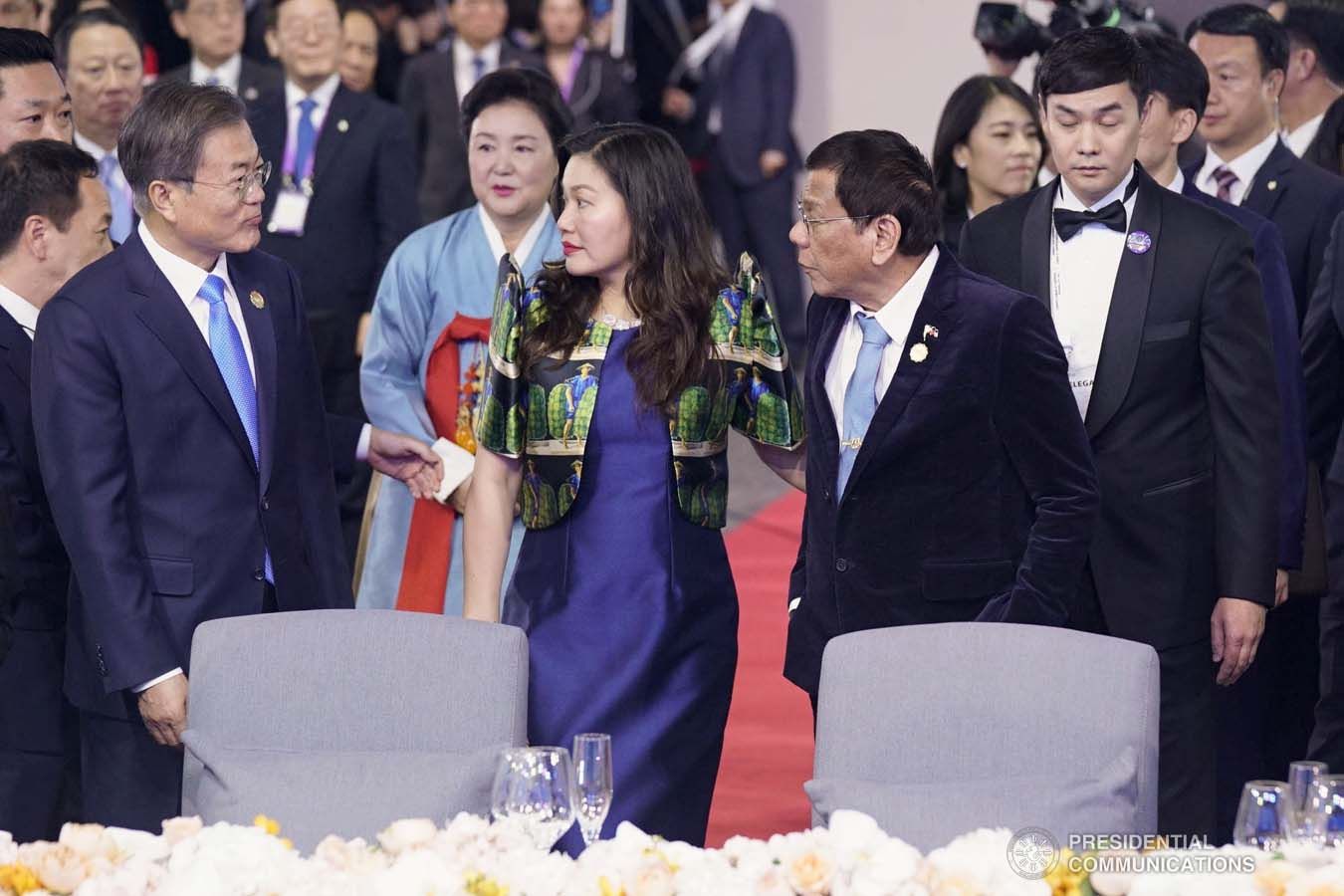
President Rodrigo Duterte and his partner Cielito Avanceña are welcomed by South Korean President Moon Jae-in to the Cruise Grand Ballroom of the Hilton Busan Hotel for the welcome dinner hosted by the South Korean President on November 25, 2019.

President Rodrigo Duterte attends to the ASEAN-Republic of Korea Commemorative Summit in Busan, South Korea. Pres. Duterte had a bilateral meeting with South Korean President Moon Jae-in to discuss a wide spectrum of issues including education, free trade, and fisheries. The summit focused on connectivity and on charting the course of relations between ASEAN and South Korea. Leaders discussed regional and global issues, the denuclearization of North Korea is among the issues tackled during the summit.

The Philippines and South Korea signed four agreements and a joint statement on a proposed free trade deal to further enhance their bilateral ties. President Duterte and South Korean President Moon Jae-in witnessed the signing of an agreement on social security, the implementation program of a memorandum of understanding on tourism cooperation, and a joint statement on the early achievement package of the negotiations on the proposed free trade deal. Two other agreements on education and fisheries were also signed on the sidelines of Duterte's visit.

President Duterte invited South Korean President Moon Jae-in to visit the Philippines next year during their bilateral meeting.

== Multilateral meetings ==
Group	Year					
Group	2016	2017	2018	2019	2020	2021
APEC	November 19–20, (Peru) Lima	November 10–11, (Vietnam) Đà Nẵng	November 17–18, (Papua New Guinea) Port Moresby	November 16–17, (cancelled) (Chile) Santiago	November 20, (virtual) (Malaysia) Kuala Lumpur	November 12, (virtual) (New Zealand) Auckland
ASEAN	September 6–8, (Laos) Vientiane	April 28–29, (Philippines) Pasay	April 27–28, Singapore	June 20–23, (Thailand) Bangkok	April 14 – June 26, (virtual) (Vietnam) Hanoi	October 26–28, (virtual) (Brunei) Bandar Seri Begawan
ASEAN	September 6–8, (Laos) Vientiane	November 13, (Philippines) Pasay	November 14, Singapore	November 1–4, (Thailand) Bangkok	November 12–15, (virtual) (Vietnam) Hanoi	October 26–28, (virtual) (Brunei) Bandar Seri Begawan
EAS	September 6–8, (Laos) Vientiane	November 13–14, (Philippines) Pasay	November 14–15, Singapore	November 4, (Thailand) Bangkok	November 14, (virtual) (Vietnam) Hanoi	October 27, (virtual) (Brunei) Bandar Seri Begawan^{[a]}
Others	None		ASEAN-India Commemorative Summit; January 25–26, New Delhi	Belt and Road Forum; April 25–27, (China) Bo'ao ASEAN–Republic of Korea Commemorative Summit; November 25–27, (South Korea) Busan	UN General Assembly 75th Session; September 21, (virtual) (United States) New York City	UN General Assembly 76th Session; September 22, (virtual) (United States) New York City ASEAN-China Special Summit 30th Anniversary of ASEAN-China Dialogue Relations; November 22, (virtual); Beijing 13th Asia-Europe Meeting Summit; November 25–26, (virtual) (Cambodia) Phnom Penh
██ = Hosted by the Philippines; ██ = Future event ██ = Virtual event; ██ = Did not attend^a Foreign Affairs Secretary Teodoro Locsin Jr. attended in the president's place.

== See also ==
- Foreign relations of the Philippines
- List of international presidential trips made by Benigno Aquino III, his predecessor
- List of international presidential trips made by Bongbong Marcos, his successor
