= Brunei–Philippines relations =

- Brunei: Philippines

Diplomatic mission
- Embassy: Embassy

Envoy
- Ambassador Megawati Manan: Ambassador Marian Jocelyn R. Tirol-Ignacio

Brunei and the Philippines have formal diplomatic relations. Brunei has an embassy in Makati, Metro Manila while the Philippines has an embassy in Bandar Seri Begawan.

== History ==
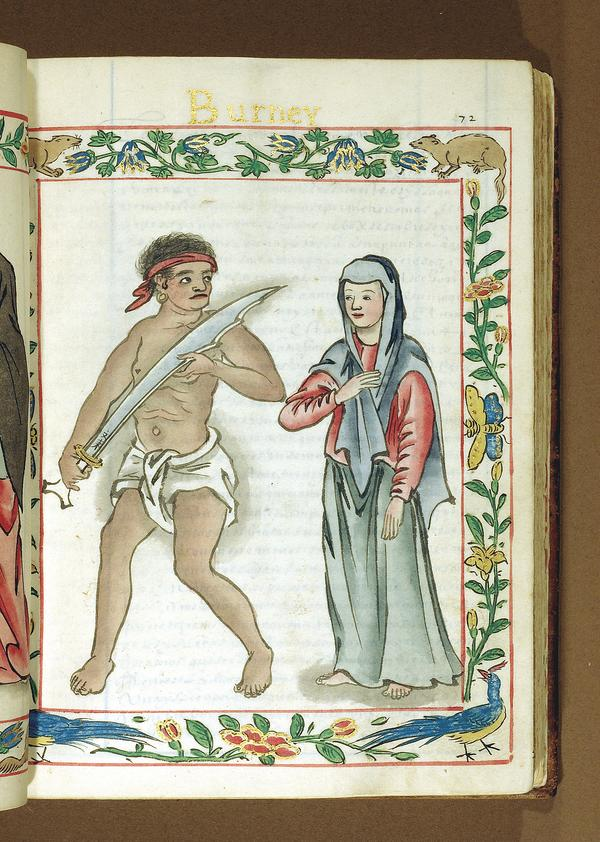
Bruneian warrior and his wife in the Philippines (Boxer Codex, c.1590)

Both Brunei and the Philippines was once part of the Maritime Jade Road. Before the British invasion of Brunei and the Spanish invasion of the Philippines which placed the territory under the Mexico-governed Viceroyalty of New Spain, the Bruneian Empire was overlord over the Philippine kingdoms of the Sultanate of Sulu and the Rajahnate of Maynila as evidenced by the family connections between Rajah Matanda of Manila, Dayang-dayang (Princess) Mechanai of Sulu and Sultan Bolkiah of Brunei. The said kingdoms had diplomatic relations with each other and the kings of these nations formed a regional Malay Muslim Royal clan which interconnected Malacca, Brunei, Pontianak, Samarinda, Banjarmasin, Manila and Sulu. In even earlier times, according to the Yuan annals, "The Gazetteer of the South Sea" compiled during the Dade period of the Yuan Dynasty (Yuan Dade Nanhai zhi 元大德南海志) Brunei (Known as Poni) had alternatingly lost wars against or ruled over several Philippine kingdoms which included: Butuan 蒲端, Sulu سلطنة سولك, Ma-i 麻逸 (Mindoro), Malilu 麻裏蘆/षेलुरोङ् (present-day Manila), Shahuchong 沙胡重 (present-day Siocon), Madja-as otherwise known as Yachen 啞陳 (Oton), and Wenduling 文杜陵/سلطنة ماجينداناو (present-day Mindanao).

Filipinos (then called Luzones) were a favored source of soldiers in the Bruneian royal army, that João de Barros wrote in Décadas da Ásia (John Stevens transl., The History of the Portuguese in India, vol. 3, London 1777) Vol. 3, pp. 102–105 (Década III, Livro I, cap. XIV) Malacca (c. 1525) & Perak, the following:

A fleet of twelve Luçon caracoas under the same leader joined the Brunei armada against Lawé. Their knowledge of these coasts was unmatched, and they bore the brunt of the assault.

Formal diplomatic relations between a unified modern Philippines and a freshly independent Brunei began on 1 January 1984.

== State visits ==
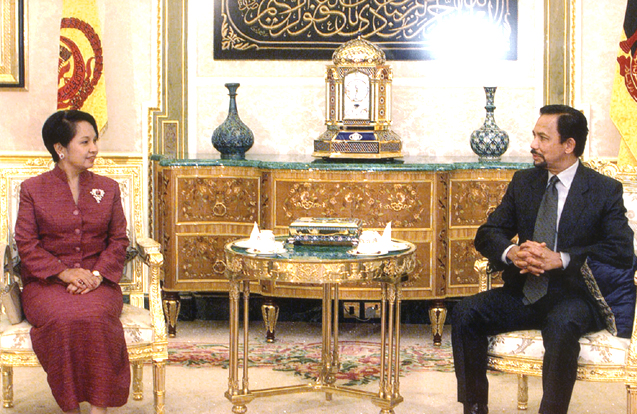
President Gloria Macapagal Arroyo with Sultan Hassanal Bolkiah in Bandar Seri Begawan in 2003

Philippine President Benigno Aquino III, made a state visit to Brunei on 1–2 June 2011 and visited the country again on 23 September 2012 to attend the royal wedding of Princess Hajah Hafizah Sururul Bolkiah.

Sultan Hassanal Bolkiah of Brunei made a state visit on 15–16 April 2013 to the Philippines to discuss Brunei's chairmanship in the ASEAN summit. The sultan thanked President Aquino for the Philippines' support for his country's ASEAN chairmanship. The South China Sea dispute was also on agenda. The Philippines urged Brunei as chair, to prioritise on the conclusion of a code of conduct regarding the issue. Brunei expressed support for the creation of a binding conduct among claimants in the regional dispute and has vowed to pursue the said conduct.

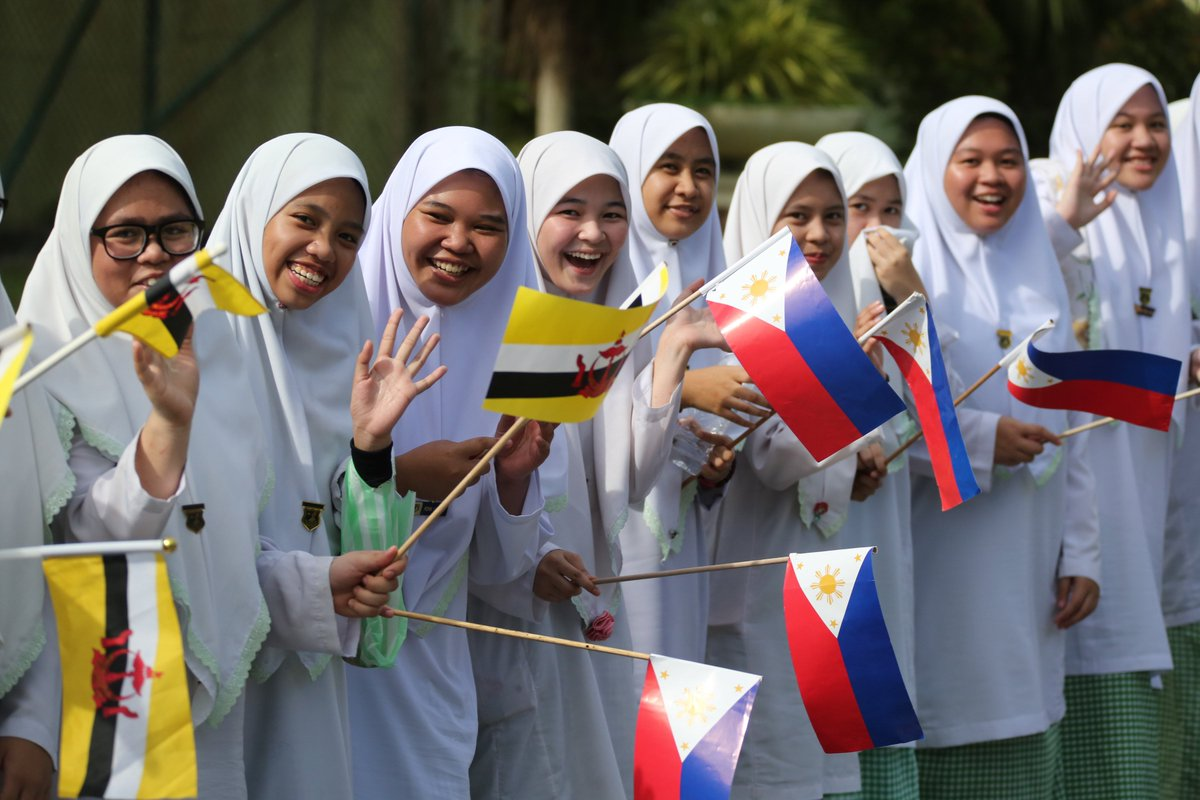
Bruneian students wave the Philippine and Bruneian flags during President Rodrigo Duterte's state visit to the country on 17 October 2016

Philippine President Rodrigo Duterte had his first ever state visit to Brunei before going to the ASEAN summit in Laos in September 2016.

Sultan Hassanal Bolkiah of Brunei returned to the Philippines on 26–29 April 2017 for a state visit and to attend the 30th ASEAN Summit, which the Philippines chaired. The Sultan met with Philippine President Rodrigo Duterte to discuss issues of mutual concern regarding peace and security. The Sultan's most recent visit to the Philippines was from 30 November to 1 December 2019 for an official visit and to attend the opening ceremony of the 2019 Southeast Asian Games.

== Filipinos in Brunei ==
In 1983, there were approximately 8,000 Filipinos working in Brunei, with some of them involved in the construction of the Istana Nurul Iman and other projects of the Bruneian government. As of 2013, there are more than 20,000 Filipinos working in Brunei.

== Issues ==
=== Brunei beauties ===
In 1993, in a diplomatic affair dubbed as the Brunei beauties, Senator Ernesto Maceda claimed that there were illegal recruitment of Filipinas in Brunei as prostitutes and entertainers. Prince Jefri, the brother of Sultan Hassanal Bolkiah were among those linked to the scandal. The Philippine government downplayed the issue and describe it as merely a "Senate affair" to safeguard relations between Brunei and the Philippines.
