= List of international presidential trips made by Benigno Aquino III =

Map of international trips made by Benigno Aquino III as president: 1 visit 2 visits 3 visits 4 visits 5 visits 6 visits 7 or more visits Philippines

This is a list of international presidential trips made by Benigno Aquino III, the 15th president of the Philippines. During his presidency, which began with his inauguration on June 30, 2010 and ended on June 30, 2016, Benigno Aquino III made 40 international trips to 24 countries internationally, including Vatican City. Aquino said he limited his foreign trips in order to focus on domestic issues.

== Countries ==
The number of visits per country where he travelled are:

- One visit to Australia, Belgium, Canada, Germany, Italy, Laos, New Zealand, Russia, Spain, Switzerland, Thailand, the United Kingdom, Vatican City, and Vietnam
- Two visits to Cambodia, China, France, Singapore, and South Korea
- Three visits to Malaysia and Myanmar (Burma)
- Four visits to Brunei
- Five visits to Indonesia
- Six visits to Japan
- Seven visits to the United States

== International visits ==
=== 2010 ===
In 2010, President Aquino made 3 official visits.

United States (September 20 to 26, 2010)

President Aquino attended the 65th United Nations General Assembly and met with US President Barack Obama and leaders of several business sectors in New York City and San Francisco, California. The President talked at the UNGA regarding the status of the Philippine efforts to achieve the UN Millennium Development Goals (MDGs). He also met with members of the Filipino-American communities in both cities.

Vietnam (October 26 to 30, 2010)

President Aquino flew to Hanoi for a two-day State Visit following the personal invitation of Vietnamese President Nguyen Minh Triet. The President met with the Vietnamese President for bilateral talks, Prime Minister Nguyen Tan Dung and with General Secretary of the Communist Party Nong Duc Manh. The visit of the President further strengthened the bilateral ties between the two countries which have grown for the past 34 years. President Aquino also met with the Filipino community living and working in Vietnam who are mostly in higher positions such as managerial and supervisory. After his State Visit, the President participated at the 17th ASEAN Summit and Related Meetings where Vietnam was the current chair. On the sidelines of the summit, the President also had several bilateral meetings with neighboring countries such as Japan, Myanmar, South Korea, and Thailand among others.

Japan (November 12 to 14, 2010)

President Aquino participated at the 18th Asia-Pacific Economic Cooperation (APEC) Economic Leaders' Meeting (AELM) in Yokohama, Japan. With the theme "Change and Action", this year's APEC Summit focuses on Regional Economic Integration, Growth Strategy, Human Security and Economic and Technical Cooperation. The President hold a bilateral meetings with the other Heads of State attending the summit. President Aquino already met with Prime Minister Naoto Kan during the ASEAN Summit in Hanoi, Vietnam last month, as the government of Japan approved a 21.4 billion peso Official Development Assistance (ODA) to fund major infrastructure projects in the Philippines.

=== 2011 ===
In 2011, President Aquino made 11 official visits.

Indonesia and Singapore (March 7 to 11, 2011)

President Aquino embarks on his first state visit to the Republic of Indonesia. He met with Indonesian President Susilo Bambang Yudhoyono and was accorded ceremonial honors befitting a Head of State, such as an official welcome ceremony at the Istana Merdeka (Presidential Palace) and a state banquet at the Istana Negara (State Palace). The President's visit comes at an opportune time as both the Philippines and Indonesia enjoy strong bilateral relations for more than sixty years, marked by frequent exchange of visits by the Heads of State and high-level officials. President Aquino is on a three-day state visit to Singapore, after coming from Indonesia, to likewise strengthen bilateral and regional ties with fellow Association of Southeast Asian Nations member nations. He called on Singaporean President S.R. Nathan and met Prime Minister Lee Hsien Loong to discuss government's Public-Private Partnership (PPP) initiatives and various issues of bilateral and regional concern. The President also served as keynote speaker in the Singapore Business Forum/International Enterprise Singapore Eminent Leaders Lecture entitled "Philippines-Partnership for Progress" and the Ho Rih Hwa Leadership in Asia Public Lecture Series at the Singapore Management University. He also met members of the Filipino community and toured the Changi Water Reclamation Plant. At the Singapore Botanic Gardens, a new orchid breed was named after the visiting President as part of courtesies.

Indonesia (May 7 to 8, 2011)

President Aquino returned to Indonesia to attend the 18th ASEAN Leaders' Meeting. With the theme "Towards an ASEAN Community in a Global Community of Nations," the agenda focuses on a people-centered ASEAN: A Caring and Sharing Community adopted during the 12th ASEAN summit that was held in the Philippines last 2006. Some of the topics that will be discussed by the ten (10) member countries include the enhancement of sub-regional cooperation and narrowing its development gap, the critical role of Private-Public Partnership (PPP) and the ASEAN single window in which the Philippines will maximize the opportunities provided by the ASEAN economic integration through the free trade areas (FTAs). The meeting will also expedite the expansion of the East Asian Summit and other priority concerns such as maritime security, transnational crime, human rights and democracy.

Thailand (May 26 to 27, 2011)

President Aquino undertook his first official visit to the Kingdom of Thailand to meet with Thai Prime Minister Abhisit Vejjajiva. The Chief Executive was accorded with ceremonial honours befitting a head of state like an official welcome ceremony at the Government House in Dusit, Bangkok. The Philippines and Thailand celebrated 62 years of bilateral relations on June 14 and the visit is expected to further strengthen the mutual ties between the two countries. It will also enhance Thai investments in the Philippines as well as boost Filipino companies present in Bangkok. The President was given an honoris causa degree in Economics by Kasetsart University, the first agricultural university and the third oldest university in Thailand. President Aquino met with the Filipino community in Bangkok.

Brunei (June 1 to 2, 2011)

President Aquino conducts a two-day state visit to Brunei Darussalam, following his successful trip to Thailand, to further strengthen bilateral relations with the Sultanate. The President will be received by His Royal Highness The Crown Prince Al-Muhtadee Billah upon his arrival at Bandar Seri Begawan International Airport, and will be given welcoming honors at Istana Nurul Iman, where he will be introduced to the Royal Family and the Grand Chamberlain. The President is also set to have an audience with His Majesty Sultan Haji Hassanal Bolkiah. President Aquino met with some Bruneian businessmen and with the Filipino community here. He will also visit the New Philippine Embassy Chancery, where he will unveil the commemorative marker as part of the inaugural activities.

Japan (August 4 to 5, 2011)

President Aquino held a one-on-one meeting with MILF chairman Al Haj Murad Ibrahim and met other Filipino Muslim rebel groups, discussing peace process in Mindanao.

China (August 30 to September 3, 2011)

President Aquino embarked on a four-day state visit to the People's Republic of China. The visit was upon the invitation of President Hu Jintao, aimed to strengthen bilateral relations and to promote a people-centered partnership between the Philippines and China. President Aquino first visited Beijing, where he met with President Hu, Chairman Wu Bangguo and Premier Wen Jiabao. He also had a series of meetings with businessmen and witnessed the signing of several Memoranda of Understanding (MOU) in the areas of trade, investments, media, culture, education and tourism. In Shanghai, President Aquino convened with the civic officials led by the local Chinese Communist Party Committee Secretary, Yu Zhengsheng. He spoke before Yangtze River Delta Economic Zone officials and other business enterprise managers in a high-level forum. The President also welcomed possible trade investments during his meeting with various Filipino and Chinese businessmen based in Shanghai. On the last leg of his state visit, President Aquino went to Xiamen, Fujian, where he met with local officials before visiting Hongjian Village, the ancestral seat of the Cojuangco Family. There, he offered incense at the ancestral temple and interacted with some of his distant relatives.

United States (September 18 to 21, 2011)

President Aquino heads to New York and Washington DC for a Working Visit to the United States of America. In New York, President Aquino participated in the launching of the Open Government Partnership (OGP) upon the invitation of United States President Barack Obama. OGP is a new multilateral initiative that aims to secure concrete commitments from governments to promote transparency, empower citizens, fight corruption and harness new technologies to strengthen governance. The Philippines is one of 2 Asian countries that is part of the 8-country steering committee of the OGP. The President hold several business meetings in New York and lead the ringing of the opening bell at the New York Stock Exchange. In Washington DC, President Aquino delivered a public lecture at the 2011 Annual Meetings of the World Bank Group and the International Monetary Fund, as well as meet with United States Senator Daniel Inouye and the Filipino Community from the District of Columbia (DC), Virginia and Maryland. At a recent press briefing, the President said that "the drives we have already been achieving in the Philippines are already being highlighted by World Bank."

Japan (September 25 to 28, 2011)

President Aquino embarks on his second official visit to Japan to further strengthen diplomatic ties and elevate trade and economic relations, as well as socio-cultural, with one of the country's most cordial and dynamic partners in the region. The President's visit is set to focus on the promotion of the Philippines to investors, discussions on the use of nuclear energy and political-security issues, particularly the territorial disputes in the South China Sea, and other things of interests to both countries. President Aquino gave a keynote speech on the Philippine Economic Forum to inform the Japanese business community of investment opportunities and the renewed business climate under his administration. President Aquino's engagement includes a state call on Emperor Akihito and a bilateral meeting with Prime Minister Yoshihiko Noda. He thanked Japan for its continuing assistance to the Philippines and wants to return the favour when he visits the Ishinomaki City in Miyagi. President Aquino met with top business leaders in Japan, members of the Filipino community, high-level officials of the Japan-Philippines Economic Cooperation Committee (JPECC), International Friendship Exchange Council, and Japan Ship-owners' Association is also included among his official activities.

United States (November 11 to 12, 2011)

President Aquino participates at the APEC Summit in Honolulu.

Indonesia (November 17 to 19, 2011)

President Aquino participates at the 19th ASEAN Summit in Bali.

=== 2012 ===
In 2012, President Aquino made 9 official visits.

Cambodia (April 2 to 4, 2012)

President Aquino participated at the 20th Association of Southeast Asian Nations (ASEAN) Summit and the Celebration of the 45th Anniversary of ASEAN in Phnom Penh. He joined with other leaders of ASEAN member-countries in the discussions, where North Korea's planned long-range missile launch will most likely to be discussed, as well as other issues of mutual concerns. The President had a coffee meeting with the Philippine media covering the summit on April 3 and met the Filipino community in Cambodia on his third day of visit here.

United Kingdom and United States (June 4 to 10, 2012)

President Aquino had a bilateral meeting with British Prime Minister David Cameron when he visited London. Both leaders discussed Philippines-U.K political and economic cooperation, the U.K's participation in the International Contact Group, regional and international issues, and anti-corruption and good governance practices of both the Philippine and U.K governments. The President also met Prince Andrew, Duke of York. U.S President Barack Obama welcomed President Aquino to the White House. The Philippines is a long-standing friend and ally of the United States. The two leaders discussed ways to deepen bilateral cooperation.

Russia (September 8 to 10, 2012)

President Aquino attended the APEC Russia 2012 in Vladivostok.

Brunei (September 23, 2012)

President Aquino attended the wedding of the daughter of Sultan Hassanal Bolkiah, Princess Hajah Hafizah Sururul Bolkiah.

New Zealand and Australia (October 22 to 26, 2012)

President Aquino embarks on a state visit to New Zealand and Australia, the President held a meeting with Prime Minister John Key, Governor-General Quentin Bryce and Prime Minister Julia Gillard.

Laos (November 5 to 6, 2012)

President Aquino attended the 10th ASEAN-Europe Meeting (ASEM) in Vientiane.

Cambodia (November 18 to 20, 2012)

President Aquino attended the 21st ASEAN Summit in Phnom Penh.

=== 2013 ===
In 2013, President Aquino made 7 official visits.

Switzerland (January 24 to 27, 2013)

President Aquino attended the 2013 World Economic Forum in Davos.

Brunei (April 24 to 25, 2013)

President Aquino attended the 22nd ASEAN Summit in Bandar Seri Begawan.

Myanmar (June 7 to 8, 2013) President Aquino attended the World Economic Forum on East Asia in Naypyidaw.

Indonesia and Brunei (October 6 to 10, 2013)

President Aquino attended the APEC Indonesia 2013 in Bali, the 23rd ASEAN Summit and the 8th East Asia Summit in Bandar Seri Begawan.

South Korea (October 17 to 18, 2013)

State visit, the President met with President Park Geun-hye.

Japan (December 12 to 14, 2013)

President Aquino attended the 40th ASEAN-Japan Commemorative Summit in Tokyo.

=== 2014 ===
In 2014, President Aquino made 13 official visits.

Malaysia (February 27 to 28, 2014)

State visit, meeting with Malaysian Prime Minister Najib Razak focusing on the Comprehensive Agreement on the Bangsamoro. He also attended the Business Opportunities Forum.

Myanmar (May 10 to 11, 2014)

President Aquino attended the 24th ASEAN Summit in Naypyidaw.

Japan (June 24, 2014)

On June 24, 2014, President Aquino undertook a one-day working visit to Japan that cost ₱8.8 million. He first travelled to Tokyo to meet with Prime Minister Shinzō Abe at his official residence for a summit meeting, working lunch, and a joint press conference. During their 45-minute meeting, President Aquino and Prime Minister Abe discussed ways to strengthen their nations' strategic cooperation with the intensifying tensions over the territorial disputes in the South China Sea, where the Prime Minister had agreed to urge the reinterpretation of Article 9 of the Japanese Constitution which would allow the Japan Self-Defense Forces to assist in defending Japan's allies, to which the President expressed support. He later travelled to Hiroshima to address the "Consolidation for Peace for Mindanao" conference organized by the Japan International Cooperation Agency and the Research and Education for Peace council from the Universiti Sains Malaysia. The conference expressed Japan's support over the peace process with Bangsamoro. In his address, President Aquino thanked Japan for their support and associated the peace process with the atomic bombings of Hiroshima and Nagasaki that occurred during World War II nearly seventy years prior. After addressing the conference, the President visited the Hiroshima Peace Memorial Park, where he laid a wreath at the Memorial Cenotaph and toured the Hiroshima Peace Memorial Museum, before departing for Manila later that evening.

Spain, Belgium, France, Germany and United States (September 14 to 24, 2014)

On his European trip, President Aquino travelled to Madrid (September 14–15), Brussels (September 15–17), Paris (September 17–19), and Berlin (September 19–20) to enhance bilateral and economic cooperation between the Philippines and the countries of the said cities. After his European trip, President Aquino travelled across the Atlantic Ocean to the United States for a working visit in Boston (September 20–22), New York City (September 22–24), and San Francisco (September 24), where he also attended the United Nations Climate Summit in New York upon the invitation of Secretary-General Ban Ki-moon and U.S. President Barack Obama.

On Sunday, September 14, President Aquino and his delegation arrived at Torrejón Air Base in Madrid at approximately 7:22 am CEST. He met with former Prime Minister José María Aznar, witnessed the signing of a memorandum of understanding for the Madrid Fusión-Manila gastronomic event to be held in Manila in April 2015, and laid a wreath at the Rizal Monument, a replica of the original monument in Manila. He also addressed the Filipino community in Spain at the Colegio Nuestra Señora de las Maravillas. After, President Aquino held a series of business meetings with seven Spanish firms, namely Acciona, Abengoa, Indra Sistemas, Globalvia, Grupo ACS, INECO, and Calidad Pascual. Finally, President Aquino addressed the Networking with the Philippine Business Delegation event, where he urged investment in the Philippines.

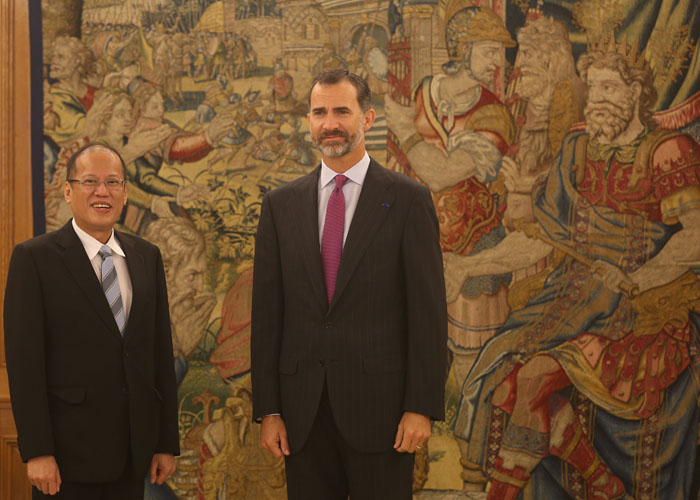
President Aquino meeting with King Felipe VI of Spain in Madrid on September 15, 2014.

On Monday, September 15, President Aquino met with Prime Minister Mariano Rajoy at Palacio de La Moncloa to discuss bilateral economic cooperation with the economic growth of both their countries. During their bilateral meeting, President Aquino informed Prime Minister Rajoy of the situations regarding the territorial disputes in the South China Sea, urging support over the Philippines' proposed Triple Action Plan, and thanked the Prime Minister for Spain's provision of aid to the victims of Super Typhoon Haiyan (Yolanda), the Zamboanga City crisis, and the 2013 Bohol earthquake. The two heads of government also discussed efforts to cease illegal, unreported and unregulated fishing and a bilateral air transport agreement to allow non-stop flights between the two countries. President Aquino then headed to the Palace of Zarzuela to meet with King Felipe VI. At around noon, President Aquino and his delegation headed to Torrejón Air Base to depart Madrid for Brussels, arriving in Brussels at around 2:05 pm CEST. After arriving, President Aquino visited the Berlaymont building, the headquarters of the European Commission, to meet with European Commission President José Manuel Barroso and seek support from the European Union to peacefully resolve the territorial disputes in the South China Sea. The two presidents also discussed the Philippines' cooperation with the European Commission's Directorate-General for Maritime Affairs and Fisheries to "prevent, deter and eliminate" illegal, unreported and unregulated fishing. Later that afternoon, President Aquino met with King Philippe at the Royal Palace of Brussels. President Aquino thanked King Philippe for Belgium's support in the rehabilitation of the damage caused by Super Typhoon Haiyan (Yolanda) and their support over the Bangsamoro peace process. In the evening, President Aquino met with around 800 members of the Filipino communities in Belgium and Luxembourg at the Cathedral of St. Michael and St. Gudula.

On Tuesday, September 16, President Aquino met with European Council President Herman Van Rompuy to discuss the cooperation between the Philippines and the European Union with the signing of the Partnership and Cooperation Agreement, the Bangsamoro peace process, the Maritime Security Strategy, and the European Union's contributions to resolving the territorial disputes in the South China Sea. After their meeting, President Aquino met with Prime Minister Elio Di Rupo at the Prime Minister's official residence in Rue de la Loi, where the two heads of government discussed trade relations. In the afternoon, President Aquino participated at a conference organized by the Philippine Department of Trade and Industry in association with Eurochambres and Friends of Europe, aimed at urging Belgian businesses to invest in the Philippines' public-private partnership programs. He later held a series of business meetings with officials from Royal Dutch Shell, HSBC, and Asia House. In the evening, President Aquino headed to the Château of Val-Duchesse to meet with the Egmont Institute. Upon arriving at the chateau, the President's convoy was greeted by protesters from Migrante Europe and other Filipino human rights organizations, who demand his resignation after "four years of massive corruption, blatant subservience to US imperialist dictates and brutal leadership," according to Migrante Europe chairman Garry Martinez. Upon meeting with the Egmont Institute, the President delivered a speech on addressing local and global issues through international cooperation.

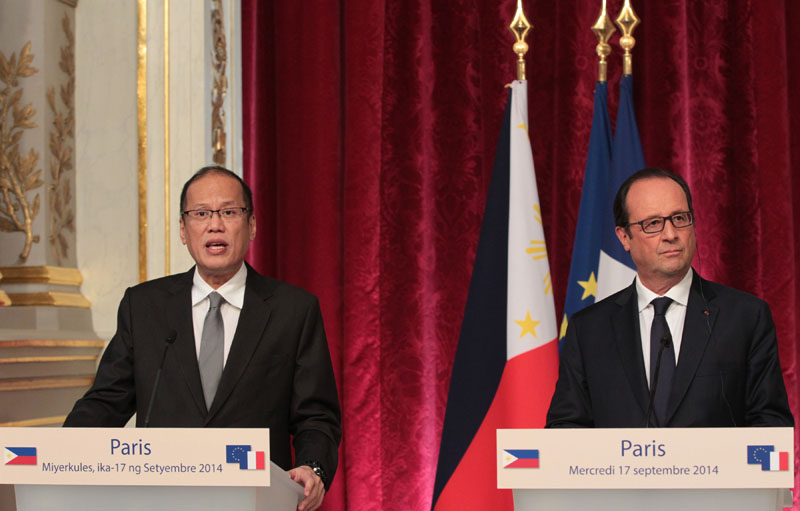
President Aquino with French President François Hollande at a joint press conference in Paris on September 17, 2014.

On Wednesday, September 17, President Aquino and his delegation departed Brussels and arrived at Paris Orly Airport at around 10:05 am CEST. President Aquino's visit to France, the first of a Philippine President since President Fidel V. Ramos's visit in 1994, was aimed to "reap economic, political and cultural gains" to enhance bilateral cooperation between the two countries, according to French Ambassador Gilles Garachon. After arriving, the President attended a wreath laying ceremony with military honors at the Tomb of the Unknown Soldier under the Arc de Triomphe. President Aquino then headed to the Élysée Palace to meet with President François Hollande. During their bilateral meeting, the two presidents discussed ways to enhance bilateral cooperation and efforts to alleviate climate change. President Hollande also expressed his support to resolve the territorial disputes in the South China Sea. The two presidents later witnessed the signing of bilateral agreements on air services, education, and cultural ties, before participating in a working lunch and a joint press conference. After his meeting with President Hollande, President Aquino held business meetings with executives from Airbus, Schneider Electric, and Teleperformance. He later met with Prime Minister Manuel Valls at Hôtel Matignon to discuss the Filipino community in France and their contributions to the French economy. In the evening, the President met with and addressed the Filipino community in France at Chapelle Sainte Bernadette.

On Thursday, September 18, President Aquino participated in the Philippines–France Business Leaders' Roundtable, where he met with 20 Filipino and French business executives to discuss ways to improve bilateral trade and investment, as well as to promote business opportunities for both countries. After, the President addressed the Philippine Business Opportunities Forum at the InterContinental Paris Le Grand Hotel. In his speech, he urged French businesses to invest in the Philippines, saying that the current state of the Philippine economy has been appreciated as a "renaissance" from an economy that was "kept in the darkness of apathy and hopelessness by an administration motivated only by self-service, as opposed to public service." At the hotel, the President also met with officials from the Ayala Corporation, Alstom–Bouygues, and the Egis Group to discuss their expansion plans in the Philippines, having worked on the South Extension of the Manila Light Rail Transit System Line 1. President Aquino later toured the European Headquarters of Dassault Systèmes in Vélizy-Villacoublay. In the evening, President Aquino addressed a forum organized by the Institut français des relations internationales. The President also toured the Louvre later that evening.

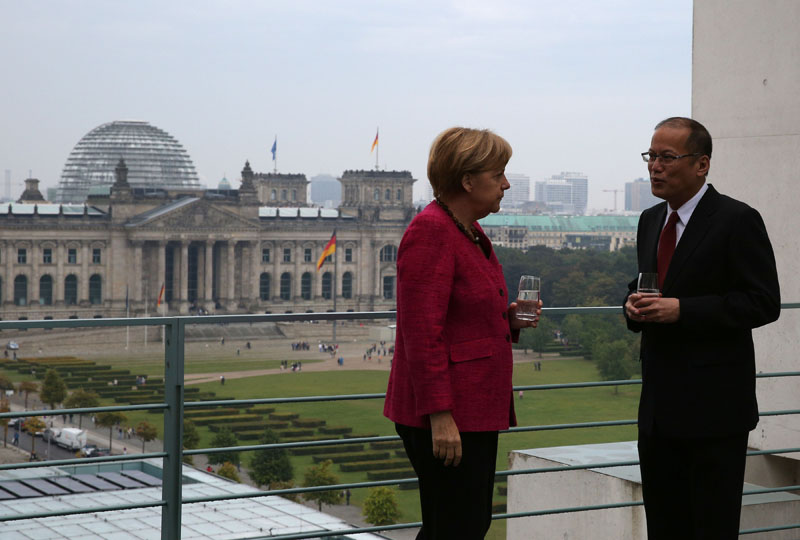
President Aquino converses with German Chancellor Angela Merkel at the balcony of the German Chancellery, overlooking Berlin, on September 19, 2014.

On Friday, September 19, President Aquino and his delegation departed Paris for Berlin, the last stop of his European trip before heading to the United States. He arrived at Berlin Tegel Airport at around 10:45 am CEST. From there, the President travelled to the German Chancellery to meet with Chancellor Angela Merkel, where he was given military honors. During their meeting, Chancellor Merkel agreed to support the Philippines in resolving the territorial disputes in the South China Sea upon President Aquino's request. They also witnessed the signing of bilateral agreements on social security, skills training, and trade, which was followed by a working lunch and a joint press statement. After, President Aquino headed to the Bellevue Palace to meet with President Joachim Gauck. Later that afternoon, President Aquino met with officials from SAP SE, before addressing a policy forum organized by Körber-Stiftung and the Asia-Pacific Committee of German Business. He later witnessed the signing of a health care agreement between the Ayala Corporation and Siemens and met with officials from Knauf, Investor AB, Saab Group, and Stihl, as well as former Federal Minister of Economic Affairs and Energy Michael Glos. In the evening, the President met with the Filipino community in Germany.

On Saturday, September 20, President Aquino visited the Philippine embassy in Berlin, where he was awarded a Freedom Medal from the Friedrich Naumann Foundation for "his successful reforms in the areas of education, anti-corruption and rule of law." Before departing Berlin for the United States, the President toured the Berlin Hauptbahnhof and the Berlin Wall. President Aquino and his delegation departed Berlin Tegel Airport at around 6:30 pm CEST, ending his week-long European trip with $2.3 billion worth of investment pledges to the Philippines from 19 European-based companies. He arrived at the Logan International Airport in Boston at approximately 8:33 pm EDT, beginning his four-day working visit to the United States. It marked the President's first visit to Boston since the assassination of his father, former Senator Ninoy Aquino, in 1983 upon returning from exile in Boston.

On Sunday, September 21, President Aquino first met with family friends for a private lunch. In the afternoon, he visited Boston College where he celebrated Mass at the college's Parish of St. Ignatius of Loyola and attended a convocation with the local Filipino-American community. In his speech, the President updated the community on improvements made in the Philippines regarding the economy, education, and liability of officials, among others. He also recalled moments from his family's three-year exile in Boston, which he calls his "formative years".

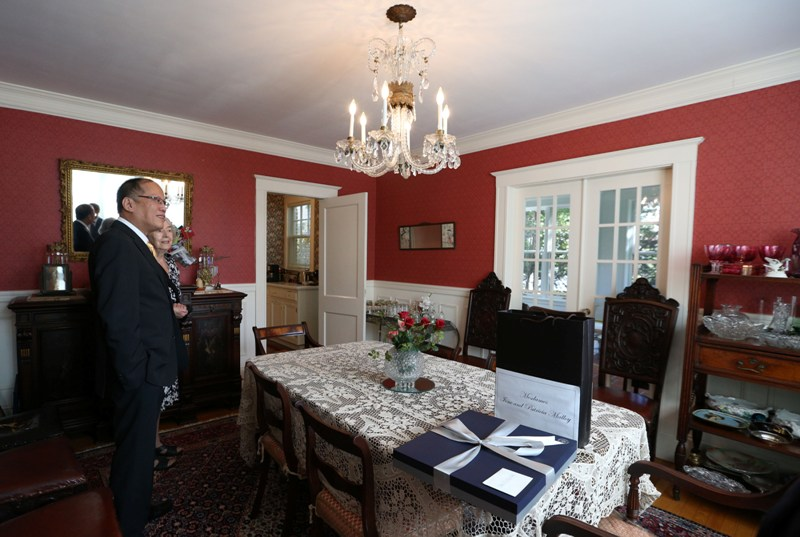
President Aquino revisits his former residence in Chestnut Hill, Massachusetts on September 22, 2014.

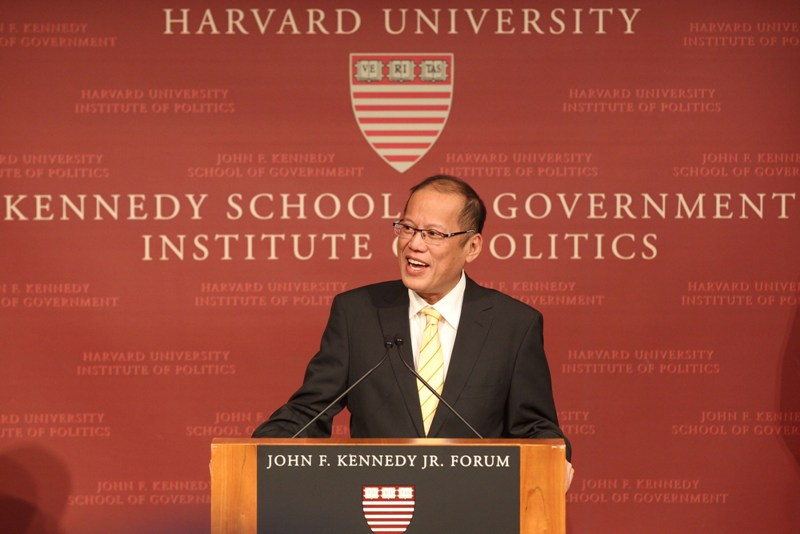
President Aquino delivers a speech at a public forum at the John F. Kennedy School of Government in Cambridge, Massachusetts on September 22, 2014.

On Monday, September 22, President Aquino dined with Representative Joseph P. Kennedy III at a local pizzeria in Newton. The President then visited his former neighborhood in Chestnut Hill, where he visited his former residence, met with its current owner, as well as former neighbors. Later that afternoon, President Aquino was interviewed by radio journalist Jeremy Hobson on his program Here and Now on WBUR-FM, where he was asked on his response to climate change, ahead of the United Nations Climate Summit, and the threat of the Islamic State of Iraq and the Levant. In the evening, President Aquino delivered a policy speech at the John F. Kennedy School of Government at Harvard University, where he discussed how the school's teachings shaped the skills of many Filipino politicians in his administration, including several members of his Cabinet, to work towards redeveloping the Philippines from the effects of former President Ferdinand Marcos's administration with the declaration of martial law to the administration of his predecessor Gloria Macapagal Arroyo, saying: "Like JFK, Ninoy, and Cory, each one has the capacity to dream, to die, to live, to fight, to stand for something, to ask 'why not' when the challenges seem insurmountable. Thus can we transform the world for the better." After his speech, President Aquino and his delegation departed Boston for New York City, arriving at the Newark Liberty International Airport at approximately 8:27 pm EDT, where he was greeted by Philippine Ambassador to the United Nations Libran N. Cabactulan.

On the morning of Tuesday, September 23, President Aquino headed to the United Nations Headquarters to participate in the United Nations Climate Summit. In his four-minute speech, the President urged the international community to assist the Philippines, a major victim to the effects of climate change being frequently visited by typhoons, in combating climate change through funding and the provision of technology, saying: "We [the Philippines] have never lacked in resolve. What we lack is the access to technology, financing, and investment that would allow us to accelerate our strategy." Following the summit, President Aquino participated in a round table discussion with business executives from the U.S. Chamber of Commerce, the US-ASEAN Business Council, and the US-Philippines Society to discuss economic expansion and investment in the Philippines. Later that day, President Aquino participated in the World Leaders Forum at the Low Memorial Library of Columbia University, where he delivered a speech and answered questions from the audience. In his speech, the President spoke on the importance of reforms to address challenges faced constantly by the Philippines. While answering an audience member's question, President Aquino was interrupted by at least three protesters who demanded a response from the President regarding alleged acts of impunity in the Philippines and corruption over Typhoon Haiyan aid. President Aquino refused to respond and Columbia University President Lee Bollinger apologized over the incident.

On the last day of his trip, Wednesday, September 24, President Aquino and his delegation departed Newark and travelled across the United States for a brief visit to San Francisco, the last stop of his working visit to the United States. He arrived at San Francisco International Airport at approximately 9:38 am PDT. In San Francisco, President Aquino held business meetings with senior officials from Caesars Entertainment Corporation, International Development, and Wells Fargo. Outside the Wells Fargo headquarters on Haight Street, President Aquino was met by protesters from Filipino-American communities in California, the largest of Filipino-American communities in the United States, who were disappointed by the President's decision to decline their invitation and prioritize business meetings, instead of meeting with the community. President Aquino and his delegation departed San Francisco for Manila at around 4:40 pm PDT, ending his 10-day trip to Europe and the United States.

Indonesia (October 9 to 10, 2014)

President Aquino attended the 7th Bali Democracy Forum in Nusa Dua, Bali. He, along with Indonesian President Susilo Bambang Yudhoyono, co-chaired the forum aimed at reinforcing democracy in the region. On the sidelines of the forum, President Aquino was awarded the Bintang Republik Indonesia Adipurna ("Star of the Republic of Indonesia") by President Yudhoyono, the highest award honored by the Government of Indonesia, becoming the first Filipino to receive such award.

China and Myanmar (November 9 to 13, 2014)

President Aquino travelled to Beijing to attend the 26th APEC Summit (November 9–11) and Naypyidaw to attend the 25th ASEAN Summit and the Ninth East Asia Summit (November 11–13). The summit meetings were a chance for President Aquino to share the Philippines' plans to contribute to economic integration and regional growth, as well as the country's eagerness to tackle global issues, including human trafficking and pollution. The government spent ₱24 million on the trip.

On Sunday, November 9, President Aquino arrived at the Beijing Capital International Airport at around 1:20 pm CST. In Beijing, he first headed to the China National Convention Center to attend the APEC CEO Summit, where he addressed business leaders on the economic growth of the Philippines through economic reforms and innovation. He also emphasized the country's transition from being called the "Sick Man of Asia" to "Asia's Rising Tiger". He then met with Vietnamese President Trương Tấn Sang at the Philippine embassy in Beijing, where the two presidents developed an agenda for a strategic partnership that would improve economic and social ties. In the evening, the President met with Moody's Corporation CEO Raymond W. McDaniel Jr., where they discussed efforts on preventing the Ebola virus epidemic from reaching the Philippines and rehabilitation efforts on Typhoon Haiyan (Yolanda). The President also met with executives from Sanofi and Johnson & Johnson.

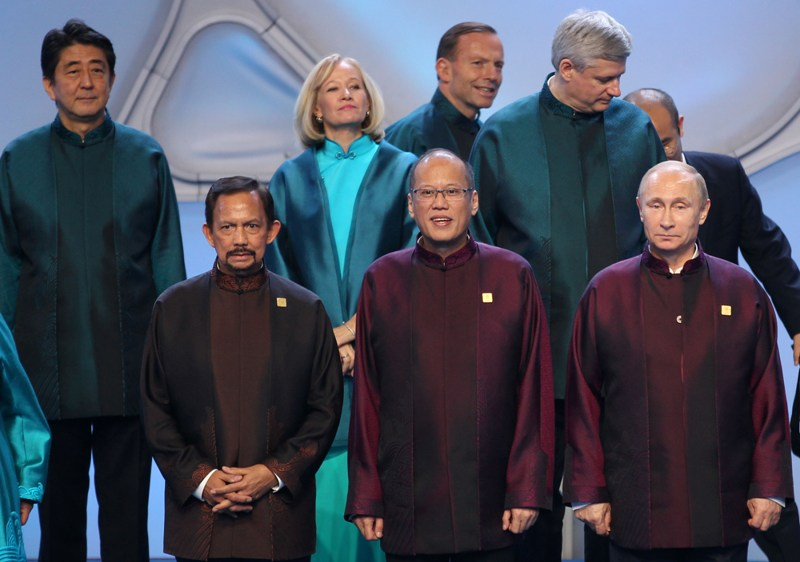
President Aquino participates in the APEC Leaders' family photo at the APEC Leaders' Meeting in Beijing on November 10, 2014.

On Monday, November 10, President Aquino returned to the Philippine embassy in Beijing to hold a series of bilateral meetings with Canadian Prime Minister Stephen Harper, Thai Prime Minister Prayut Chan-o-cha, New Zealand Prime Minister John Key, and Papuan Prime Minister Peter O'Neill. With Prime Minister Harper, the two heads of government discussed rehabilitation efforts on Typhoon Haiyan (Yolanda) and the Philippines' status in Canada's Global Markets Action Plan. With Prime Minister Prayut, the two heads of government discussed strengthening economic ties between the Philippines and Thailand, particularly on supporting small and medium-sized enterprises and local farmers. With Prime Minister Key, the two heads of government discussed rehabilitation efforts on Typhoon Haiyan (Yolanda) and the expansion of air routes between New Zealand and the Philippines. The President also thanked the Prime Minister for New Zealand's support for the peace process with Bangsamoro. With Prime Minister O'Neill, the two heads of government discussed the enhancement of cooperation between Papua New Guinea and the Philippines on trade, investment, health services, and agriculture. In the afternoon, President Aquino attended the APEC Business Advisory Council. In the evening, the President joined the other APEC leaders in attending the APEC Economic Leaders' Meeting Welcome Dinner at the Beijing National Aquatics Center, hosted by Chinese President Xi Jinping and First Lady Peng Liyuan. For the occasion, the President and the other APEC leaders wore a modified version of the Mao suit, as part of the APEC tradition of the leaders wearing the host nation's traditional outfit.

On the morning of Tuesday, November 11, President Aquino and the other APEC leaders participated in the APEC Economic Leaders' Meeting Retreat at the International Conference Center in Yanqi Lake, where he was given the chance to share the Philippines' views on advancing economic integration to promote economic growth, infrastructure development, and innovation, among others. After, the APEC leaders participated in a tree planting ceremony at the Summer Garden, outside the International Conference Center. After the ceremony, President Aquino met briefly with President Xi for a ten-minute discussion regarding the territorial disputes in the South China Sea, in which both presidents agreed to resolve the disputes in "constructive ways". In the afternoon, President Aquino and the other APEC leaders participated in the second session of the meeting, before attending a working lunch. In the evening, President Aquino departed Beijing and arrived at the Naypyidaw International Airport in Myanmar at around 11:05 pm MST.

On Wednesday, November 12, President Aquino first attended the opening ceremony of the 25th ASEAN Summit, before attending the plenary session at around 10:15 am MST, where the President was given the chance to share his views on political security and sociocultural development in the region. During the session, President Aquino also urged the finalization of a code of conduct to resolve the territorial disputes in the South China Sea. In the afternoon, President Aquino and the other ASEAN leaders participated in a series of summits with the leaders of neighboring nations to further enhance cooperation between ASEAN and the said neighboring nations, beginning with the 12th ASEAN–India Summit with Prime Minister Narendra Modi, followed by the 17th ASEAN–Japan Summit with Prime Minister Shinzō Abe, and concluding with the 40th ASEAN–Australia Commemorative Summit with Prime Minister Tony Abbott. In between, the ASEAN leaders also attended the 6th ASEAN–United Nations Summit with Secretary-General Ban Ki-moon, where the Secretary-General urged ASEAN leaders to renew their commitment to addressing issues regarding peace and security. In the evening, the ASEAN leaders attended a gala dinner hosted by President Thein Sein and First Lady Khin Khin Win.

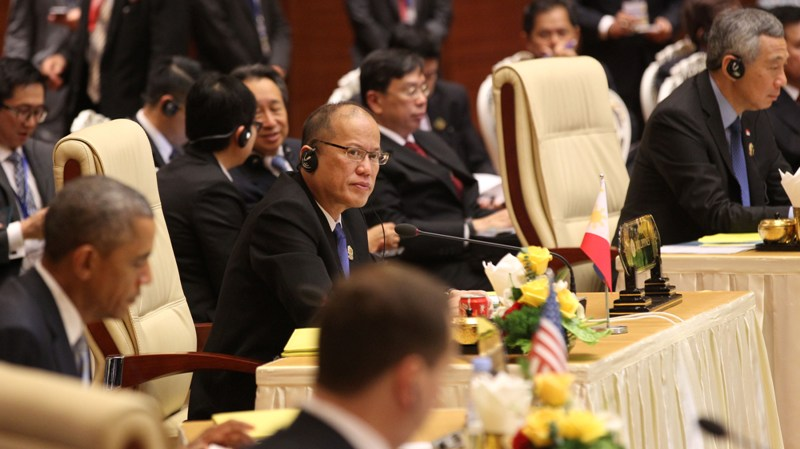
President Aquino participates in the plenary session of the Ninth East Asia Summit in Naypyidaw on November 13, 2014.

On Thursday, November 13, President Aquino attended the Ninth East Asia Summit Plenary Session, where the President was given the chance to share his views on issues regarding peace and stability, climate change, and the spread of pandemic diseases, as well as ways to further enhance Asia-Pacific economic integration. President Aquino and the other ASEAN leaders later participated in the 2nd ASEAN–United States Summit with President Barack Obama, aimed at enhancing cooperation between ASEAN and the United States to maintain regional peace and stability. After, the ASEAN leaders participated in the 17th ASEAN–China Summit with Premier Li Keqiang, where discussions focused on reinforcing ASEAN–China relations despite the ongoing territorial disputes in the South China Sea between China and a number of ASEAN nations. President Aquino then met with Indian Prime Minister Modi, where the two presidents discussed mutual interests on the ASEAN–India Free Trade Agreement and the information technology and business process management sectors, as well as India's support over a peaceful resolution on the South China Sea territorial disputes. Later that afternoon, the ASEAN leaders joined Chinese Premier Li, Japanese Prime Minister Abe, and South Korean President Park Geun-hye at the 17th ASEAN Plus Three Summit to discuss enhancing the cooperation between ASEAN and China, Japan, and South Korea. The ASEAN leaders also attended ASEAN Leaders' Meeting with ASEAN Business Advisory Council, an opportunity for ASEAN nations to be given feedback from the council and guidance to achieve economic integration. In the evening, the ASEAN leaders attended the closing ceremony of the 25th ASEAN Summit. President Aquino then headed to the Naypyidaw International Airport, where he was greeted by Overseas Filipinos in Myanmar before departing for Manila. He departed Naypyidaw at around 8:30 pm MST.

Singapore (November 18 to 19, 2014)

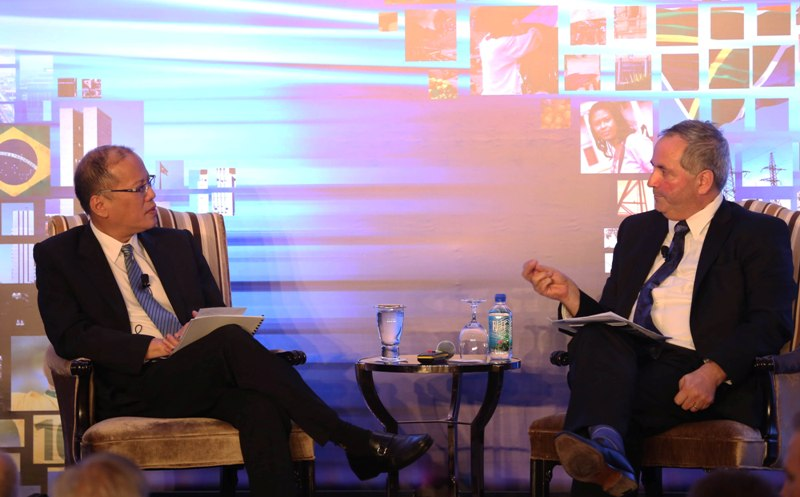
The Economist Executive Editor Daniel Franklin interviewing President Aquino at The Economist's "The World in 2015" Gala Dinner in Singapore on November 18, 2015.

President Aquino travelled to Singapore for a two-day working visit that cost ₱11.6 million. He arrived at Changi Airport at 11:28 am SST. After arriving, President Aquino headed to the Istana to meet with Prime Minister Lee Hsien Loong and President Tony Tan Keng Yam, the latter of whom hosted a luncheon for President Aquino. In the evening, President Aquino attended The Economist's "The World in 2015" Gala Dinner as a keynote speaker. During his interview with executive editor Daniel Franklin regarding his predictions for the following year, the President discussed his domestic and foreign policies, his recent meeting with General Secretary of the Chinese Communist Party Xi Jinping, the Philippines' interest in joining the Trans-Pacific Partnership, and the Philippine government's efforts in re-establishing damaged areas caused by Super Typhoon Haiyan (Yolanda). The following day, President Aquino met with business executives at a roundtable discussion organized by the Philippine Trade and Investment Center and the Singapore Business Federation, where he urged executives to invest in the Philippines, citing a 6.3 percent growth in GDP from 2010 to 2014 as a form of conviction. He also met with executives from the SIA Engineering Company, Temasek Holdings, Keppel Corporation, and GIC Private Limited. In the afternoon, the President dined at a Jollibee branch at Lucky Plaza, where he was met by a crowd of Filipinos, before departing Singapore for Manila at around 3:10 pm SST.

South Korea (December 11 to 12, 2014)

President Aquino travelled to South Korea to attend the two-day 25th ASEAN–Republic of Korea Commemorative Summit in Busan. He initially cancelled the trip in order to assist his country from the effects of Typhoon Hagupit (Ruby), but later decided to push through with the trip after being satisfied with the government's efforts and would instead monitor the situation from Busan. President Aquino arrived at Gimhae Air Base at around 1:40 pm KST. On the sidelines of the summit, the President met with President Park Geun-hye. According to Presidential Communications Operations Office Secretary Sonny Coloma, who accompanied him during the trip, President Aquino announced his intention to form a "comprehensive strategic partnership" that would further boost Philippines–South Korea relations during their bilateral meeting. The two presidents also discussed issues regarding regional security, education, and the safety of South Koreans in the Philippines. President Aquino also held a bilateral meeting with Malaysian Prime Minister Najib Razak. After, the President joined President Park and the other nine ASEAN leaders in viewing a traditional Korean arts and crafts exhibit at the Busan Exhibition and Convention Center, before attending a dinner and cultural performance hosted by President Park.

The following day, at around 9:30 am KST, President Aquino attended the first Commemorative Summit session chaired by South Korea, which focused on the multilateral cooperation between the ASEAN countries and South Korea. At around 10:50 am KST, the president attended the second Commemorative Summit session chaired by, which focused on security cooperation, climate change, and emergency management. After the summit, President Aquino and the other ASEAN leaders attended a luncheon hosted by President Park. Before departing for Manila, President Aquino inspected one of the 12 KAI T-50 Golden Eagle aircraft that the Philippines had purchased from the Korea Aerospace Industries at the tarmac of Gimhae Air Base. The president departed Gimhae Air Base at around 5:20 pm KST.

=== 2015 ===
In 2015, President Aquino made 8 official visits.

Malaysia (April 26 to 28, 2015)

President Aquino attended the 26th ASEAN Summit in Kuala Lumpur and Langkawi.

United States and Canada (May 6 to 9, 2015)

In April 2015, Deputy Presidential Spokeswoman Abigail Valte announced that President Aquino would embark on a three-day state visit to Canada from May 7 to 9, 2015, accepting the invitation from Governor General David Johnston, along with a brief working visit to Chicago in the United States beforehand and a state visit to Japan in June.

On Wednesday, May 6, President Aquino arrived at the Chicago O'Hare International Airport at approximately 1:14 pm CT to begin his four-day North American trip. He then headed to the JW Marriott Chicago, where he was met by Mayor Rahm Emanuel, who presented him with a Chicago City Council Resolution. After, the President headed to the TransUnion headquarters to attend a round table discussion with representatives from the U.S. Chamber of Commerce, the US-ASEAN Business Council, and the National Center for APEC. During the discussion, several executives of United States firms expressed interest in investing in the Philippines, praising the country's economic growth and development and the "competence and talent" of Filipino workers. In the evening, President Aquino met with the Filipino community in Chicago at the JW Marriott Chicago, where he also addressed an economic update on the Philippines, citing a 6.3 percent increase in GDP, a 479 percent increase in foreign investment from 2010 to 2014, and the country's ranking improvements in the World Bank Group's Ease of doing business index and the World Economic Forum's Global Competitiveness Report, among others.

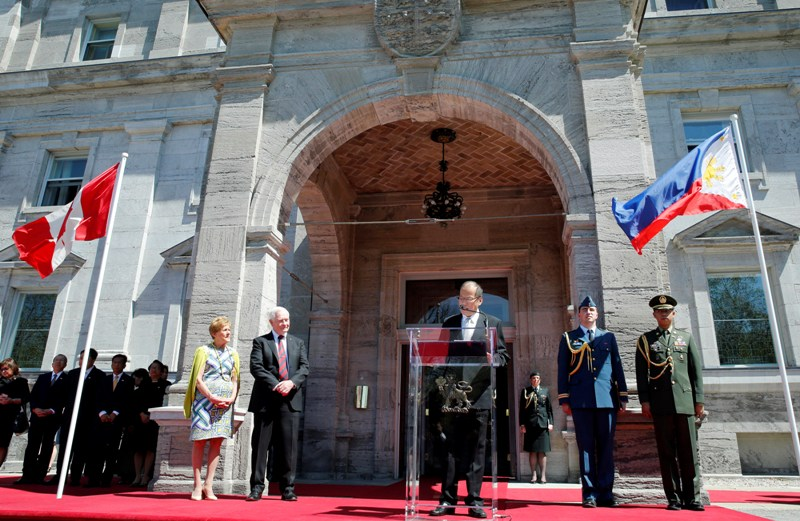
President Aquino delivers remarks during the welcome ceremony hosted by Governor General Johnston at the Rideau Hall in Ottawa on May 7, 2015.

On Thursday, May 7, President Aquino departed Chicago in the morning and arrived at Macdonald–Cartier International Airport in Ottawa at approximately 12:10 pm EDT, beginning his four-day state visit to Canada. After his arrival, the President arrived at an official welcome ceremony with military honors on a landau driven by the Royal Canadian Mounted Police at Rideau Hall, where he was met by Governor General Johnston and his wife Sharon. After the ceremony, President Aquino paid a courtesy call to Governor General Johnston inside Rideau Hall. During their meeting, Governor General Johnston praised President Aquino for his administration's efforts in contributing to the Philippines' economic growth, to which the President cited good governance, the Pantawid Pamilyang Pilipino Program, and backlog-clearing programs, while the President thanked Governor General Johnston for Canada's efforts in aiding the victims of Typhoon Haiyan (Yolanda) and their advocation for the Bangsamoro peace process. After the meeting, President Aquino participated in a ceremonial planting of a red spruce outside Rideau Hall, which is adjacent to the red maple planted by his mother, former President Corazon Aquino, during her visit in 1989. In the evening, the Johnstons hosted a state dinner for President Aquino.

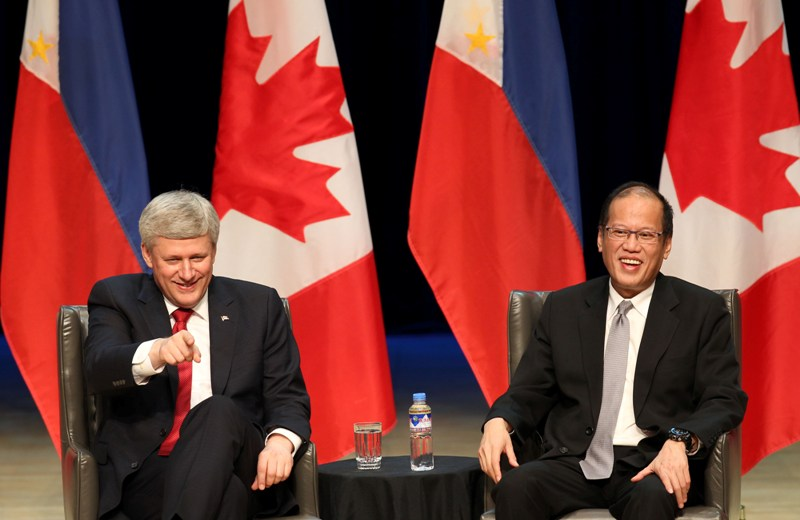
President Aquino and Prime Minister Harper attend a reception with the Filipino community in Toronto on May 8, 2015.

On Friday, May 8, President Aquino met with Prime Minister Stephen Harper at the Centre Block of Parliament Hill. At their bilateral meeting, the two heads of government discussed the regional developments on the territorial disputes in the South China Sea, the safety of the Overseas Filipino Workers in Canada, and trade between Canada and the Philippines. President Aquino and Prime Minister Harper witnessed the signing of several bilateral agreements on labor, trade, and development, before attending a joint press conference, followed by a tour of the Library of Parliament. Prime Minister Harper hosted a working luncheon for President Aquino, before the latter headed to Macdonald–Cartier International Airport to depart for Toronto. President Aquino arrived at Toronto Pearson International Airport at 2:28 pm EDT and headed to the Fairmont Royal York to attend a round table business meeting with the Asia Pacific Foundation of Canada, where opportunities for trade and investment between Canadian and Filipino businesses were discussed. Prime Minister Harper, who had travelled to Toronto, hosted a reception at Roy Thomson Hall for President Aquino to meet with over 2,000 members of the Filipino community in Canada. During his remarks, President Aquino addressed to the Filipino community a progress report on the economic growth of the Philippines, stating a 6.3 percent increase in GDP and 1.04 million jobs filled in 2014. With these statistics, he also added that the Philippines had transformed from "the sick man of Asia" to "the darling of Asia." In the evening, the President headed back to the Fairmont Royal York to meet with Justin Trudeau, leader of the Liberal Party, and Ontario Premier Kathleen Wynne. He also held a coffee meeting with the Filipino media.

On Saturday, May 9, President Aquino departed Toronto for Vancouver, the final stop of his three-day state visit to Canada, as well as his four-day visit to North America. The President and his delegation arrived at Vancouver International Airport past noon, where he was welcomed by Minister of National Defence and Multiculturalism and Citizenship Jason Kenney and British Columbia Attorney General Suzanne Anton. After arriving, President Aquino headed to the Pan Pacific Vancouver Hotel to meet with British Columbia Premier Christy Clark, where they also witnessed the signing of a memorandum of understanding between Philippine Labor and Employment Secretary Rosalinda Baldoz and British Columbia International Trade Minister Teresa Wat, aimed at strengthening the employment abilities of Filipinos in British Columbia, as well as their protection. President Aquino also met with executives of the Aquilini Investment Group who had invested in renewable energy in the Philippines, particularly Cebu. During their meeting, the Aquilini Investment Group also expressed interest in investing in the tourism and the agricultural sectors of the Philippines. Finally, the President met with the Filipino community at the Vancouver Convention Centre. In the evening, President Aquino and his delegation departed Vancouver International Airport for Manila.

Japan (June 2 to 5, 2015)

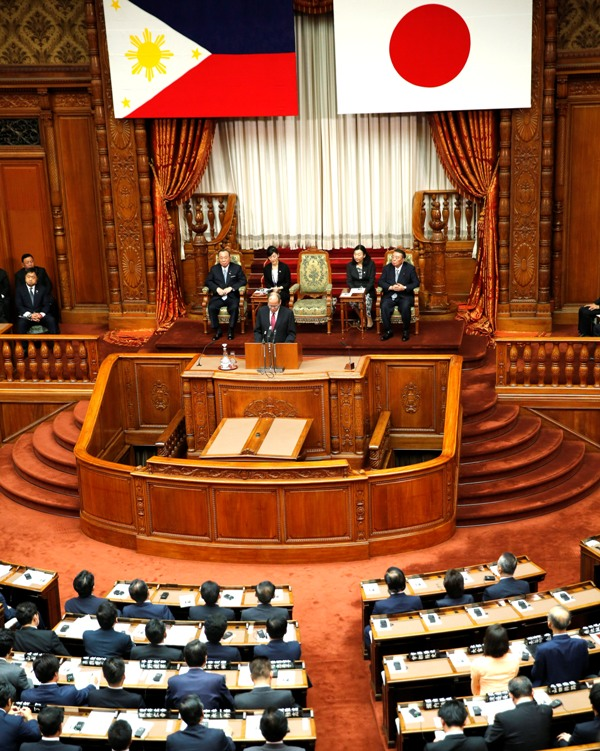
President Aquino addresses a joint session of the National Diet in Tokyo on June 3, 2015.

President Aquino travelled to Tokyo for a four-day state visit from June 2 to 5, 2015, aimed at promoting business deals with Japanese investors and seeking support from Japan to resolve the territorial disputes in the South China Sea.

On Tuesday, June 2, President Aquino arrived at Haneda Airport. After arriving, he headed to the Imperial Hotel to meet with Japanese businessmen, before meeting with the Filipino community at Hotel Okura.

On Wednesday, June 3, President Aquino was received by Emperor Akihito and Empress Michiko at the Imperial Palace. During their meeting, President Aquino was awarded the Grand Cordon of the Order of the Chrysanthemum by Emperor Akihito, who in return was awarded the Grand Collar (Supremo) of the Order of Lakandula by President Aquino for bolstering the Japan–Philippines relations. President Aquino also attended the 21st International Conference on The Future of Asia organized by Nikkei 225 at Hotel Okura, where he delivered a keynote speech. During his keynote speech, President Aquino urged China to reconsider their land reclamation activities in the South China Sea, as it breaches the conditions of the 2002 ASEAN–China Declaration on the Conduct of Parties, comparing China's actions to Nazi Germany's territorial expansion before World War II. Later that afternoon, President Aquino addressed a joint session of the National Diet, seeking Japan's assistance to resolve the territorial disputes. In the evening, Emperor Akihito and Empress Michiko hosted a state dinner for President Aquino at the Imperial Palace.

On Thursday, June 4, President Aquino attended the Philippine Investment Forum at the Hotel New Otani, attended by over 1,000 Japanese businessmen, urging them to invest in information technology, infrastructure, and manufacturing in the Philippines. He then headed to the Akasaka Palace to meet with Prime Minister Shinzō Abe for a bilateral meeting, followed by a joint press conference and an official dinner in the evening. The two heads of government discussed the enhancement of the strategic partnership between Japan and the Philippines, as well as developments over the territorial disputes in the South China Sea. President Aquino also thanked Prime Minister Abe for Japan's efforts in aiding the victims of Typhoon Haiyan (Yolanda) and their support towards the Bangsamoro peace process. They then witnessed the signing of the Memorandum of Cooperation for Healthcare, signed by the Philippine Department of Health and the Japanese Ministry of Health, Labour, and Welfare to further enhance universal health care.

On Friday, June 5, President Aquino held a joint press conference with the Japan National Press Club, where he announced his intentions for a Visiting Forces Agreement with Japan in order for Japanese troops to assist in defense over the territorial disputes in the South China Sea. He was also met by Emperor Akihito and Empress Michiko at the Imperial Hotel, before heading to Haneda Airport to depart Tokyo for Manila with ₱13.5 billion investment pledges from eleven companies and ₱136.9 billion of concessional loans for infrastructure projects.

Malaysia (November 20 to 22, 2015)

President Aquino attended the 27th ASEAN Summit and the Tenth East Asia Summit in Kuala Lumpur, his last before stepping down from office. During the ASEAN Summit, President Aquino and the other ASEAN leaders announced the creation of the ASEAN Economic Community, an economic integration between ASEAN member states to begin on December 31, 2015. After the summit, the ASEAN leaders signed the ASEAN Convention on Trafficking in Persons (ACTIP) to address the issue of human trafficking, especially within women and children.

France, Italy and Vatican City (November 29 to December 4, 2015)

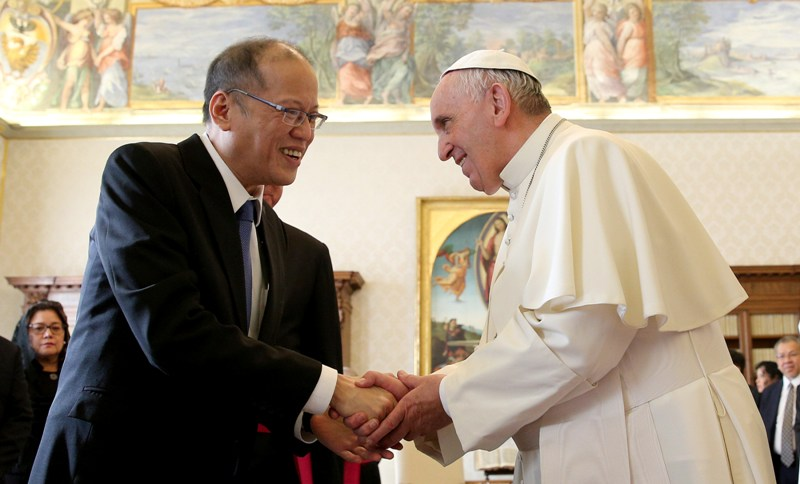
President Aquino meeting with Pope Francis for the former's papal audience at Vatican City, December 4, 2015

During an interview at the APEC CEO Summit on November 16, President Aquino announced his participation in the 2015 United Nations Climate Change Conference in Paris, amidst the aftermath of the recent Paris attacks. On November 26, Department of Foreign Affairs Assistant Secretary Maria Cleofe Natividad announced that President Aquino would also undertake a working visit to Rome, where he would meet with Italian President Sergio Mattarella and Italian Prime Minister Matteo Renzi and have an audience with Pope Francis in Vatican City to reciprocate the pope's visit to the Philippines the previous January. At the Climate Change Conference in Paris, President Aquino delivered a three-minute speech "that highlights Philippine response to the impact of climate change and campaign for the inclusion of human rights, the vulnerability of indigenous peoples and gender issues in the Paris agreement."

President Aquino arrived at the Paris–Le Bourget Airport on Sunday, November 29, at around 6:15 pm CET.

=== 2016 ===
In 2016, President Aquino made his last official visit.

United States (February 15 to 17, 2016)

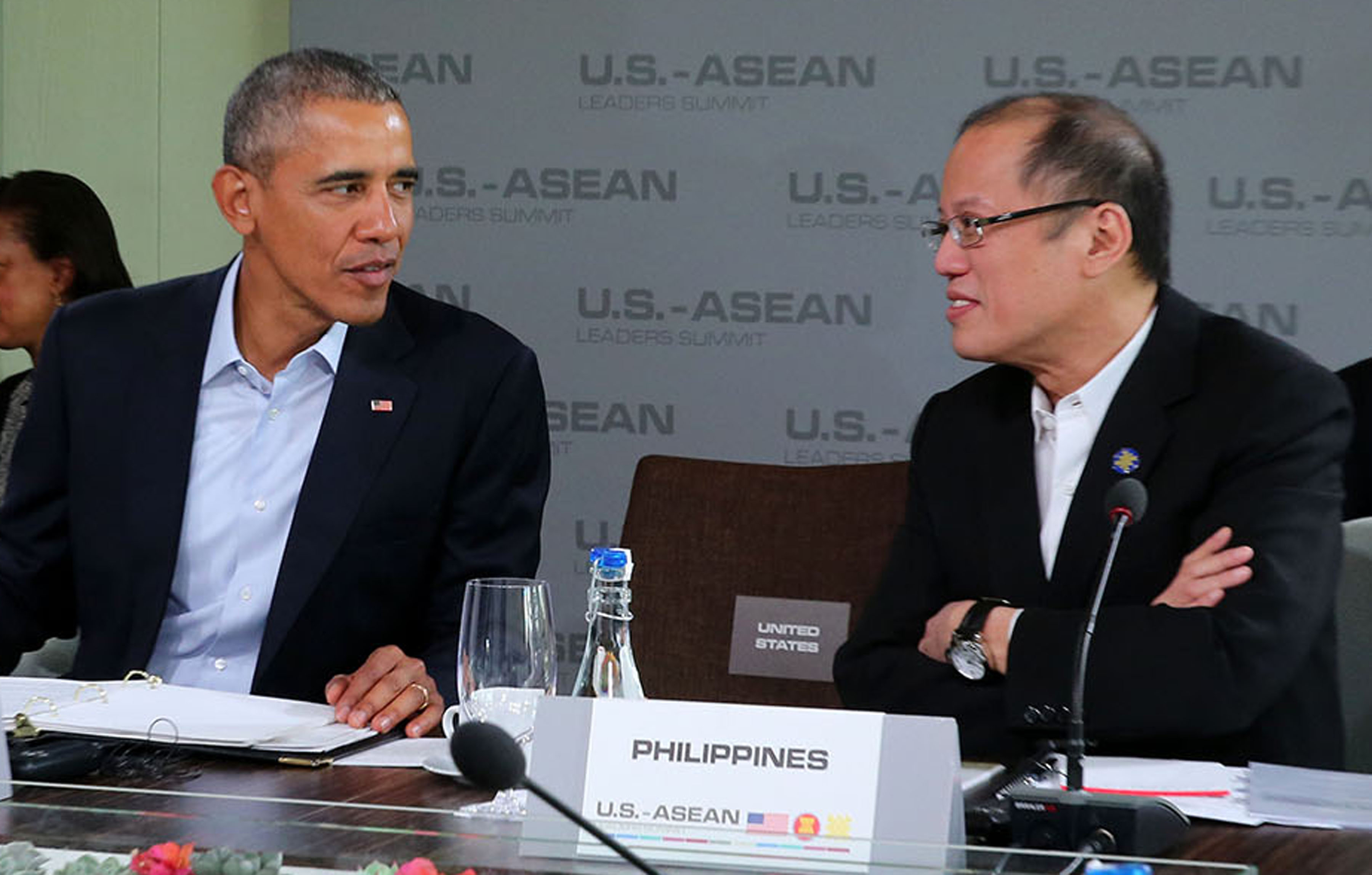
President Aquino conversing with U.S. President Barack Obama during the U.S.-ASEAN Summit in Rancho Mirage, California, February 17, 2016

President Aquino attended the special United States-ASEAN Summit hosted by U.S. President Barack Obama from February 15 to 16 at the Sunnylands estate in Rancho Mirage, California, joining the other leaders of the Association of Southeast Asian Nations (ASEAN). According to a statement released by the White House, the summit aims to strengthen cooperation on "political, security and economic issues" between the United States and the ASEAN member states under the United States-ASEAN strategic partnership signed in November 2015. Aquino is also expected to raise the issue on the territorial disputes in the South China Sea which the Philippines is a claimant along with Brunei, Malaysia, and Vietnam. On February 16, after participating in the summit, Aquino visited Los Angeles to address the Los Angeles World Affairs Council, which according to the council is regarding the "new defense agreement between Manila and Washington, security in East Asia, and the future for economic growth in the Philippines and its neighbors in Southeast Asia," at the InterContinental hotel in Century City. On February 17, President Aquino received an honorary Doctor of Humane Letters degree from the Loyola Marymount University "in recognition of his dedication to his country, his integrity, and his embodiment of a Jesuit education." He also met with Los Angeles-based investors and the Filipino-American community in Los Angeles, before departing for Manila.

== Multilateral meetings ==
Group	Year						
Group	2010	2011	2012	2013	2014	2015	2016
APEC	November 13–14, (Japan) Yokohama	November 12–13, (United States) Honolulu	September 9–10, (Russia) Vladivostok	October 5–7, (Indonesia) Denpasar	November 10–11, (China) Beijing	November 18–19, (Philippines) Pasay	
ASEAN	October 28–31, (Vietnam) Hanoi	May 7–8, (Indonesia) Jakarta	April 3–4, November 18–20, (Cambodia) Phnom Penh	April 24–25, October 9–10, (Brunei) Bandar Seri Begawan	May 10–11, November 12–13, (Myanmar) Naypyidaw	April 26–27, (Malaysia) Kuala Lumpur and Langkawi	
ASEAN	October 28–31, (Vietnam) Hanoi	November 17–19, (Indonesia) Bali	April 3–4, November 18–20, (Cambodia) Phnom Penh	April 24–25, October 9–10, (Brunei) Bandar Seri Begawan	May 10–11, November 12–13, (Myanmar) Naypyidaw	November 20–22, (Malaysia) Kuala Lumpur	
EAS	October 30, (Vietnam) Hanoi	November 18–19, (Indonesia) Nusa Dua	November 19–20, (Cambodia) Phnom Penh	October 9–10, (Brunei) Bandar Seri Begawan	November 12–13, (Myanmar) Naypyidaw	November 21–22, (Malaysia) Kuala Lumpur	
Others	UN General Assembly; September 24, (United States) New York City	none	Asia–Europe Meeting; November 5–6, (Laos) Vientiane	World Economic Forum; January 24–27, (Switzerland) Davos	Climate Summit; September 23, (United States) New York City	UN Climate Change Summit; November 30, (France) Paris	United States-ASEAN Summit; February 15–16, Rancho Mirage
Others	UN General Assembly; September 24, (United States) New York City	none	Asia–Europe Meeting; November 5–6, (Laos) Vientiane	World Economic Forum on East Asia; June 7–8, (Myanmar) Naypyidaw	Bali Democracy Forum; October 10, (Indonesia) Nusa Dua	UN Climate Change Summit; November 30, (France) Paris	United States-ASEAN Summit; February 15–16, Rancho Mirage
Others	UN General Assembly; September 24, (United States) New York City	none	Asia–Europe Meeting; November 5–6, (Laos) Vientiane	ASEAN–Japan Commemorative Summit; December 12–14, Tokyo	ASEAN–Republic of Korea Commemorative Summit; December 11–12, (South Korea) Busan	UN Climate Change Summit; November 30, (France) Paris	United States-ASEAN Summit; February 15–16, Rancho Mirage
██ = Hosted by the Philippines; ██ = Future event

== See also ==
- Foreign relations of the Philippines
- List of international presidential trips made by Gloria Macapagal Arroyo, his predecessor
- List of international presidential trips made by Rodrigo Duterte, his successor
