= List of international presidential trips made by Gloria Macapagal Arroyo =

President of the Philippines, 2001–2010

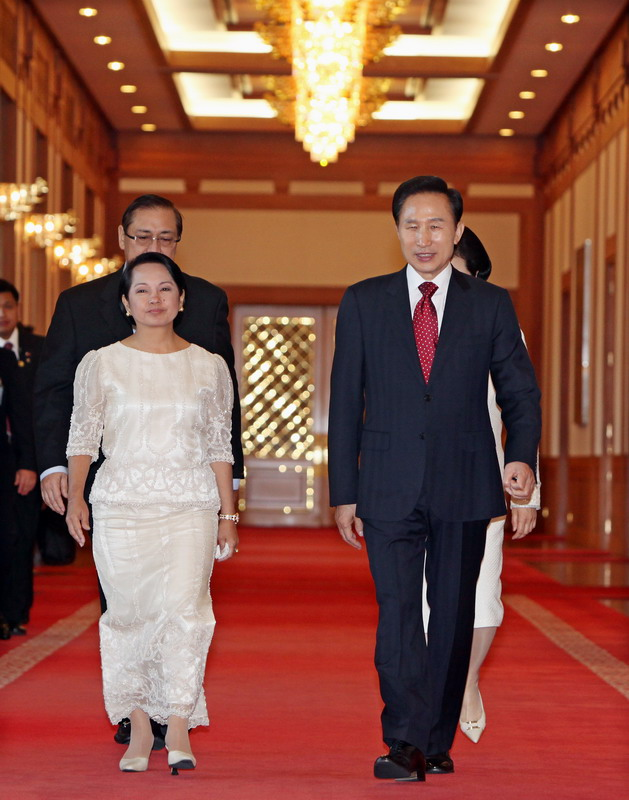
Arroyo with South Korean President Lee Myung-bak during her visit to South Korea in May 2009.

This is a list of foreign presidential trips made by Gloria Macapagal Arroyo, the 14th president of the Philippines from 2001 to 2010. During her ten-year presidency, Arroyo has visited a total of 44 countries. With a total of 127 foreign trips, Arroyo has made the most foreign trips by a Philippine president in office.

== Summary of international trips ==
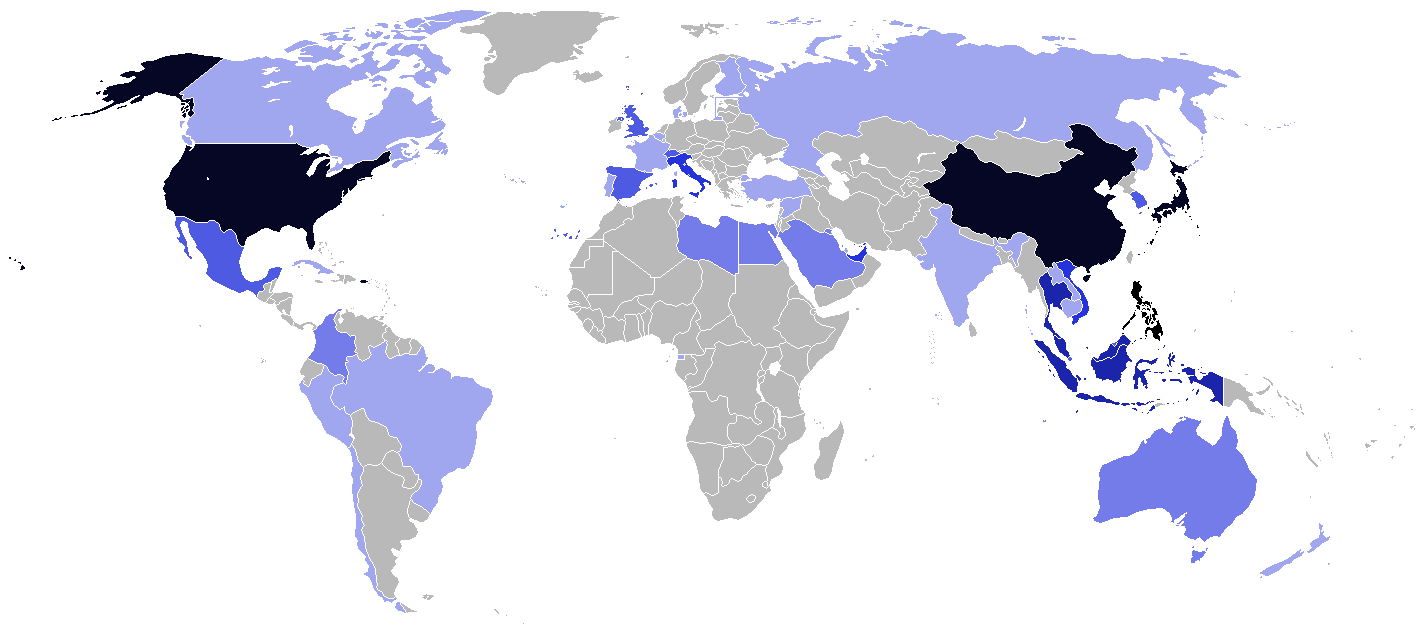
Map of international trips made by Gloria Macapagal-Arroyo as president: 1 visit 2 visits 3 visits 4 visits 5 visits 6 visits 7 or more visits Philippines

Number of visits	Country
1 visit	Belgium, Brazil, Cambodia, Canada, Chile, Cuba, Denmark, Equatorial Guinea, Finland, France, India, Laos, New Zealand, Peru, Portugal, Qatar, Russia, Syria, Turkey
2 visits	Australia, Bahrain, Colombia, Egypt, Libya, Saudi Arabia
3 visits	Brunei, Kuwait, Mexico, Singapore, South Korea, Spain, Switzerland, United Kingdom
4 visits	Italy, United Arab Emirates, Vatican City, Vietnam
5 visits	Indonesia, Malaysia, Thailand
7 visits	Japan
15 visits	China(Hong Kong)
16 visits	United States

== List of international trips ==
Date(s)		Note	Places visited	Country	Details
August 7–9	2001	State visit		Malaysia	Met with Malaysian Prime Minister Mahathir Mohamad
August 22–24	2001	State visit		Brunei	Met with Malaysian Prime Minister Mahathir Mohamad
August 24–26	2001	State visit	Singapore		Met with Malaysian Prime Minister Mahathir Mohamad
September 12–15	2001	Working visit		Japan	Summit meeting with Prime Minister Junichiro Koizumi and attended the 23rd Joint Conference of the Japan-Philippines Economic Cooperation Committee and the Global Business Dialogue on Electronic Commerce
October 19–22	2001	Visit	Shanghai	China	Attended the APEC Economic Leaders' Meeting
October 28–29	2001	Official visit	Hong Kong		
October 29–31	2001	State visit		China	
November 4–6	2001	Visit	Bandar Seri Begawan	Brunei	Attended the ASEAN Summit
November 12–13	2001	State visit		Indonesia	
November 15–20	2002	Working visit		United States	Met with President George W. Bush
November 21	2002		Visit	Mexico	Attended the Christian Democrats summit meeting
January 28–29	2002	Official visit	London	United Kingdom	Met with Prime Minister Tony Blair
January 29	2002	Working visit		Canada	Met with Prime Minister Jean Chrétien
February	2002	Working visit	New York City	United States	Addressed the World Economic Forum and met with President of Israel Shimon Peres
May 7	2002	Official visit	Kuala Lumpur	Malaysia	Addressed the 35th International General Meeting of Pacific Basin Economic Council
May 7–8	2002	Official visit		Thailand	
May 20–24	2002	Working visit		Japan	
October 24–25 and 27–30	2002	Working visits		United States	
October 25–27	2002	Visit	Los Cabos	Mexico	Attended the APEC Economic Leaders' Meeting
November 3–6	2002	Visit	Phnom Penh	Cambodia	Attended the ASEAN Summit
November 6–7	2002	State visit		Vietnam	
December 2–5	2002	State visit		Japan	
February 2–3	2003	Official visit		Kuwait	
February 23–25	2003	Visit	Kuala Lumpur	Malaysia	Attended the Non-Aligned Movement Summit
April 4	2003	Visit		Thailand	Attended the Special ASEAN-China Leaders Meeting on SARS
May 17–23	2003	State and working visit	Los Angeles	United States	Met with President George W. Bush and First Lady Laura Bush
June 2–4	2003	State visit		South Korea	Met with President Roh Moo-hyun
June 4–6	2003	Working visit		Japan	Met with Prime Minister Junichiro Koizumi
September 1–3	2003	Visit		Brunei	Attended the PECC XV
September 24–26	2003	Visit		United States	Addressed the 58th United Nations General Assembly
September 27–28	2003	Working visit		Holy See	Met with Pope John Paul II
September 29	2003	Visit		France	Attended a UNESCO summit
October 6–8	2003	Visit	Bali	Indonesia	Attended the 9th ASEAN Summit
October 15–16	2003	Visit	Putrajaya	Malaysia	Attended the 10th Organisation of Islamic Cooperation Summit Conference
October 19–21	2003	Visit	Bangkok	Thailand	Attended the 15th APEC Economic Leaders' Meeting
December 10–12	2003	Visit	Tokyo	Japan	Attended the ASEAN–Japan Commemorative Summit
December 14–15	2003	State visit		Bahrain	
September 1–3	2004	State visit		China	Met with President Hu Jintao Premier Wen Jiabao and Chairman Jiang Zemin of the Central Military Commission
September 8–9	2004	Official visit		Brunei	Attended the wedding of Crown prince Al-Muhtadee Billah and Pengiran Anak Sarah
October 7–9	2004	Visit	Hanoi	Vietnam	Attended the 5th Asia-Europe Meeting
November 17–18 and 23	2004	Working visit		United States	
November 19–22	2004	Visit	Santiago	Chile	Attended the 16th APEC Economic Leaders' Meeting
November 22–23	2004	Official visit	Mexico City	Mexico	Met with President Vicente Fox and First Lady Marta Sahagún
November 28–30	2004	Visit	Vientiane	Laos	Attended the 10th ASEAN Summit
January 5–6	2005	Visit		Indonesia	Attended the Special ASEAN Leaders' Summit on the 2004 Indian Ocean earthquake and tsunami
April 6–9	2005	Official visit	Holy See		Attended the funeral of Pope John Paul II
April 21–22	2005	Visit	Jakarta	Indonesia	Attended the Asia-Africa Summit and Commemoration of the Golden Jubilee
August	2005	Working visit		Singapore	
September 12–16	2005	Visit		United States	Addressed the United Nations General Assembly
November 17–19	2005	Visit	Busan	South Korea	Attended the 10th APEC Economic Leaders' Meeting
December 11–14	2005	Visit	Kuala Lumpur	Malaysia	Attended the 11th ASEAN Summit meeting with BIMP-EAGA and the First East Asia Summit
May 7–10	2006	State visit		Saudi Arabia	Met with King Abdullah
June 24–25	2006	Official visit	Holy See		Met with Pope Benedict XVI
June 29–30	2006	Official visit	Madrid	Spain	Met with King Juan Carlos I
July 15	2006	Official visit	Bandar Seri Begawan	Brunei	Attended the 60th birthday of Sultan Hassanal Bolkiah
July 16–18	2006	State visit	Tripoli	Libya	
September 9–11	2006	Visit	Helsinki	Finland	Attended the 6th Asia-Europe Meeting
September 12–13	2006	Official visit	Brussels	Belgium	
September 13–14	2006	Official visit	London	United Kingdom'	
September 15	2006	Official visit	Havana	Cuba	Met with President Fidel Castro and attended the 14th Non-Aligned Movement Summit
September 16–17	2006	Official visit	Honolulu	United States	
October 27 - November 1	2006	Visit	Nanning and Hong Kong	China	Attended the China Commemorative Summit in Nanning and met with ZTE officials in Hong Kong
November 17–19	2006	Visit	Hanoi	Vietnam	Attended the 18th APEC Economic Leaders' Meeting
November 19–20	2006	Working visit	Singapore		
January 25–26	2007	Visit	Davos	Switzerland	Attended the World Economic Forum
January 27	2007	State visit		Kuwait	
April 19–21	2007	Visit	Bo'ao	China	Attended the Boao Forum for Asia
May 22–25	2007	Visit	Tokyo	Japan	Attended the 13th International Conference on the Future of Asia
May 27–30	2007	State visit		New Zealand	
May 30–31	2007	State visit	Canberra and Melbourne	Australia	
June 2–4	2007	Private visit	Rome	Holy See	Met with Pope Benedict XVI and attended the canonization of Marie-Eugénie de Jésus
June	2007	Private visit	Lisbon	Holy See	Met with President Aníbal Cavaco Silva
June 6–7	2007	State visit	Sichuan and Chongqing	China	
June 25–26	2007	State visit		Singapore	Met with President S. R. Nathan
June 26–27	2007	State visit		Equatorial Guinea	Met with President Teodoro Obiang Nguema Mbasogo
August 30–31	2007	Official visit		Malaysia	Attended the 50th anniversary of Malaysian Independence
September 7–9	2007	Visit	Sydney	Australia	Attended the 19th APEC Economic Leaders' Meeting
September 26–29	2007	Visit		United States	Addressed the 16th United Nations General Assembly
October 2–3	2007	Working visit	Shanghai	China	Attended the 2007 Special Olympics World Summer Games
October 4–6	2007	State visit		India	
November 18–22	2007	Visit	Singapore		Attended the 13th ASEAN Summit
December 2–8	2007	State visit		Spain	
December 9–10	2007	Working visit		Kuwait	
January 22–25	2008	Working visit	Zürich and Davos	Switzerland	Attended the World Economic Forum
January 26–28	2008	Official visit		United Arab Emirates	
March 30 - April 1	2008	Working visit	Hong Kong	China	Addressed a keynote at the 11th Asian Investment Conference
June 21–28	2008	Official/working visit		United States	
August 7–9	2008	Official visit	Beijing	China	Met with President Hu Jintao and attended the opening ceremony of the 2008 Summer Olympics
September 21–27	2008	Visit	New York City	United States	Addressed the 63rd United Nations General Assembly
October 23–27	2008	Working visit	Beijing	China	Attended the 7th Asia-Europe Meeting
November 10–13	2008	Working visit	New York City	United States	Addressed the United Nations General Assembly
November 13–16	2008	State visit	Doha	Qatar	
November	2008	Working visit		United Arab Emirates	
November 21–23	2008	Visit	Lima	Peru	Attended the 20th APEC Economic Leaders' Meeting
November	2008	Official visit		Colombia	Met with President Álvaro Uribe
November 27	2008	Working visit		United States	
January 30–31	2009	Visit	Davos	Switzerland	Attended the World Economic Forum
February 1–2	2009	Working visit	Milan	Italy	
February 3–4	2009	Working visit		Saudi Arabia	
February 4–5	2009	Official visit		Bahrain	Met with Prime Minister Khalifa bin Salman Al Khalifa
February 6–7	2009	Official visit		United States	Attended a prayer conference
February 28 - March 1	2009	Visit	Pattaya	Thailand	Attended the 14th ASEAN Summit
April 10–11	2009	Visit	Pattaya	Thailand	Attended the reconvened 14th ASEAN Summit
April 12–14	2009	Working visit	Dubai	United Arab Emirates	United Arab Emirates
May 2–3	2009	Official/working visit	Cairo	Egypt	Met with President Hosni Mubarak
May 4–6	2009	State visit	Damascus	Syria	Met with President Bashar al-Assad and addressed the People's Council of Syria
May 11–15	2009	Visit	Manado	Indonesia	Attended the Coral Triangle Initiative Summit
May 30 - June 2	2009	Visit	Jeju	South Korea	Attended the Republic of Korea Commemorative Summit
June 3–5	2009	Visit	St. Petersburg	Russia	Attended the XII St. Petersburg International Economic Forum and met with President Dmitry Medvedev
June 17–20	2009	Working visit	Tokyo	Japan	Met with Emperor Akihito and Empress Michiko and Prime Minister Tarō Asō
June 22–25	2009	State visit	Brasília Recife, Rio de Janeiro	Brazil	Met with President Luiz Inácio Lula da Silva President José Sarney of the Federal Senate and President Michel Temer of the Chamber of Deputies
July 15–16	2009	Visit	Sharm el-Sheikh	Egypt	Attended the 15th Non-Aligned Movement Summit
July 30–31	2009	Official visit	Washington, D.C.	United States	Met with President Barack Obama
August 28 - September 1	2009	Official visit	Tripoli	Libya	Attended the African Union Summit and ceremonies for the 40th anniversary of the 1969 Libyan coup d'état; met with Prime Minister Muammar Gaddafi President Mahinda Rajapaksa of Sri Lanka, and Prime Minister Yousaf Raza Gillani of Pakistan
September 16–17	2009	Working visit	Ankara	Turkey	Met with President Abdullah Gül
September 17–20	2009	Visit		United Kingdom	Delivered a keynote address at The Economist's "The Emerging Markets Summit" event
September 21–23	2009	Official visit	Jeddah	Saudi Arabia	Attended the inauguration of the King Abdullah University of Science and Technology in Thuwal
November 13–15	2009	Visit	Singapore		Attended the 21st APEC Economic Leaders' Meeting
November 17–18	2009	Visit	Pattaya	Thailand	Attended the 15th ASEAN Summit
December 16–19	2009	Visit	Copenhagen	Denmark	Attended the 2009 United Nations Climate Change Conference
April 8–9	2010	Visit	Hanoi	Vietnam	Attended the 16th ASEAN Summit
April 12–13	2010	Visit	Washington, D.C.	United States	Attended the Nuclear Security Summit
April 14–15	2010	Official visit	Madrid	Spain	Awarded the Don Quixote de la Mancha Award by King Juan Carlos I of Spain
June 8–9	2010	Visit	Shanghai	China	Visited the Expo 2010

== See also ==
- Foreign relations of the Philippines
- List of international presidential trips made by Benigno Aquino III, her successor
