= Asian Forest Cooperation Organization =

Intergovernmental organization

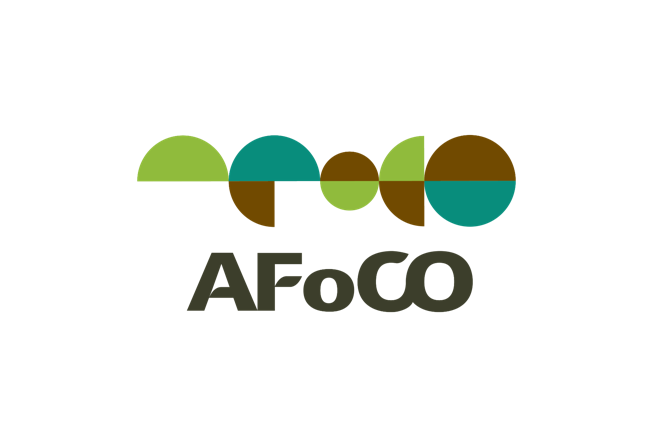
- Flag

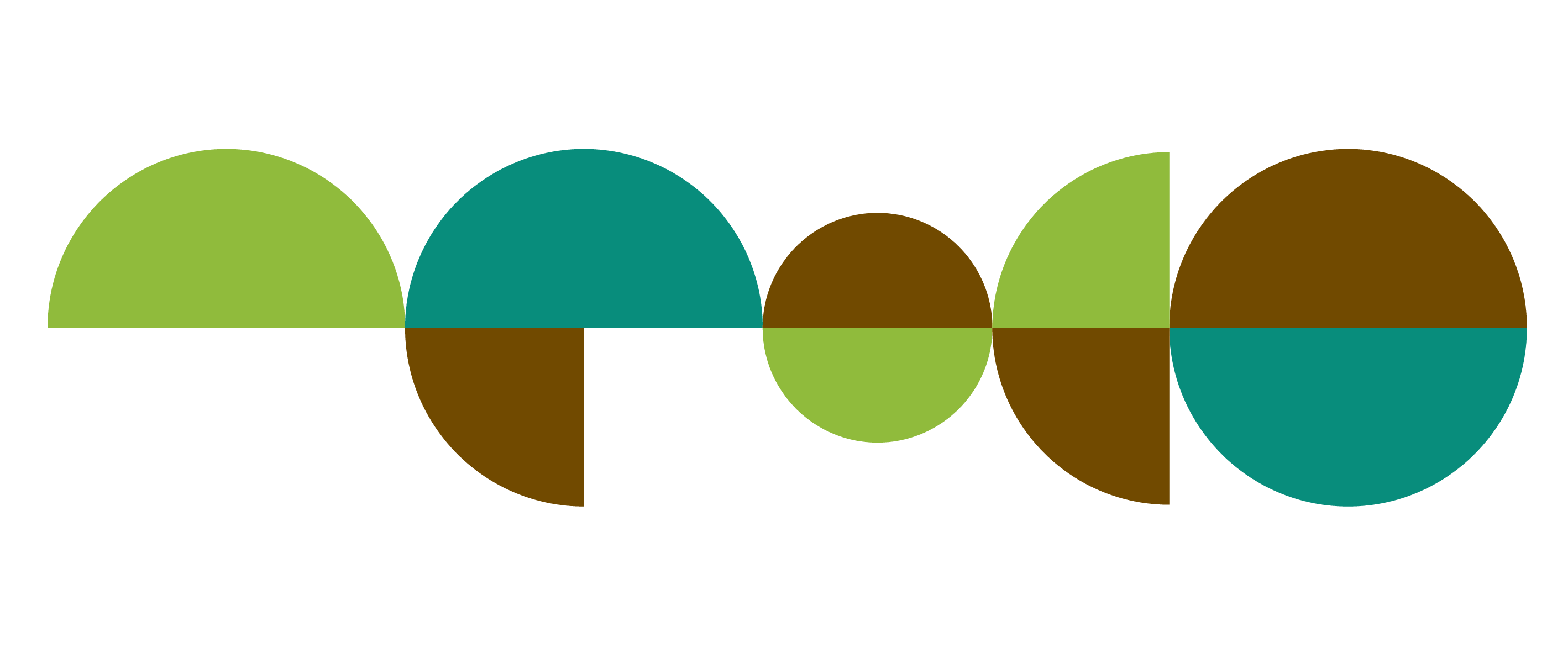
- Emblem
- Abbreviation: AFoCO
- Formation: 27 April 2018 (8 years ago)
- Type: Intergovernmental organization
- Headquarters: Seoul, Republic of Korea
- Members: 15 Parties: Bhutan; Brunei Darussalam; Cambodia; Indonesia; Kazakhstan; Kyrgyzstan; Laos; Mongolia; Myanmar; Philippines; South Korea; Tajikistan; Thailand; Timor Leste; Vietnam; 2 Observer: Malaysia; Singapore; (2024)
- Official language: English
- Executive Director: Park Chongho
- Website: www.afocosec.org

Asian Forest Cooperation Organization (or AFoCO) is an intergovernmental organization in Asia aiming to strengthen forest cooperation by transforming proven technology and policies into concrete actions in the context of sustainable forest management to address the impact of climate change.

== History ==
=== Background ===
The establishment of AFoCO was proposed by the Republic of Korea at the ASEAN–Republic of Korea Commemorative Summit in 2009 in Jeju, Republic of Korea. The establishment of AFoCO was welcomed by all ASEAN leaders.

=== ASEAN-ROK Forest Cooperation ===
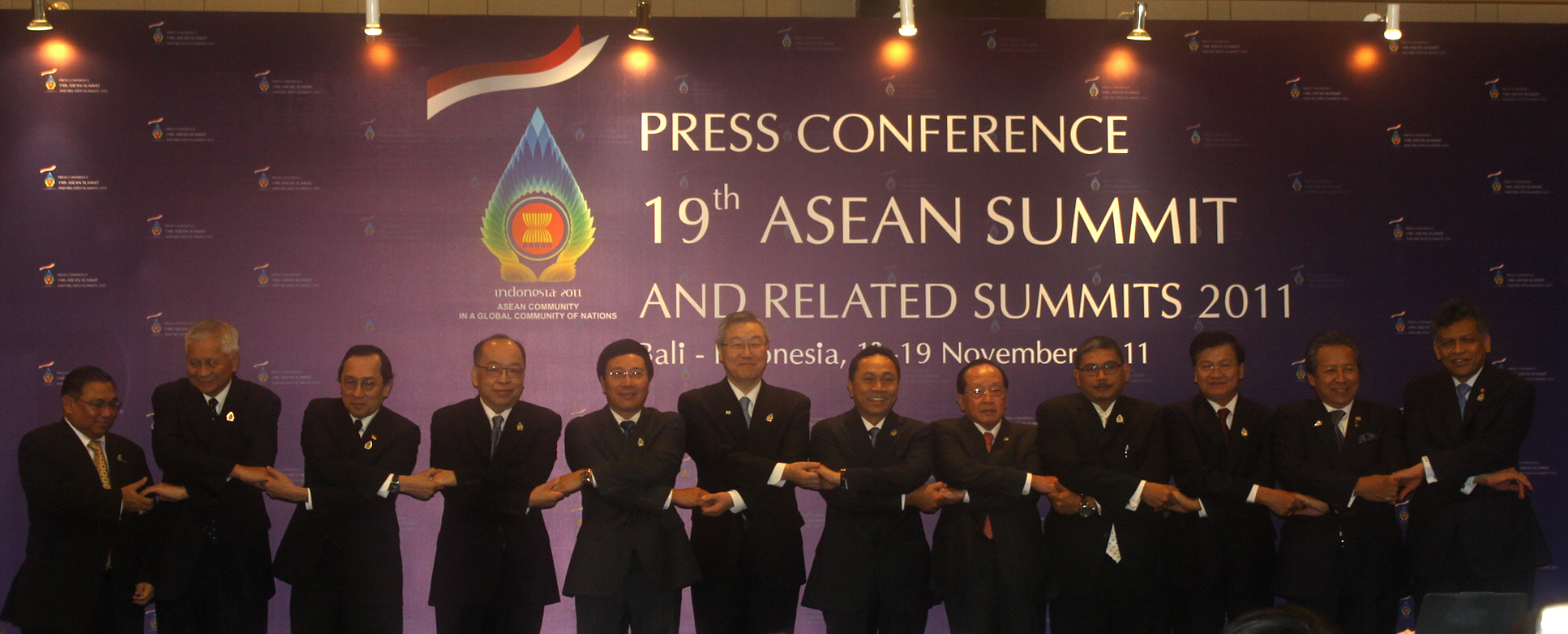
Signing of the Agreement on ASEAN-ROK on Forest Cooperation

As the initial phase of AFoCO, a cooperation mechanism of ASEAN-ROK Forest Cooperation was formalized by the "Agreement between the Governments of the Member States of the Association of Southeast Asian Nations and Republic of Korea on Forest Cooperation" which was signed at the occasion of the 14th ASEAN-ROK Summit on 18 November 2011 in Bali, Indonesia and entered into force on 5 August 2012.

=== Dialogue for the Establishment of AFoCO ===
A new dialogue for the establishment of AFoCO under a multilateral platform was formed with invitations to Bhutan, Kazakhstan, Mongolia, and Timor Leste. This platform covered a wide range of geographical diversity, stretching from coastal islands to glaciated mountains to central Asia deserts. The Agreement on the Establishment of AFoCO (Agreement) was negotiated through six successive dialogues among ASEAN member states, ROK, and prospective members from 2013 to 2015. The Agreement was adopted on 22 September 2015 and entered into force on 27 April 2018.

== Objectives ==
AFoCO aims to strengthen forest cooperation by transforming proven technology and policies into concrete actions in the context of sustainable forest management to address the impact of climate change.

== Parties ==
As of October 2024, 15 countries have deposited respective instruments and are officially registered as parties to AFoCO, in alphabetical order, Bhutan, Brunei Darussalam, Cambodia, Indonesia, Kazakhstan, Kyrgyzstan, Laos, Mongolia, Myanmar, Philippines, Republic of Korea, Tajikistan, Thailand, Timor Leste, and Vietnam. Malaysia and Singapore are participating as Observers.

== Institutional Arrangements ==
The institutional arrangement is stipulated in the Agreement on the Establishment of the Asian Forest Cooperation Organization.

- Assembly, represented by a senior official on forestry from each party, is the decision making body of the AFoCO.
- Secretariat based in Seoul assists the Assembly in the implementation, coordination, monitoring and reporting of activities under AFoCO.

== Vision and Mission ==
AFoCO envisions “A Greener Asia with climate-resilient and sustainable forests, landscapes and communities,” the achievement of which is supported by our mission to “Promote action-oriented international cooperation for creating enabling policies, building capacities, and fostering inclusive multi-level partnerships to drive Asian forests onto a climate-resilient and sustainable path.”

== AFoCO Secretariat ==
The Secretariat of AFoCO administers and coordinates the activities and day-to-day operations of the organization as mandated by the Assembly. The Secretariat is located in Seoul, Republic of Korea. The Secretariat is headed by the Executive Director, in which the position is defined in the Agreement as the chief administrative officer of the organization who is appointed by the Assembly.

Executive Directors of the Asian Forest Cooperation Organization
No.	Name	Country of origin	Took office - Left office
0	Hadi Pasaribu	Indonesia	January 2013 - August 2016 (ASEAN-Korea Forest Cooperation)
1	Chencho Norbu	Bhutan	1 January 2019 - 31 December 2020
2	Ricardo L. Calderon	Philippines	1 January 2021 - 31 December 2022
3	Park Chongho	South Korea	1 January 2023 (Incumbent)

== See also ==
- List of forestry ministries
