= ASEAN–Republic of Korea Commemorative Summit =

Biannual Association of Southeast Asian Nations meeting

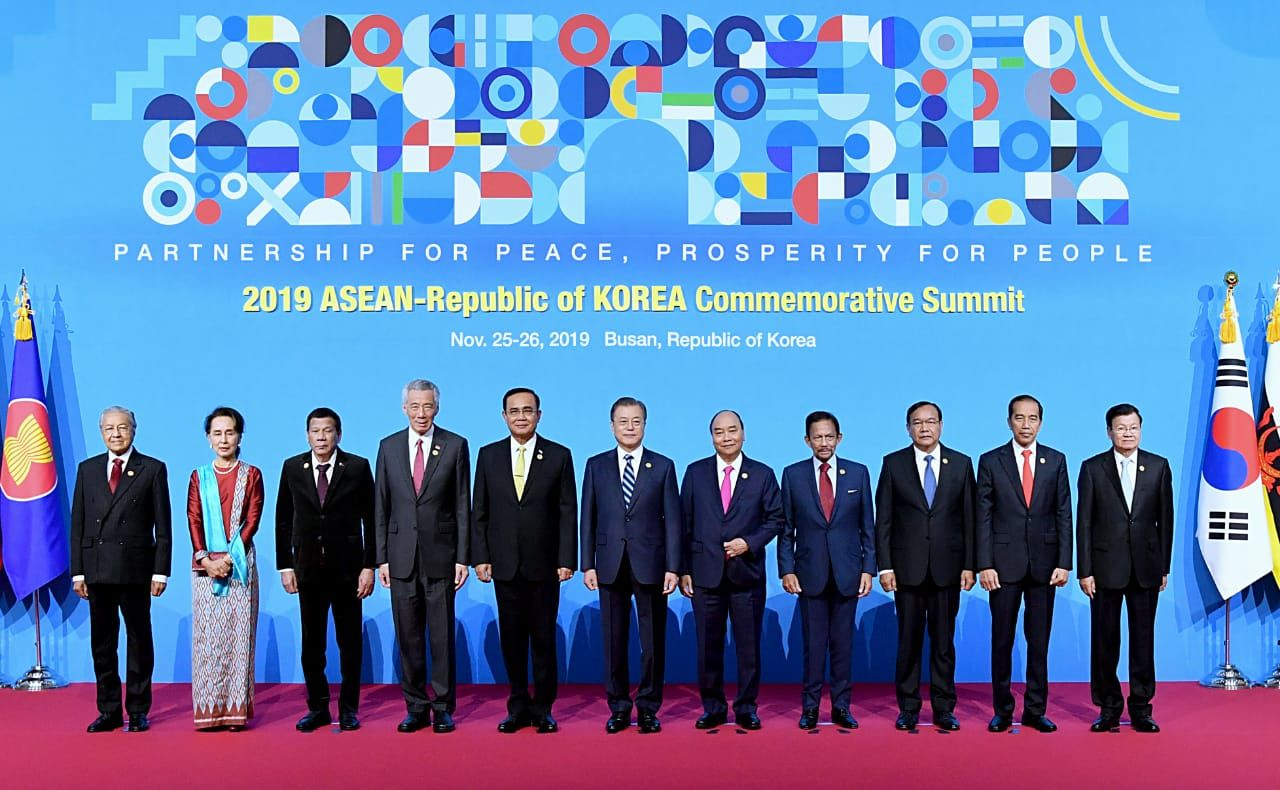
Leaders pictured at the ASEAN–Republic of Korea Commemorative Summit Welcoming Dinner held at the Hilton Hotel, Busan, on Monday, 25 November 2019.

The ASEAN Summit is a biannual meeting held by the members of the Association of Southeast Asian Nations (ASEAN) in relation to economic, political, security, and socio-cultural development of Southeast Asian countries. The league of ASEAN is currently connected with other countries who aim to participate on the missions and visions of the league.

== 2019 ASEAN-ROK Commemorative Summit ==
=== 1. Overview ===
2019 ASEAN-ROK Commemorative Summit will be held in Busan from 25 to 26 November to celebrate the 30th anniversary of the ASEAN-ROK Dialogue Partnership, which was established in 1989. Also, the 1st Mekong-ROK Summit will be held on 27 November back to back with the 2019 ASEAN-ROK Commemorative Summit.

There will be over 10 thousands participants, including nations and entrepreneurs of ROK and ASEAN Countries, in the Summit and side events. Thus, this summit will be the biggest summit held in ROK since the inauguration of the Moon administration.

The summit is the epitome of New Southern policy by promoting the cooperation with ASEAN in all areas based on the common and shared values of 3Ps(People, Prosperity and Peace)

=== 2. Backgrounds and Significance ===
ROK will be the first country to host the commemorative summit in its territory more than 3 times.

Therefore, the summit itself shows the robust trust and support of ASEAN towards the ROK's concrete vision of bolstering partnership with ASEAN.

Also, the first Mekong-ROK summit is meaningful because the Mekong-ROK cooperation was elevated from the ministerial level to the summit level in this year.

- Mekong countries: Cambodia, Laos, Myanmar, Vietnam, Thailand.

=== 3. Major events ===
A series of side events will take place before and during the period of summit.

Especially, the "ASEAN Train" event in which 200 ASEAN and Korean citizens will hop on a train to tour some of Korea's beautiful spots including Busan, Gwangju and the Demilitarized Zone and the ASEAN Pop music concert will be organized before the summit, which can widely promote the special bond between ASEAN and Korea.

Also, the ASEAN-ROK business and start-up expo, smart city fair, exhibition on Governance innovation will be held during the summit, which can encourage the sustainable ASEAN-ROK cooperation.

=== 4. Participating countries ===
Brunei, Cambodia, Indonesia, Laos, Malaysia, Myanmar, Philippines, Singapore, Thailand, Vietnam

== ASEAN-Republic of Korea Commemorative Summit 2009 ==
ASEAN–Republic of Korea Commemorative Summit 2009
ASEAN – Republic of Korea Commemorative Summit 2009
- Brunei Darussalam Sultan Hassanal Bolkiah Cambodia Prime Minister Hun Sen Indonesia President Susilo Bambang Yudhoyono South Korea President Lee Myung Bak Laos Prime Minister Bouasone Bouphavanh Malaysia Prime Minister Najib Tun Razak Myanmar Prime Minister Thein Sein Philippines President Gloria Macapagal Arroyo Singapore Prime Minister Lee Hsien Loong Thailand Prime Minister Abhisit Vejjajiva Vietnam Prime Minister Nguyễn Tấn Dũng

The ASEAN – Republic of Korea Commemorative Summit is an international meeting which Republic of Korea held to celebrate the 20th anniversary of the ASEAN – Republic of Korea dialogue relations. The summit was held from 1 to 2 June 2009 in Jeju Island, Republic of Korea. The Heads of Government/State of each ASEAN member country, the President of Korea, and the Secretary General of ASEAN attended the summit.

The ASEAN – Korea CEO Summit, ASEAN – Korea Traditional Music Orchestra, and Green Growth Exhibition were held as special events at the International Convention Center Jeju (ICC Jeju) from 31 May to 2 June.

Other culture and tourism events were held in different parts of Jeju Island throughout the duration of the summit.

=== 1. Background ===
The ASEAN–Republic of Korea Commemorative Summit was held as 2009 marks the 20th anniversary of the ASEAN-Republic of Korea Dialogue Relationship. The Leaders of the 11 countries discussed the developments of cooperative relations between Korea and the countries in the ASEAN region for the past 20 years, and also examined future directions for progress. Methods to overcome global issues that the international society faces, such as the 2008 financial crisis and climate change, were also discussed.

The summit was another move for Korea to put the "New Asia Diplomacy Plan" into action, strengthen Korea's collaborative relations with the Southeast Asian region and expand Korea's diplomatic relations.

=== 2. Overview ===
==== Program at a Glance ====
31 May (Sun)
- CEO Summit: Opening Ceremony & Sessions 1, 2
- ASEAN-Korea Traditional Music Orchestra Performance
1 June (Mon)
- CEO Summit: Sessions 3, 4 & Closing Ceremony
- Commemorative Summit Session 1
- Welcoming Dinner & Cultural Performance
2 June (Tue)
- Green Asia, Green Growth Exhibition
- Commemorative Summit Session 2
- Leaders' Luncheon
- Joint Press Conference

==== Participants ====
Participants for the Summit are:

- HOS/Gs of all ASEAN countries and Republic of Korea (See the information box for a detail)
- The Secretary General of ASEAN
- Ministers
- Official Media
- Embassy Staffs
- Other Delegates
- CEOs (to participate in ASEAN-Korea CEO Summit)

The total number of participants is expected to be over 7,000.

==== Logo/Catchphrase ====
The logo symbolizes the core message of the Summit, namely, "neighborhood filled with warmth" and "partnership for common prosperity", through the image of eleven people holding hands, and embodies a desire to further promote the relationship.

The rainbow gradation represents the uniqueness of each country bound together in harmony, and suggests a bright future for ASEAN-Republic of Korea relations.

The catchphrase "Partnership for Real, Friendship for Good" symbolizes the policies of the ASEAN, which pursue tighter relations between Republic of Korea and ASEAN countries, and aim to share closer friendship through more frequent cultural and individual exchanges.

==== Venue ====
The main venue of the Summit was the International Convention Center Jeju (ICC Jeju) located at Jungmun, Seogwipo, Jeju. It features a resort-style convention center and often used for international conventions, banquets, sport events, etc. Major events of the Summit were held at ICC Jeju.

=== 3. Commemorative Summit Sessions ===
There were two Commemorative Summit sessions, session 1 on 1 June and session 2 on 2 June. Each session involved HOS/Gs of all ASEAN countries, the president of Republic of Korea and the Secretary General of ASEAN.

Each session had different agendas to cover. Session 1 covers agendas such as "Evaluation of cooperative relationship between Korea and ASEAN" and "Direction of developments in politics, national security, economy, society and culture". Session 2 covered ways to strengthen the cooperative strategy of worldwide issues such as the 2008 financial crisis, energy security, and climate change.

Leaders of Korea and the ten ASEAN member countries signed a joint statement composed of 40 clauses in five sections at the end of the summit. The joint statement well reflected the leaders' commitment to contribute to the global efforts to address climate change welcoming ROK's proposal to establish an Asian Forest Cooperation Organisation.

=== 4. Special events ===
==== ASEAN-Korea CEO Summit ====
In conjunction with the ASEAN-Korea Commemorative Summit 2009, the ASEAN-Korea Summit 2009 took place from 31 May – 1 June 2009, with Asian government and business leaders attending. Hosted by KCCI, this forum was held under the theme of "Change, Challenge, and Collaboration for Asia’s Prosperity," which was expected to provide participants from Korea and ASEAN countries with a platform to find international countermeasures to address the 2008 financial crisis and promote regional business cooperation.

==== ASEAN-Korea Traditional Music Orchestra ====
Composed of a total of 52 kinds of traditional musical instruments and musicians from Korea and the 10 ASEAN member countries in South-eastern Asia, the ASEAN-Korea Traditional Music Orchestra held its first performance on 31 May to celebrate the holding of a special ASEAN–Republic of Korea Commemorative Summit.

==== Green Growth Exhibition ====
Green Growth Exhibition was held at the lobby of the International Convention Center (ICC) under the theme of "Green Growth, Green Asia". The exhibit highlighted the technologies of core next-generation growth engines for a low-carbon, green growth industry. Six theme sections display 27 items of real-size and scaled-down models of state-of-the-art technologies for solar energy, water treatment, a green (fuel cell-powered) car, wind power generation and a smart grid.
